= List of districts of Vietnam =

Until July 2025, the provinces of Vietnam were subdivided into second-level administrative units, namely districts (Vietnamese: huyện), provincial cities (thành phố trực thuộc tỉnh), and district-level towns (thị xã). The centrally-controlled municipalities (the other first-level division, in addition to provinces) were subdivided into rural districts (huyện), district-level towns, and urban districts (quận) that are further subdivided into wards (phường). The district (huyện) unit dated from the 15th century.

This article lists all second-level administrative units as of when they were abolished, grouped by the province that they belonged to at that time. Cities, municipal cities and towns are italicised, urban districts are underlined while capital cities are bolded and italicised.

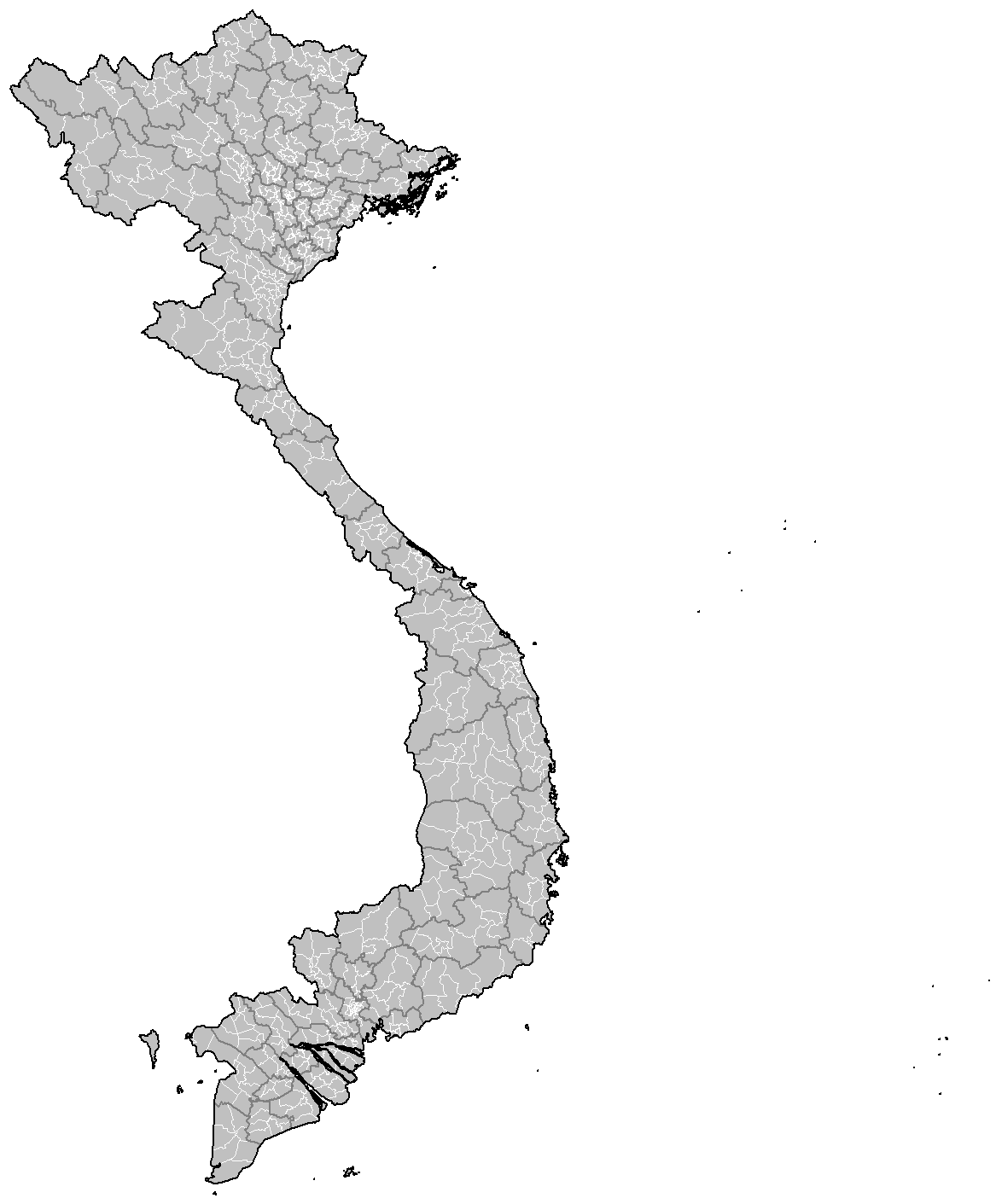
Districts of Vietnam

== Current province ==
=== An Giang province ===
Name	Capital	Status
An Phú	An Phú	District
Châu Đốc		City
Châu Phú	Cái Dầu	District
Châu Thành	An Châu	District
Chợ Mới	Chợ Mới	District
**Long Xuyên**		City
Phú Tân	Phú Mỹ	District
Tân Châu		Town
Thoại Sơn	Núi Sập	District
Tịnh Biên	Tịnh Biên	District
Tri Tôn	Tri Tôn	District

=== Bắc Ninh province ===
Name	Capital	Status
**Bắc Ninh**		City
Gia Bình	Gia Bình	District
Lương Tài	Thứa	District
Quế Võ		Town
Thuận Thành		Town
Tiên Du	Lim	District
Từ Sơn		City
Yên Phong	Chờ	District

=== Cà Mau province ===
Name	Capital	Status
**Cà Mau**		City
Cái Nước	Cái Nước	District
Đầm Dơi	Đầm Dơi	District
Năm Căn	Năm Căn	District
Ngọc Hiển	Viên An Đông	District
Phú Tân	Cái Đôi Vàm	District
Thới Bình	Thới Bình	District
Trần Văn Thời	Trần Văn Thời	District
U Minh	U Minh	District

=== Cần Thơ ===
Name	Capital	Status
Bình Thủy		Urban District
Cái Răng		Urban District
Cờ Đỏ	Cờ Đỏ	District
**Ninh Kiều**		Urban District
Ô Môn		Urban District
Phong Điền	Phong Điền	District
Thới Lai	Thới Lai	District
Thốt Nốt		Urban District
Vĩnh Thạnh	Vĩnh Thạnh	District

=== Cao Bằng province ===
Name	Capital	Status
Bảo Lạc	Bảo Lạc	District
Bảo Lâm	Pác Miầu	District
**Cao Bằng**		City
Hạ Lang	Thanh Nhật	District
Hà Quảng	Xuân Hòa	District
Hòa An	Nước Hai	District
Nguyên Bình	Nguyên Bình	District
Quảng Hòa	Quảng Uyên	District
Thạch An	Đông Khê	District
Thông Nông	Thông Nông	District
Trà Lĩnh	Hùng Quốc	District
Trùng Khánh	Trùng Khánh	District

=== Đà Nẵng ===
Name	Capital	Status
Cẩm Lệ		Urban District
**Hải Châu**		Urban District
Hòa Vang	Hòa Phong	District
Hoàng Sa	None	District
Liên Chiểu		Urban District
Ngũ Hành Sơn		Urban District
Sơn Trà		Urban District
Thanh Khê		Urban District

=== Đắk Lắk province ===
Name	Capital	Status
Buôn Đôn	Ea Wer	District
Buôn Hồ		Town
**Buôn Ma Thuột**		City
Cư M'gar	Quảng Phú	District
Cư Kuin	Dray Bhăng	District
Ea H'leo	Ea Drăng	District
Ea Kar	Ea Kar	District
Ea Súp	Ea Súp	District
Krông Ana	Buôn Trấp	District
Krông Bông	Krông Kmar	District
Krông Buk	Chư Kbô	District
Krông Năng	Krông Năng	District
Krông Pắk	Phước An	District
Lắk	Liên Sơn	District
M'Đrăk	M'Drắk	District

=== Điện Biên province ===
Name	Capital	Status
Điện Biên	Thanh Xương	District
Điện Biên Đông	Mường Luân	District
**Điện Biên Phủ**		City
Mường Ảng	Mường Ảng	District
Mường Chà	Mường Chà	District
Mường Lay		Town
Mường Nhé	Mường Nhé	District
Nậm Pồ	Nà Hỳ	District
Tủa Chùa	Tủa Chùa	District
Tuần Giáo	Tuần Giáo	District

=== Đồng Nai province ===
Name	Capital	Status
**Biên Hòa**		City
Cẩm Mỹ	Long Giao	District
Định Quán	Định Quán	District
Long Khánh		City
Long Thành	Long Thành	District
Nhơn Trạch	Phú Hội	District
Tân Phú	Tân Phú	District
Thống Nhất	Dầu Giây	District
Trảng Bom	Trảng Bom	District
Vĩnh Cửu	Vĩnh An	District
Xuân Lộc	Gia Ray	District

=== Đồng Tháp province ===
Name	Capital	Status
**Cao Lãnh**		City
Cao Lãnh	Mỹ Thọ	District
Châu Thành	Cái Tàu Hạ	District
Hồng Ngự		City
Hồng Ngự	Thường Thới Tiền	District
Lai Vung	Lai Vung	District
Lấp Vò	Lấp Vò	District
Sa Đéc		City
Tam Nông	Tràm Chim	District
Tân Hồng	Sa Rài	District
Thanh Bình	Thanh Bình	District
Tháp Mười	Mỹ An	District

=== Gia Lai province ===
Name	Capital	Status
Ayun Pa		Town
An Khê		Town
Chư Păh	Phú Hòa	District
Chư Prông	Chư Prông	District
Chư Pưh	Nhơn Hòa	District
Chư Sê	Chư Sê	District
Đắk Đoa	Đắk Đoa	District
Đắk Pơ	Đắk Pơ	District
Đức Cơ	Chư Ty	District
Ia Grai	Ia Kha	District
Ia Pa	Kim Tân	District
K'Bang	K'Bang	District
Kông Chro	Kông Chro	District
Krông Pa	Phú Túc	District
Mang Yang	Kon Dơng	District
Phú Thiện	Phú Thiện	District
**Pleiku**		City

=== Hà Nội ===
Name	Capital	Status
Ba Đình		Urban District
Ba Vì	Tây Đằng	District
Bắc Từ Liêm		Urban District
Cầu Giấy		Urban District
Chương Mỹ	Chúc Sơn	District
Đan Phượng	Phùng	District
Đông Anh	Đông Anh	District
Đống Đa		Urban District
Gia Lâm	Trâu Quỳ	District
Hà Đông		Urban District
Hai Bà Trưng		Urban District
Hoài Đức	Trạm Trôi	District
**Hoàn Kiếm**		Urban District
Hoàng Mai		Urban District
Long Biên		Urban District
Mê Linh	Đại Thịnh	District
Mỹ Đức	Đại Nghĩa	District
Nam Từ Liêm		Urban District
Phú Xuyên	Phú Xuyên	District
Phúc Thọ	Phúc Thọ	District
Quốc Oai	Quốc Oai	District
Sóc Sơn	Sóc Sơn	District
Sơn Tây		Town
Tây Hồ		Urban District
Thạch Thất	Liên Quan	District
Thanh Oai	Kim Bài	District
Thanh Trì	Văn Điển	District
Thanh Xuân		Urban District
Thường Tín	Thường Tín	District
Ứng Hòa	Vân Đình	District

=== Hà Tĩnh province ===
Name	Capital	Status
Cẩm Xuyên	Cẩm Xuyên	District
Can Lộc	Nghèn	District
Đức Thọ	Đức Thọ	District
**Hà Tĩnh**		City
Hồng Lĩnh		Town
Hương Khê	Hương Khê	District
Hương Sơn	Phố Châu	District
Kỳ Anh		Town
Kỳ Anh	Kỳ Anh	District
Lộc Hà	Lộc Hà	District
Nghi Xuân	Tiên Điền	District
Thạch Hà	Thạch Hà	District
Vũ Quang	Vũ Quang	District

=== Hải Phòng ===
Name	Capital	Status
An Dương		Urban District
An Lão	An Lão	District
Bạch Long Vĩ	None	District
Cát Hải	Cát Bà	District
Đồ Sơn		Urban District
Dương Kinh		Urban District
Hải An		Urban District
**Hồng Bàng**		Urban District
Kiến An		Urban District
Kiến Thụy	Núi Đối	District
Lê Chân		Urban District
Ngô Quyền		Urban District
Thủy Nguyên		Municipal City
Tiên Lãng	Tiên Lãng	District
Vĩnh Bảo	Vĩnh Bảo	District

=== Ho Chi Minh City ===
Name	Capital	Status
Bình Chánh	Tân Túc	District
Bình Tân		Urban District
Bình Thạnh		Urban District
Cần Giờ	Cần Thạnh	District
Củ Chi	Củ Chi	District
**District 1**		Urban District
District 3		Urban District
District 4		Urban District
District 5		Urban District
District 6		Urban District
District 7		Urban District
District 8		Urban District
District 10		Urban District
District 11		Urban District
District 12		Urban District
Gò Vấp		Urban District
Hóc Môn	Hóc Môn	District
Nhà Bè	Nhà Bè	District
Phú Nhuận		Urban District
Tân Bình		Urban District
Tân Phú		Urban District
Thủ Đức		Municipal City

=== Huế ===
Name	Capital	Status
A Lưới	A Lưới	District
Hương Thủy		Town
Hương Trà		Town
Phong Điền		Town
Phú Lộc	Phú Lộc	District
Phú Vang	Phú Đa	District
Phú Xuân		Urban District
Quảng Điền	Sịa	District
**Thuận Hóa**		Urban District

=== Hưng Yên province ===
Name	Capital	Status
Ân Thi	Ân Thi	District
**Hưng Yên**		City
Khoái Châu	Khoái Châu	District
Kim Động	Lương Bằng	District
Mỹ Hào		Town
Phù Cừ	Trần Cao	District
Tiên Lữ	Vương	District
Văn Giang	Văn Giang	District
Văn Lâm	Như Quỳnh	District
Yên Mỹ	Tân Lập	District

=== Khánh Hòa province ===
Name	Capital	Status
Cam Lâm	Cam Đức	District
Cam Ranh		City
Diên Khánh	Diên Khánh	District
Khánh Sơn	Tô Hạp	District
Khánh Vĩnh	Khánh Vĩnh	District
**Nha Trang**		City
Ninh Hòa		Town
Trường Sa	Trường Sa	District
Vạn Ninh	Vạn Giã	District

=== Lai Châu province ===
Name	Capital	Status
**Lai Châu**		City
Mường Tè	Mường Tè	District
Nậm Nhùn	Nậm Nhùn	District
Phong Thổ	Phong Thổ	District
Sìn Hồ	Sìn Hồ	District
Tam Đường	Tam Đường	District
Tân Uyên	Tân Uyên	District
Than Uyên	Than Uyên	District

=== Lâm Đồng province ===
Name	Capital	Status
Bảo Lâm	Lộc Thắng	District
Bảo Lộc		City
Cát Tiên	Cát Tiên	District
Đạ Huoai	Ma Đa Guôi	District
**Đà Lạt**		City
Đạ Tẻh	Đạ Tẻh	District
Đam Rông	Rô Men	District
Di Linh	Di Linh	District
Đơn Dương	Thạnh Mỹ	District
Đức Trọng	Liên Nghĩa	District
Lạc Dương	Lạc Dương	District
Lâm Hà	Đinh Văn	District

=== Lạng Sơn province ===
Name	Capital	Status
Bắc Sơn	Bắc Sơn	District
Bình Gia	Bình Gia	District
Cao Lộc	Cao Lộc	District
Chi Lăng	Đồng Mỏ	District
Đình Lập	Đình Lập	District
Hữu Lũng	Hữu Lũng	District
**Lạng Sơn**		City
Lộc Bình	Lộc Bình	District
Tràng Định	Thất Khê	District
Văn Lãng	Na Sầm	District
Văn Quan	Văn Quan	District

=== Lào Cai province ===
Name	Capital	Status
Bắc Hà	Bắc Hà	District
Bảo Thắng	Phố Lu	District
Bảo Yên	Phố Ràng	District
Bát Xát	Bát Xát	District
**Lào Cai**		City
Mường Khương	Mường Khương	District
Sa Pa		Town
Si Ma Cai	Si Ma Cai	District
Văn Bàn	Khánh Yên	District

=== Nghệ An province ===
Name	Capital	Status
Anh Sơn	Kim Nhan	District
Con Cuông	Trà Lân	District
Diễn Châu	Diễn Thành	District
Đô Lương	Đô Lương	District
Hoàng Mai		Town
Hưng Nguyên	Hưng Nguyên	District
Kỳ Sơn	Mường Xén	District
Nam Đàn	Nam Đàn	District
Nghi Lộc	Quán Hành	District
Nghĩa Đàn	Nghĩa Đàn	District
Quế Phong	Kim Sơn	District
Quỳ Châu	Tân Lạc	District
Quỳ Hợp	Quỳ Hợp	District
Quỳnh Lưu	Cầu Giát	District
Tân Kỳ	Tân Kỳ	District
Thái Hòa		Town
Thanh Chương	Dùng	District
Tương Dương	Thạch Giám	District
**Vinh**		City
Yên Thành	Hoa Thành	District

=== Ninh Bình province ===
Name	Capital	Status
Gia Viễn	Thịnh Vượng	District
**Hoa Lư**		City
Kim Sơn	Phát Diệm	District
Nho Quan	Nho Quan	District
Tam Điệp		City
Yên Khánh	Yên Ninh	District
Yên Mô	Yên Thịnh	District

=== Phú Thọ province ===
Name	Capital	Status
Cẩm Khê	Cẩm Khê	District
Đoan Hùng	Đoan Hùng	District
Hạ Hòa	Hạ Hòa	District
Lâm Thao	Lâm Thao	District
Phù Ninh	Phong Châu	District
Phú Thọ		Town
Tam Nông	Hưng Hóa	District
Tân Sơn	Tân Phú	District
Thanh Ba	Thanh Ba	District
Thanh Sơn	Thanh Sơn	District
Thanh Thủy	Thanh Thủy	District
**Việt Trì**		City
Yên Lập	Yên Lập	District

=== Quảng Ngãi province ===
Name	Capital	Status
Ba Tơ	Ba Tơ	District
Bình Sơn	Châu Ổ	District
Đức Phổ		Town
Lý Sơn	None	District
Minh Long	Long Hiệp	District
Mộ Đức	Mộ Đức	District
Nghĩa Hành	Chợ Chùa	District
**Quảng Ngãi**		City
Sơn Hà	Di Lăng	District
Sơn Tây	Sơn Dung	District
Sơn Tịnh	Tịnh Hà	District
Trà Bồng	Trà Xuân	District
Tư Nghĩa	La Hà	District

=== Quảng Ninh province ===
Name	Capital	Status
Ba Chẽ	Ba Chẽ	District
Bình Liêu	Bình Liêu	District
Cẩm Phả		City
Cô Tô	Cô Tô	District
Đầm Hà	Đầm Hà	District
Đông Triều		City
**Hạ Long**		City
Hải Hà	Quảng Hà	District
Móng Cái		City
Quảng Yên		Town
Tiên Yên	Tiên Yên	District
Uông Bí		City
Vân Đồn	Cái Rồng	District

=== Quảng Trị province ===
Name	Capital	Status
Cam Lộ	Cam Lộ	District
Cồn Cỏ	None	District
Đa Krông	Krông Klang	District
**Đông Hà**		City
Gio Linh	Gio Linh	District
Hải Lăng	Diên Sanh	District
Hướng Hóa	Khe Sanh	District
Quảng Trị		Town
Triệu Phong	Ái Tử	District
Vĩnh Linh	Hồ Xá	District

=== Sơn La province ===
Name	Capital	Status
Bắc Yên	Bắc Yên	District
Mai Sơn	Hát Lót	District
Mộc Châu		Town
Mường La	Ít Ong	District
Phù Yên	Phù Yên	District
Quỳnh Nhai	Mường Giàng	District
**Sơn La**		City
Sông Mã	Sông Mã	District
Sốp Cộp	Sốp Cộp	District
Thuận Châu	Thuận Châu	District
Vân Hồ	Vân Hồ	District
Yên Châu	Yên Châu	District

=== Tây Ninh province ===
Name	Capital	Status
Bến Cầu	Bến Cầu	District
Châu Thành	Châu Thành	District
Dương Minh Châu	Dương Minh Châu	District
Gò Dầu	Gò Dầu	District
Hòa Thành		Town
Tân Biên	Tân Biên	District
Tân Châu	Tân Châu	District
**Tây Ninh**		City
Trảng Bàng		Town

=== Thái Nguyên province ===
Name	Capital	Status
Đại Từ	Hùng Sơn	District
Định Hóa	Chợ Chu	District
Đồng Hỷ	Hóa Thượng	District
Phổ Yên		City
Phú Bình	Hương Sơn	District
Phú Lương	Đu	District
Sông Công		City
**Thái Nguyên**		City
Võ Nhai	Đình Cả	District

=== Thanh Hóa province ===
Name	Capital	Status
Bá Thước	Cành Nàng	District
Bỉm Sơn		Town
Cẩm Thủy	Phong Sơn	District
Hà Trung	Hà Trung	District
Hậu Lộc	Hậu Lộc	District
Hoằng Hóa	Bút Sơn	District
Lang Chánh	Lang Chánh	District
Mường Lát	Mường Lát	District
Nga Sơn	Nga Sơn	District
Nghi Sơn		Town
Ngọc Lặc	Ngọc Lặc	District
Như Thanh	Bến Sung	District
Như Xuân	Yên Cát	District
Nông Cống	Nông Cống	District
Quan Hóa	Hồi Xuân	District
Quan Sơn	Sơn Lư	District
Quảng Xương	Tân Phong	District
Sầm Sơn		City
Thạch Thành	Kim Tân	District
**Thanh Hóa**		City
Thiệu Hóa	Thiệu Hóa	District
Thọ Xuân	Thọ Xuân	District
Thường Xuân	Thường Xuân	District
Triệu Sơn	Triệu Sơn	District
Vĩnh Lộc	Vĩnh Lộc	District
Yên Định	Quán Lào	District

=== Tuyên Quang province ===
Name	Capital	Status
Chiêm Hóa	Vĩnh Lộc	District
Hàm Yên	Tân Yên	District
Lâm Bình	Lăng Can	District
Na Hang	Na Hang	District
Sơn Dương	Sơn Dương	District
**Tuyên Quang**		City
Yên Sơn	Yên Sơn	District

=== Vĩnh Long province ===
Name	Capital	Status
Bình Minh		Town
Bình Tân	Tân Quới	District
Long Hồ	Long Hồ	District
Mang Thít	Cái Nhum	District
Tam Bình	Tam Bình	District
Trà Ôn	Trà Ôn	District
**Vĩnh Long**		City
Vũng Liêm	Vũng Liêm	District

== Former province ==
=== Bà Rịa–Vũng Tàu province ===
Name	Capital	Status
**Bà Rịa**		City
Châu Đức	Ngãi Giao	District
Côn Đảo	Côn Sơn	District
Đất Đỏ	Đất Đỏ	District
Long Điền	Long Điền	District
Phú Mỹ		Town
Vũng Tàu		City
Xuyên Mộc	Phước Bửu	District

=== Bắc Giang province ===
Name	Capital	Status
**Bắc Giang**		City
Chũ		Town
Hiệp Hòa	Thắng	District
Lạng Giang	Vôi	District
Lục Nam	Đồi Ngô	District
Lục Ngạn	Phì Điền	District
Sơn Động	An Châu	District
Tân Yên	Cao Thượng	District
Việt Yên		Town
Yên Thế	Phồn Xương	District

=== Bắc Kạn province ===
Name	Capital	Status
Ba Bể	Chợ Rã	District
**Bắc Kạn**		City
Bạch Thông	Phủ Thông	District
Chợ Đồn	Bằng Lũng	District
Chợ Mới	Chợ Mới	District
Na Rì	Yến Lạc	District
Ngân Sơn	Vân Tùng	District
Pác Nặm	Bộc Bố	District

=== Bạc Liêu province ===
Name	Capital	Status
**Bạc Liêu**		City
Đông Hải	Gành Hào	District
Giá Rai		Town
Hòa Bình	Hòa Bình	District
Hồng Dân	Ngan Dừa	District
Phước Long	Phước Long	District
Vĩnh Lợi	Châu Hưng	District

=== Bến Tre province ===
Name	Capital	Status
Ba Tri	Ba Tri	District
**Bến Tre**		City
Bình Đại	Bình Đại	District
Châu Thành	Châu Thành	District
Chợ Lách	Chợ Lách	District
Giồng Trôm	Giồng Trôm	District
Mỏ Cày Bắc	Phước Mỹ Trung	District
Mỏ Cày Nam	Mỏ Cày	District
Thạnh Phú	Thạnh Phú	District

=== Bình Định province ===
Name	Capital	Status
An Lão	An Lão	District
An Nhơn		Town
Hoài Ân	Tăng Bạt Hổ	District
Hoài Nhơn		Town
Phù Cát	Ngô Mây	District
Phù Mỹ	Phù Mỹ	District
**Quy Nhon**		City
Tây Sơn	Phú Phong	District
Tuy Phước	Tuy Phước	District
Vân Canh	Vân Canh	District
Vĩnh Thạnh	Vĩnh Thạnh	District

=== Bình Dương province ===
Name	Capital	Status
Bắc Tân Uyên	Tân Thành	District
Bàu Bàng	Lai Uyên	District
Bến Cát		City
Dầu Tiếng	Dầu Tiếng	District
Dĩ An		City
Phú Giáo	Phước Vĩnh	District
Tân Uyên		City
**Thủ Dầu Một**		City
Thuận An		City

=== Bình Phước province ===
Name	Capital	Status
Bình Long		Town
Bù Đăng	Đức Phong	District
Bù Đốp	Thanh Bình	District
Bù Gia Mập	Phú Nghĩa	District
Chơn Thành		Town
Đồng Phú	Tân Phú	District
**Đồng Xoài**		City
Hớn Quản	Tân Khai	District
Lộc Ninh	Lộc Ninh	District
Phú Riềng	Bù Nho	District
Phước Long		Town

=== Bình Thuận province ===
Name	Capital	Status
Bắc Bình	Chợ Lầu	District
Đức Linh	Võ Xu	District
Hàm Tân	Tân Nghĩa	District
Hàm Thuận Bắc	Ma Lâm	District
Hàm Thuận Nam	Thuận Nam	District
La Gi		Town
**Phan Thiết**		City
Phú Quý	Ngũ Phụng	District
Tánh Linh	Lạc Tánh	District
Tuy Phong	Liên Hương	District

=== Đắk Nông province ===
Name	Capital	Status
Cư Jút	Ea T'ling	District
Đăk Glong	Quảng Khê	District
Đăk Mil	Đăk Mil	District
Đăk R'Lấp	Kiến Đức	District
Đăk Song	Đắk Song	District
**Gia Nghĩa**		City
Krông Nô	Đắk Mâm	District
Tuy Đức	Đắk Buk So	District

=== Hà Giang province ===
Name	Capital	Status
Bắc Mê	Yên Phú	District
Bắc Quang	Vĩnh Tuy	District
Đồng Văn	Đồng Văn	District
**Hà Giang**		City
Hoàng Su Phì	Vinh Quang	District
Mèo Vạc	Mèo Vạc	District
Quản Bạ	Tam Sơn	District
Quang Bình	Yên Bình	District
Vị Xuyên	Vị Xuyên	District
Xín Mần	Cốc Pài	District
Yên Minh	Yên Minh	District

=== Hà Nam province ===
Name	Capital	Status
Bình Lục	Bình Mỹ	District
Duy Tiên		Town
Kim Bảng		Town
Lý Nhân	Vĩnh Trụ	District
**Phủ Lý**		City
Thanh Liêm	Tân Thanh	District

=== Hải Dương province ===
Name	Capital	Status
Bình Giang	Kẻ Sặt	District
Cẩm Giàng	Lai Cách	District
Chí Linh		City
Gia Lộc	Gia Lộc	District
**Hải Dương**		City
Kim Thành	Phú Thái	District
Kinh Môn		Town
Nam Sách	Nam Sách	District
Ninh Giang	Ninh Giang	District
Thanh Hà	Thanh Hà	District
Thanh Miện	Thanh Miện	District
Tứ Kỳ	Tứ Kỳ	District

=== Hậu Giang province ===
Name	Capital	Status
Châu Thành	Ngã Sáu	District
Châu Thành A	Một Ngàn	District
Long Mỹ		Town
Long Mỹ	Vĩnh Viễn	District
Ngã Bảy		City
Phụng Hiệp	Cây Dương	District
**Vị Thanh**		City
Vị Thủy	Nàng Mau	District

=== Hòa Bình province ===
Name	Capital	Status
Cao Phong	Cao Phong	District
Đà Bắc	Đà Bắc	District
**Hòa Bình**		City
Kim Bôi	Bo	District
Lạc Sơn	Vụ Bản	District
Lạc Thủy	Chi Nê	District
Lương Sơn	Lương Sơn	District
Mai Châu	Mai Châu	District
Tân Lạc	Mãn Đức	District
Yên Thủy	Hàng Trạm	District

=== Kiên Giang province ===
Name	Capital	Status
An Biên	Thứ Ba	District
An Minh	Thứ Mười Một	District
Châu Thành	Minh Lương	District
Giang Thành	Tân Khánh Hòa	District
Giồng Riềng	Giồng Riềng	District
Gò Quao	Gò Quao	District
Hà Tiên		City
Hòn Đất	Hòn Đất	District
Kiên Hải	Hon Tre	District
Kiên Lương	Kiên Lương	District
Phú Quốc		City
**Rạch Giá**		City
Tân Hiệp	Tân Hiệp	District
Vĩnh Thuận	Vĩnh Thuận	District
U Minh Thượng	Thạnh Yên	District

=== Kon Tum province ===
Name	Capital	Status
Đắk Glei	Đắk Glei	District
Đắk Hà	Đắk Hà	District
Đăk Tô	Đăk Tô	District
Ia H'Drai	Ia Tơi	District
Kon Plông	Măng Đen	District
Kon Rẫy	Tân Lập	District
**Kon Tum**		City
Ngọc Hồi	Plei Kần	District
Sa Thầy	Sa Thầy	District
Tu Mơ Rông	Đăk Hà	District

=== Long An province ===
Name	Capital	Status
Bến Lức	Bến Lức	District
Cần Đước	Cần Đước	District
Cần Giuộc	Cần Giuộc	District
Châu Thành	Tầm Vu	District
Đức Hòa	Hậu Nghĩa	District
Đức Huệ	Đông Thành	District
Kiến Tường		Town
Mộc Hóa	Bình Phong Thạnh	District
**Tân An**		City
Tân Hưng	Tân Hưng	District
Tân Thạnh	Tân Thạnh	District
Tân Trụ	Tân Trụ	District
Thạnh Hóa	Thạnh Hóa	District
Thủ Thừa	Thủ Thừa	District
Vĩnh Hưng	Vĩnh Hưng	District

=== Nam Định province ===
Name	Capital	Status
Giao Thủy	Giao Thủy	District
Hải Hậu	Yên Định	District
**Nam Định**		City
Nam Trực	Nam Giang	District
Nghĩa Hưng	Liễu Đề	District
Trực Ninh	Cổ Lễ	District
Vụ Bản	Gôi	District
Xuân Trường	Xuân Trường	District
Ý Yên	Lâm	District

=== Ninh Thuận province ===
Name	Capital	Status
Bác Ái	Phước Đại	District
Ninh Hải	Khánh Hải	District
Ninh Phước	Phước Dân	District
Ninh Sơn	Tân Sơn	District
**Phan Rang–Tháp Chàm**		City
Thuận Bắc	Lợi Hải	District
Thuận Nam	Phước Nam	District

=== Phú Yên province ===
Name	Capital	Status
Đông Hòa		Town
Đồng Xuân	La Hai	District
Phú Hòa	Phú Hòa	District
Sơn Hòa	Củng Sơn	District
Sông Cầu		Town
Sông Hinh	Hai Riêng	District
Tây Hòa	Phú Thứ	District
Tuy An	Chí Thạnh	District
**Tuy Hòa**		City

=== Quảng Bình province ===
Name	Capital	Status
Ba Đồn		Town
Bố Trạch	Hoàn Lão	District
**Đồng Hới**		City
Lệ Thủy	Kiến Giang	District
Minh Hóa	Quy Đạt	District
Quảng Ninh	Quán Hàu	District
Quảng Trạch	Quảng Phương	District
Tuyên Hóa	Đồng Lê	District

=== Quảng Nam province ===
Name	Capital	Status
Bắc Trà My	Trà My	District
Đại Lộc	Ái Nghĩa	District
Điện Bàn		Town
Đông Giang	Prao	District
Duy Xuyên	Nam Phước	District
Hiệp Đức	Tân Bình	District
Hội An		City
Nam Giang	Thạnh Mỹ	District
Nam Trà My	Trà Mai	District
Nông Sơn	Trung Phước	District
Núi Thành	Núi Thành	District
Phước Sơn	Khâm Đức	District
Quế Sơn	Đông Phú	District
**Tam Kỳ**		City
Tây Giang	A Tiêng	District
Thăng Bình	Hà Lam	District
Tiên Phước	Tiên Kỳ	District

=== Sóc Trăng province ===
Name	Capital	Status
Châu Thành	Châu Thành	District
Cù Lao Dung	Cù Lao Dung	District
Long Phú	Long Phú	District
Kế Sách	Kế Sách	District
Mỹ Tú	Huỳnh Hữu Nghĩa	District
Mỹ Xuyên	Mỹ Xuyên	District
Ngã Năm		Town
**Sóc Trăng**		City
Thạnh Trị	Phú Lộc	District
Trần Đề	Trần Đề	District
Vĩnh Châu		Town

=== Thái Bình province ===
Name	Capital	Status
Đông Hưng	Đông Hưng	District
Hưng Hà	Hưng Hà	District
Kiến Xương	Kiến Xương	District
Quỳnh Phụ	Quỳnh Côi	District
**Thái Bình**		City
Thái Thụy	Diêm Điền	District
Tiền Hải	Tiền Hải	District
Vũ Thư	Vũ Thư	District

=== Tiền Giang province ===
Name	Capital	Status
Cái Bè	Cái Bè	District
Cai Lậy		Town
Cai Lậy	Bình Phú	District
Chợ Gạo	Chợ Gạo	District
Châu Thành	Tân Hiệp	District
Gò Công		Town
Gò Công Đông	Tân Hòa	District
Gò Công Tây	Vĩnh Bình	District
**Mỹ Tho**		City
Tân Phú Đông	Phú Thạnh	District
Tân Phước	Mỹ Phước	District

=== Trà Vinh province ===
Name	Capital	Status
Càng Long	Càng Long	District
Cầu Kè	Cầu Kè	District
Cầu Ngang	Cầu Ngang	District
Châu Thành	Châu Thành	District
Duyên Hải		Town
Duyên Hải	Ngũ Lạc	District
Tiểu Cần	Tiểu Cần	District
Trà Cú	Trà Cú	District
**Trà Vinh**		City

=== Vĩnh Phúc province ===
Name	Capital	Status
Bình Xuyên	Hương Canh	District
Lập Thạch	Lập Thạch	District
Phúc Yên		City
Sông Lô	Tam Sơn	District
Tam Đảo	Hợp Châu	District
Tam Dương	Hợp Hòa	District
Vĩnh Tường	Vĩnh Tường	District
**Vĩnh Yên**		City
Yên Lạc	Yên Lạc	District

=== Yên Bái province ===
Name	Capital	Status
Lục Yên	Yên Thế	District
Mù Cang Chải	Mù Cang Chải	District
Nghĩa Lộ		Town
Trạm Tấu	Trạm Tấu	District
Trấn Yên	Cổ Phúc	District
Văn Chấn	Sơn Thịnh	District
Văn Yên	Mậu A	District
**Yên Bái**		City
Yên Bình	Yên Bình	District
