= Electoral divisions of Vietnam =

For electoral purpose, each province or municipality (the highest administrative division) of Vietnam is subdivided into electoral units (đơn vị bầu cử) which are further subdivided into voting zones (khu vực bỏ phiếu). The number of electoral divisions varies from election to election and depend on the population of that province or municipality

During Vietnam’s 2011 parliamentary elections, there were 183 electoral units and 89,960 voting zones.

== Election ==
see also Elections in Vietnam

Delegates of the National Assembly of Vietnam are directly elected from population for a five-year term. The National Assembly of Vietnam is unicameral, therefore the number of delegates in an area depends on the population of that area. Currently there are 500 delegates of the National Assembly.

== Electoral divisions ==
Vietnam is a unitary state with 27 provinces and 7 municipalities or centrally-controlled cities. Each province (tỉnh) and municipality (thành phố trực thuộc trung ương) is subdivided into electoral units (đơn vị bầu cử). The number of electoral divisions in each province and municipality depends on the population of that province and municipality. Normally an electoral unit within a province or municipality covers about 2 to 6 district-level subdivisions (đơn vị hành chính cấp huyện; which could be rural districts (huyện), urban districts (quận), provincial cities (thành phố thuộc tỉnh) or towns (thị xã)).

Each electoral unit is further subdivided into voting zones (khu vực bỏ phiếu). Two or three delegates would be elected from each electoral unit.

Since 2011 there are 183 electoral units and 89,960 voting zones.

=== Municipalities ===
==== Hà Nội City ====
10 electoral units and 30 delegates

Electoral unit	Area	Number of elected delegates
1	Ba Đình district Hoàn Kiếm district Tây Hồ district	3
2	Đống Đa district Hai Bà Trưng district	3
3	Hà Đông district Thanh Xuân district Cầu Giấy district	3
4	Thanh Trì district Gia Lâm district Hoàng Mai district	3
5	Đan Phượng district Hoài Đức district Từ Liêm district	3
6	Ứng Hòa district Mỹ Đức district Phú Xuyên district Thường Tín district	3
7	Quốc Oai district Chương Mỹ district Thanh Oai district	3
8	Ba Vì district Phúc Thọ district Thạch Thất district Sơn Tây Town	3
9	Đông Anh district Long Biên district	3
10	Sóc Sơn district Mê Linh district	3

==== Hải Phòng City ====
3 electoral units and 9 delegates

Electoral unit	Area	Number of elected delegates
1	Thủy Nguyên district Cát Hải district Bạch Long Vĩ district Hồng Bàng district Lê Chân district	3
2	An Dương district Kiến Thụy district Ngô Quyền district Hải An district Đồ Sơn district	3
3	An Lão district Tiên Lãng district Vĩnh Bảo district Kiến An district Dương Kinh district	3

==== Đà Nẵng City ====
2 electoral units and 6 delegates

Electoral unit	Area	Number of elected delegates
1	Hòa Vang district Hoàng Sa district Hải Châu district Sơn Trà district	3
2	Thanh Khê district Liên Chiểu district Ngũ Hành Sơn district Cẩm Lệ district	3

==== Hồ Chí Minh City ====
10 electoral units and 30 delegates

Electoral unit	Area	Number of elected delegates
1	District 1 District 3 District 4	3
2	Nhà Bè district Cần Giờ district District 7	3
3	District 6 Bình Tân district	3
4	District 5 District 10; District 11	3
5	Tân Bình district Tân Phú district	3
6	Bình Thạnh district Phú Nhuận district	3
7	Thủ Đức City	3
8	District 12; Gò Vấp district	3
9	Củ Chi district Hóc Môn district	3
10	District 8 Bình Chánh district	3

==== Cần Thơ City ====
3 electoral units and 7 delegates

Electoral unit	Area	Number of elected delegates
1	Ninh Kiều district Bình Thủy district Cái Răng district Phong Điền district	3
2	Ô Môn district Cờ Đỏ district Thới Lai district	2
3	Thốt Nốt district Vĩnh Thạnh district	2

=== Provinces ===
Province	Number of electoral units	Number of elected delegates
An Giang province	4	10
Bà Rịa–Vũng Tàu province	2	6
Bắc Giang province	3	8
Bắc Kạn province	2	6
Bạc Liêu province	2	6
Bắc Ninh province	2	6
Bến Tre province	3	7
Bình Dương province	3	8
Bình Định province	3	8
Bình Phước province	2	6
Bình Thuận province	3	7
Cà Mau province	3	7
Cao Bằng province	2	6
Đắk Lắk province	3	9
Đắk Nông province	2	6
Điện Biên province	2	6
Đồng Nai province	4	11
Đồng Tháp province	3	8
Gia Lai province	3	7
Hà Giang province	2	6
Hà Nam province	2	6
Hà Tĩnh province	3	7
Hải Dương province	3	9
Hậu Giang province	2	6
Hòa Bình province	2	6
Hưng Yên province	3	7
Khánh Hòa province	3	7
Kiên Giang province	3	9
Kon Tum province	2	6
Lai Châu province	2	6
Lạng Sơn province	2	6
Lào Cai province	2	6
Lâm Đồng province	3	7
Long An province	3	8
Nam Định province	3	9
Nghệ An province	5	13
Ninh Bình province	2	6
Ninh Thuận province	2	6
Phú Thọ province	3	7
Phú Yên province	2	6
Quảng Bình province	2	6
Quảng Nam province	3	8
Quảng Ngãi province	3	7
Quảng Ninh province	3	7
Quảng Trị province	2	6
Sóc Trăng province	3	7
Sơn La province	3	7
Tây Ninh province	2	6
Thái Bình province	3	9
Thái Nguyên province	3	7
Thanh Hóa province	6	16
Thừa Thiên Huế province	3	7
Tiền Giang province	3	8
Trà Vinh province	2	6
Tuyên Quang province	2	5
Vĩnh Long province	2	6
Vĩnh Phúc province	3	6
Yên Bái province	2	7
