= Sê San Dam =

Vietnamese hydropower dam

Coordinates: 13.9684°N 107.4949°E

The Sê San Dam (Sê San Dam 4) is on the Sê San river at Ia Tơi commune, Ia H'Drai district and Ia O commune, Ia Grai district of Gia Lai province in Vietnam.

== Power generation ==
The Sê San Dam hydropower plant has 3 units with an installed capacity of 360 MW, which is the second largest hydropower plant (after Ia Ly hydroelectricity) on the Sesan river hydroelectricity system. By design, the electricity output supplied to the national grid is 1.4 billion kWh/year. However, in situation of severe drought and water shortage, it is inevitable that the power output supplied to the national power grid will be drastically reduced.

== Impacts ==
The Sê San Hydropower ensures electricity security for the region and nation, helping to stabilize the electricity system. This hydropower supports in generating local budget and improving local economy. With the collected budget, it is used for forest recovery, forest plantation towards sustainable development of forest.

Since its construction in 2004, Sê San Hydropower has been recently promoted tourism. From Pleiku city, about 70 km to the west, tourists will reach Ia O commune, Ia Grai district to visit the lake bed, the fishing village on the Se San hydroelectric lake, visit Mo waterfall, and then go through the cashew garden, rubber forest, etc. with the pristine natural landscape. Tourism has just been newly launched, so the service remains limited and welcomes mainly domestic tourists for river-experiencing tourism services in the Central Highlands.

== See also ==
- List of power stations in Vietnam
- List of conventional hydroelectric power stations
