= Cao Thượng =

Cao Thượng may refer to:

- Cao Thượng, Bac Giang, Vietnam
- Cao Thượng, Bac Kan, Vietnam
