= Đức An =

Đức An Xã Đức An
- Commune
- Đức An commune
- Location within Vietnam
- Coordinates: 12°15′16″N 107°36′40″E
- Country: Vietnam
- Region: Central Highlands
- Province: Lâm Đồng
- Time zone: UTC+7 (UTC + 7)

Đức An is a commune (xã) of Lâm Đồng Province, Vietnam.
