= Nguyễn Nhữ Soạn =

- 阮汝撰

General
- In office 1428–1448

Personal details
- Born: 1391 Mệ village, Cự Nạp commune, Đông Sơn prefect, Thanh Hóa region, Trần dynasty
- Died: 8 April 1448 (aged 56–57) Miên village, Mộc Nhuận commune, Đông Sơn district, Thiệu Thiên prefect, Thanh Hoa region, Later Lê dynasty
- Parent(s): Nguyễn Ứng Long (father); Nhữ Thị Ái (mother)
- Occupation: Politician

Nguyễn Nhữ Soạn (chữ Hán: 阮汝撰, 1391 - 1448), courtesy name Thủ Trung (首中), pseudonym Hiền Đức (賢德), posthumous name Hiền-đức Mister (橫敏先生), was an Annamese official.

== Biography ==
Nguyễn Nhữ Soạn was born in 1391 at Mệ village, Cự Nạp commune, Đông Sơn prefect, Thanh Hóa region of Trần era. He was the second son of official Nguyễn Ứng Long with second spouse Nhữ Thị Ái.

His full posthumous name was "Bình Ngô khai quốc suy tôn trang hiệp mưa dực vận phụ quốc bảo chính minh nghĩa công thành, ngân thạnh vinh lộc đại phu tả xa kị vệ, đại tướng quân, quan phục hầu, nhập thị nội hành khiếu, lĩnh chi Nam đạo, binh đâu bạ tịnh tham chi chính sự, Á Vũ hầu, Tuy quận công, tứ tính Lê thị, gia tăng Thái phó Tuy quốc công, Thượng đẳng Phúc thần, triệu mưu ta tích vệ quốc yên dâu bỉ liệt hàng hưu, thuần hi duyên huống, hiểu khách hành tu, khoan dung bác hậu, dực vận đắn trị, Tuy Du đại vương, quốc gia vĩ khí, xã tắc danh thần, Lam Sơn thư ứng nghĩa kỳ, cần sự tòng ư thỉ thạch, thiết khoái danh tân thái khắc đàng hưu vĩnh chỉ, ư sơn hà, ưu óc ký nhuận hoàng ân bao sũng tái kệ cựu điển lễ đương đăng trật nhà gia phong, hiệu quốc bảo dân hiền kiệt đại vượng".

Thủ ứng nghĩa kỳ
Bình Ngô đại kiến quay ngưu đẩu
Sinh vi lương tướng tử vi thần
Công tại tiền triều danh tại sử

— The court awarded posthumously

== Family ==
- Father : Nguyễn Ứng Long
- Mother : Nhữ Thị Ái (courtesy name Ngọc Hoàn)
- Younger brother : Nguyễn Nhữ Trạch
- First spouse Nguyễn Thị Tài (from Lam Sơn) who gave birth to Nguyễn Nhữ Trực
- Second spouse Nguyễn Thị Chũy who gave birth to Nguyễn Nhữ Ngộ
- Third spouse Chu Thị Triều who gave birth to Nguyễn Nhữ Lương

== See also ==
- Nguyễn Trãi
- Nguyễn Nhữ Lãm
- Nguyễn Nhữ Trạch
- Trần Nguyên Hãn
- Ngô Sĩ Liên
