= List of urban districts of Vietnam =

Former second-level administrative unit of Vietnam

Urban district (Vietnamese: quận), or borough, was a former type of second tier subdivision in Vietnam. Urban district had equal status with district, provincial city, and town.

Urban districts can only subordinate to municipality as the Second Tier unit. At the Third Tier, urban district was divided into wards.

== History ==
Before 1975, in South Vietnam, all second-level administrative subdivisions were called districts (quận), regardless of urban or rural areas. For example, quận Châu Thành, Vĩnh Long Province is in the urban area of present Vĩnh Long city, and quận Trà Ôn was the rural area of present Vĩnh Long Province.

As of January 1, 2025, Vietnam had 49 urban districts. Ho Chi Minh City with 19 urban districts had the most. Huế City with two urban districts had the fewest.

In 2025, urban districts were abolished along with other district-level subdivisions.

== List of urban districts in Vietnam ==
Hanoi (12 urban districts)

- Ba Đình District
- Hoàn Kiếm District
- Đống Đa District
- Hai Bà Trưng District
- Cầu Giấy District
- Thanh Xuân District
- Hoàng Mai District
- Long Biên District
- Tây Hồ District
- Hà Đông District
- Bắc Từ Liêm District (North Từ Liêm District)
- Nam Từ Liêm District (South Từ Liêm District)

Ho Chi Minh City (16 urban districts)

- District 1
- District 3
- District 4
- District 5
- District 6
- District 7
- District 8
- District 10
- District 11
- District 12
- Tân Bình District
- Tân Phú District
- Bình Tân District
- Phú Nhuận District
- Gò Vấp District
- Bình Thạnh District

Haiphong (8 urban districts)

- Hồng Bàng District
- Ngô Quyền District
- Lê Chân District
- Kiến An District
- Hải An District
- Dương Kinh District
- Đồ Sơn District
- An Dương District

Huế (2 urban districts)

- Phú Xuân District
- Thuận Hóa District

Da Nang (6 urban districts)

- Hải Châu District
- Thanh Khê District
- Sơn Trà District
- Ngũ Hành Sơn District
- Liên Chiểu District
- Cẩm Lệ District

Cần Thơ (5 urban districts)

- Ninh Kiều District
- Bình Thủy District
- Cái Răng District
- Ô Môn District
- Thốt Nốt District
