= Lai Chau =

Lai Chau may refer to:

- Lai Châu, the capital city of Lai Châu Province, Vietnam
- Lai Châu Province, Vietnam
- Hà Đông, the former capital city of Hà Tây Province, Vietnam
