= Ia Ly =

Ia Ly Xã Ia Ly
- Commune
- Ia Ly commune
- Location within Vietnam
- Coordinates: 14°12′24″N 107°50′14″E
- Country: Vietnam
- Region: Central Highlands
- Province: Gia Lai
- Time zone: UTC+7 (UTC + 7)

Ia Ly is a commune (xã) of Gia Lai Province, Vietnam.
