= Lê Chân district =

Lê Chân district Quận Lê Chân
- Urban district
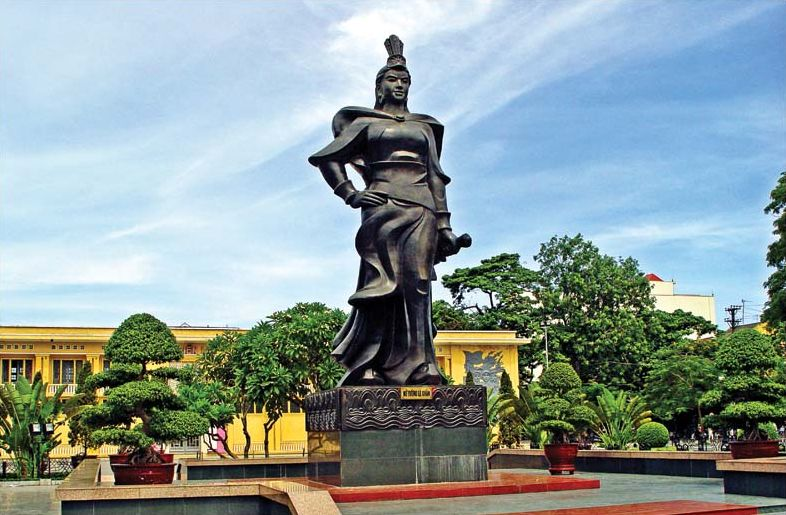
- Statue of Female General Lê Chân
- Interactive map of Lê Chân district
- Location within Vietnam
- Coordinates: 20°50′59″N 106°40′52″E
- Country: Vietnam
- Municipality: Haiphong

Area
  - Total: 12.31 km^{2} (4.75 sq mi)

Population (2019)
  - Total: 219,762
  - Density: 17,850/km^{2} (46,240/sq mi)
- Website: http://www.haiphong.gov.vn:8888/Portal/Default.aspx?Organization=QLC

Lê Chân is an urban district (quận) of Hai Phong, the third largest city of Vietnam.

== Geography ==
Lê Chân is located in the center of Haiphong and is bordered by Ngo Quyền to the east, An Dương to the west via the Đào Hạ Lý River, Kiến An to the west via the Lạch Tray River, Dương Kinh to the south with the Lạch Tray River forming the southern boundary, and Hồng Bàng to the north.

== History ==
Lê Chân, formerly known as the Lê Chân quarter of Haiphong, was established on July 5, 1961, through the merger of the Dư Hàng quarter with smaller areas from the former Cầu Đất and Hàng Kênh quarters. On January 3, 1981, it was renamed Lê Chân district, comprising 11 wards: An Biên, An Dương, Cát Dài, Đông Hải, Dư Hàng, Hàng Kênh, Hồ Nam, Lam Sơn, Mê Linh, Niệm Nghĩa, and Trại Cau.

On September 25, 1981, the wards of Lam Sơn and An Dương were reorganized, resulting in the creation of three separate wards: Lam Sơn, An Dương, and Trần Nguyên Hãn. Later, on December 20, 2002, the two communes of Dư Hàng Kênh and Vĩnh Niệm, previously part of the rural An Hải district, were transferred to Lê Chân for administrative management and upgraded to wards with the same names.

Further adjustments occurred on January 10, 2004, when the Niệm Nghĩa ward was split into two wards: Niệm Nghĩa and Nghĩa Xá. At the same time, Mê Linh ward was merged into An Biên ward. On April 5, 2007, Dư Hàng Kênh ward was divided into two wards: Dư Hàng Kênh and Kênh Dương.

Today, Lê Chân district consists of 15 wards: An Biên, An Dương, Cát Dài, Đông Hải, Dư Hàng, Dư Hàng Kênh, Hàng Kênh, Hồ Nam, Kênh Dương, Lam Sơn, Nghĩa Xá, Niệm Nghĩa, Trại Cau, Trần Nguyên Hãn, and Vĩnh Niệm.

== Economy ==
Lê Chân has only a few areas for agriculture and cultivation and the size of natural land is decreasing. Even though it is no major economic, political or cultural center, Lê Chân is home to many facilities for industrial and handicraft production. The average GDP growth rate has been over many years a double-digit growth rate (25–31% per year).

== Infrastructure ==
Nowadays Lê Chân is developing its investments for the construction of the Waterfront City urban area located at the territory of the Vĩnh Niệm ward.

== Education ==
Lê Chân has a number of universities and colleges, e.g.:

- Vietnam Maritime University (Đại học Hàng hải Việt Nam)
- Haiphong Private University (Đại học Dân lập Hải Phòng)
- Haiphong University of Management and Technology (Đại học Quản lý và Công Nghệ Hải Phòng)
- Haiphong Medical College (Cao đẳng Y tế Hải Phòng)
- College of Technology, Economics and Fisheries (Cao đẳng nghề Công nghệ, Kinh tế và Thủy sản)

== Healthcare ==
Some of the hospitals in Lê Chân are:

- Vietnamese-Czechoslovak Friendship Hospital (Bệnh viện Hữu Nghị Việt Tiệp)
- Haiphong International General Hospital (Bệnh viện Đa khoa quốc tế Hải Phòng)
- Haiphong Vinmec International General Hospital (Bệnh viện Đa khoa Quốc tế Vinmec Hải Phòng)
- Green International Hospital (Bệnh viện Quốc tế Green)
