= Cao Xá =

Cao Xá may refer to several places in Vietnam, including:

- Cao Xá, Bắc Giang, a commune of Tân Yên District
- Cao Xá, Phú Thọ, a commune of Lâm Thao District
