= Khánh Vĩnh =

Khánh Vĩnh Xã Khánh Vĩnh
- Commune
- Location within Vietnam
- Coordinates: 12°16′47″N 108°54′30″E
- Country: Vietnam
- Region: South Central Coast
- Province: Khánh Hòa
- Time zone: UTC+7 (UTC + 7)

Khánh Vĩnh is a commune (xã) of Khánh Hòa Province, Vietnam.
