= Hòn Đất =

Hòn Đất Xã Hòn Đất
- Commune
- Hòn Đất commune
- Location within Vietnam
- Coordinates: 10°11′14″N 104°55′36″E
- Country: Vietnam
- Region: Mekong Delta
- Province: An Giang
- Time zone: UTC+7 (UTC + 7)

Hòn Đất is a commune (xã) of An Giang Province, Vietnam.
