= Vĩnh Tuy, Tuyên Quang =

Vĩnh Tuy Xã Vĩnh Tuy
- Commune
- Vĩnh Tuy commune
- Location within Vietnam
- Coordinates: 22°16′32″N 104°53′28″E
- Country: Vietnam
- Region: Northeast
- Province: Tuyên Quang
- Time zone: UTC+7 (UTC + 7)

Vĩnh Tuy is a commune (xã) of Tuyên Quang Province, Vietnam.
