= Thường Xuân district =

Coordinates: 19.917°N 105.250°E

Thường Xuân district Huyện Thường Xuân
- District
- Interactive map of Thường Xuân district
- Country: Vietnam
- Region: North Central Coast
- Province: Thanh Hóa

Area
  - Total: 354 sq mi (918 km^{2})

Population (2018)
  - Total: 104,920
- Time zone: UTC+7 (UTC + 7)

Thường Xuân is a district (huyện) of Thanh Hóa province in the North Central Coast region of Vietnam.

As of 2003 the district had a population of 88,162 . The district covers an area of 918 km^{2}. The district capital lies at Thường Xuân.
