= Lập Thạch =

Lập Thạch Xã Lập Thạch
- Commune
- Location within Vietnam
- Coordinates: 21°24′53″N 105°27′41″E
- Country: Vietnam
- Region: Red River Delta
- Province: Phú Thọ
- Established: 16/6/2025
- Seat: Vĩnh Tường commune, DT307

Area
  - Total: 1,510 sq mi (3,910 km^{2})

Population (2025)
  - Total: 34,604
  - Density: 2,290/sq mi (885/km^{2})
- Time zone: UTC+7 (UTC + 7)
- Postal code: 15406
- Area code: 08761
- Website: lapthach.phutho.gov.vn

Lập Thạch is a commune (xã) of Phú Thọ Province, Vietnam.
