= Na Hang =

Na Hang Xã Na Hang
- Commune
- Location within Vietnam
- Coordinates: 22°20′53″N 105°22′58″E
- Country: Vietnam
- Region: Northeast
- Province: Tuyên Quang
- Time zone: UTC+7 (UTC + 7)

Na Hang is a commune (xã) of Tuyên Quang province, Vietnam.
