= Đắk Mil =

Đắk Mil Xã Đắk Mil
- Commune
- Đắk Mil commune
- Location within Vietnam
- Coordinates: 12°26′56″N 107°37′14″E
- Country: Vietnam
- Region: Central Highlands
- Province: Lâm Đồng
- Time zone: UTC+7 (UTC + 7)

Đắk Mil is a commune (xã) of Lâm Đồng Province, Vietnam.
