= Bắc Mê, Tuyên Quang =

Bắc Mê Xã Bắc Mê
- Commune
- Bắc Mê commune
- Location within Vietnam
- Coordinates: 22°44′27″N 105°19′00″E
- Country: Vietnam
- Region: Northeast
- Province: Tuyên Quang
- Time zone: UTC+7 (UTC + 7)

Bắc Mê is a commune (xã) of Tuyên Quang Province, Vietnam.

The entire natural area and population of Yên Phú Township, Yên Phong Commune, and Lạc Nông Commune are rearranged to form a new commune named Bắc Mê Commune.
