= Phú Tâm =

Phú Tâm Xã Phú Tâm
- Commune
- Phú Tâm commune
- Location within Vietnam
- Coordinates: 9°42′13″N 105°54′04″E
- Country: Vietnam
- Region: Mekong Delta
- Province: Cần Thơ
- Time zone: UTC+7 (UTC + 7)

Phú Tâm is a commune (xã) of Cần Thơ, Vietnam.
