= Ái Tử =

Ái Tử Xã Ái Tử
- Commune
- Ái Tử commune
- Location within Vietnam
- Coordinates: 16°46′23″N 107°09′43″E
- Country: Vietnam
- Region: North Central Coast
- Province: Quảng Trị
- Time zone: UTC+7 (UTC + 7)

Dong Hoi in Quang Tri Province, during a typhoon in 2013.

Ái Tử is a commune (xã) of Quảng Trị Province, Vietnam.

On June 16, 2025, the Standing Committee of the National Assembly issued Resolution No. 1680/NQ-UBTVQH15 on the reorganization of commune-level administrative units in Quảng Trị Province in 2025. Accordingly, Triệu Ái Commune, Triệu Giang Commune, and Triệu Long Commune were merged to form Ái Tử Commune.
