= Si Ma Cai =

Si Ma Cai Xã Si Ma Cai
- Commune
- Si Ma Cai commune
- Location within Vietnam
- Coordinates: 22°41′29″N 104°16′32″E
- Country: Vietnam
- Region: Northwest
- Province: Lào Cai
- Time zone: UTC+7 (UTC + 7)

Si Ma Cai is a commune (xã) of Lào Cai Province, Vietnam.
