= Vĩnh Thạnh, Gia Lai =

Vĩnh Thạnh Xã Vĩnh Thạnh
- Commune
- Vĩnh Thạnh commune
- Location within Vietnam
- Coordinates: 14°06′22″N 108°46′59″E
- Country: Vietnam
- Region: South Central Coast
- Province: Gia Lai
- Time zone: UTC+7 (UTC + 7)

Vĩnh Thạnh is a commune (xã) of Gia Lai Province, Vietnam.
