= Hạ Lang, Cao Bằng =

Hạ Lang Xã Hạ Lang
- Commune
- Hạ Lang commune
- Location within Vietnam
- Coordinates: 22°41′18″N 106°40′19″E
- Country: Vietnam
- Region: Northeast
- Province: Cao Bằng
- Time zone: UTC+7 (UTC + 7)

Hạ Lang is a commune (xã) of Cao Bằng Province, Vietnam.

On June 16, 2025, the Standing Committee of the National Assembly issued Resolution No. 1657/NQ-UBTVQH15 on the reorganization of commune-level administrative units in Cao Bằng Province in 2025. Accordingly, the entire natural area and population of Thanh Nhật Township, Thống Nhất Commune, and Thị Hoa Commune were reorganized to form a new commune named Hạ Lang.
