= Đăk Pék =

Đăk Pék Xã Đăk Pék
- Commune
- Đăk Pék commune
- Location within Vietnam
- Coordinates: 15°04′42″N 107°44′21″E
- Country: Vietnam
- Region: Central Highlands
- Province: Quảng Ngãi
- Time zone: UTC+7 (UTC + 7)

Đăk Pék is a commune (xã) of Quảng Ngãi Province, Vietnam.

The Standing Committee of the National Assembly issued Resolution No. 1677/NQ-UBTVQH15 on the reorganization of commune-level administrative units of Quảng Ngãi Province in 2025 (the resolution takes effect on June 16, 2025). Accordingly, the entire natural area and population size of Đăk Glei Township and Đăk Pék Commune shall be consolidated to form a new commune named Đăk Pék Commune.
