= Sông Mã, Sơn La =

Sông Mã Xã Sông Mã
- Commune
- Sông Mã commune
- Location within Vietnam
- Coordinates: 21°03′10″N 103°44′55″E
- Country: Vietnam
- Region: Northwest
- Province: Sơn La
- Time zone: UTC+7 (UTC + 7)

Sông Mã is a commune (xã) of Sơn La Province, Vietnam.

The Standing Committee of the National Assembly issued Resolution No. 1681/NQ-UBTVQH15 on the rearrangement of commune-level administrative units of Sơn La Province in 2025 (the resolution takes effect from June 16, 2025). Accordingly, the entire natural area and population of Sông Mã Township and Nà Nghịu Commune are reorganized to form a new commune named Sông Mã Commune.
