= Quang Bình, Tuyên Quang =

Quang Bình Xã Quang Bình
- Commune
- Quang Bình commune
- Location within Vietnam
- Coordinates: 22°24′43″N 104°34′58″E
- Country: Vietnam
- Region: Northeast
- Province: Tuyên Quang
- Time zone: UTC+7 (UTC + 7)

Quang Bình is a commune (xã) of Tuyên Quang Province, Vietnam.

On 16 June 2025, the Standing Committee of the National Assembly promulgated Resolution No. 1684/NQ-UBTVQH15 on the rearrangement of commune-level administrative units of Tuyên Quang Province in 2025. Accordingly, the entire natural area and population of Yên Bình Township and Tân Nam Commune are rearranged to form a new commune named Quang Bình Commune.
