= Cờ Đỏ =

Cờ Đỏ Xã Cờ Đỏ
- Commune
- Cờ Đỏ commune
- Location within Vietnam
- Coordinates: 10°05′39″N 105°25′46″E
- Country: Vietnam
- Region: Mekong Delta
- Municipality: Cần Thơ
- Time zone: UTC+7 (UTC + 7)

Cờ Đỏ is a commune (xã) of Cần Thơ, Vietnam.
