= Lộc Hà =

Lộc Hà Xã Lộc Hà
- Commune
- Lộc Hà commune
- Location within Vietnam
- Coordinates: 18°27′16″N 105°54′14″E
- Country: Vietnam
- Region: North Central Coast
- Province: Hà Tĩnh
- Time zone: UTC+7 (UTC + 7)

Lộc Hà is a commune (xã) of Hà Tĩnh Province, Vietnam.
