= Văn Yên district =

Văn Yên District Huyện Văn Yên
- District
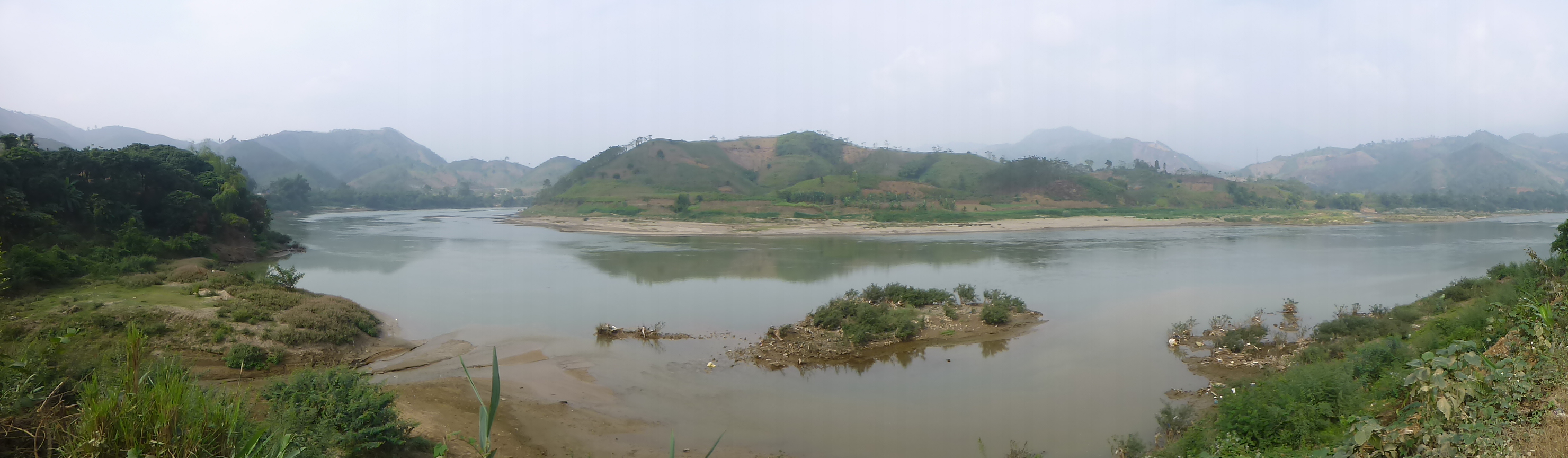
- The Red River in Văn Yên District

- Seal
- Interactive map of Văn Yên District
- Country: Vietnam
- Region: Northeast
- Province: Yên Bái
- Capital: Mậu A
- Subdivision: 1 township and 24 rural communes

Government
  - Type: District

Area
  - Total: 1,389 km^{2} (536 sq mi)

Population (2019)
  - Total: 129,679
  - Density: 93.36/km^{2} (241.8/sq mi)
- Time zone: UTC+7 (UTC + 7)
- Website: vanyen.yenbai.gov.vn

Văn Yên is a former rural district of Yên Bái province, in the Northeast region of Vietnam. As of 2019, the district had a population of 129,679. The district covers an area of 1389.0 km^{2}. The district capital lies at Mậu A.

== Administrative divisions ==
Văn Yên is divided into 25 commune-level sub-divisions, including the township of Mậu A and 24 rural communes (An Bình, An Thịnh, Châu Quế Hạ, Châu Quế Thượng, Đại Phác, Đại Sơn, Đông An, Đông Cuông, Lâm Giang, Lang Thíp, Mậu Đông, Mỏ Vàng, Nà Hẩu, Ngòi A, Phong Dụ Hạ, Phong Dụ Thượng, Quang Minh, Tân Hợp, Viễn Sơn, Xuân Ái, Xuân Tầm, Yên Hợp, Yên Phú, Yên Thái).
