= Chư Prông =

Chư Prông Xã Chư Prông
- Commune
- Chư Prông commune
- Location within Vietnam
- Coordinates: 13°45′16″N 107°53′11″E
- Country: Vietnam
- Region: Central Highlands
- Province: Gia Lai
- Time zone: UTC+7 (UTC + 7)

Chư Prông is a commune (xã) of Gia Lai Province, Vietnam.
