= Hạ Hòa =

Hạ Hòa Xã Hạ Hòa
- Commune
- Location in Vietnam
- Coordinates: 21°33′49″N 105°00′25″E
- Country: Vietnam
- Region: Northeast
- Province: Phú Thọ
- Established: 1997

Area
  - Total: 3.87 sq mi (10.03 km^{2})

Population (2019)
  - Total: 8,295 người
  - Density: 2,142/sq mi (827.0/km^{2})
- Time zone: UTC+07:00
- Administrative code: 08053

Hạ Hòa is a commune (xã) of Phú Thọ Province, Vietnam.
