= Kế Sách =

Kế Sách Xã Kế Sách
- Commune
- Kế Sách commune
- Location within Vietnam
- Coordinates: 9°46′09″N 105°59′08″E
- Country: Vietnam
- Region: Mekong Delta
- Province: Cần Thơ
- Time zone: UTC+7 (UTC + 7)

Kế Sách is a commune (xã) of Cần Thơ, Vietnam.
