= Chư Păh =

Chư Păh Xã Chư Păh
- Commune
- Chư Păh commune
- Location within Vietnam
- Coordinates: 14°06′06″N 107°58′23″E
- Country: Vietnam
- Region: Central Highlands
- Province: Gia Lai
- Time zone: UTC+7 (UTC + 7)

Chư Păh is a commune (xã) of Gia Lai Province, Vietnam. It is one of the 135 new wards and communes of the province following the reorganization in 2025.

On June 16, 2025, the Standing Committee of the National Assembly issued Resolution No. 1660/NQ-UBTVQH15 on the reorganization of commune-level administrative units in Gia Lai Province in 2025 (the resolution took effect on the date of its adoption). Accordingly, the entire natural area and population of Phú Hòa Township, Nghĩa Hòa Commune, and Hòa Phú Commune were consolidated to establish a new commune named Chư Păh Commune.
