= Tiểu Cần =

Tiểu Cần Phường Tiểu Cần
- Ward
- Tiểu Cần ward
- Location within Vietnam
- Coordinates: 9°48′43″N 106°11′25″E
- Country: Vietnam
- Region: Mekong Delta
- Province: Vĩnh Long
- Time zone: UTC+7 (UTC + 7)

Tiểu Cần is a ward (phường) of Vĩnh Long Province, Vietnam.
