= Châu Thành A district =

Coordinates: 9°55′50″N 105°38′31″E

Châu Thành A district Huyện Châu Thành A
- District
- Interactive map of Châu Thành A district
- Country: Vietnam
- Region: Mekong Delta
- Province: Hậu Giang

Population (2018)
  - Total: 163,357
- Time zone: UTC+7 (Indochina Time)

Châu Thành A is a rural district (huyện) of Hậu Giang province in the Mekong Delta region of Vietnam. In the wake of Government Decree 64/2000/ND-CP on November 6, 2000, Châu Thành A district, formerly of Cần Thơ, was reestablished by removing 22.139 km^{2} of land and 163,357 people from Châu Thành. At the time, Châu Thành A had eight administrative units, being Tân Thuận, Thạnh Xuân, Tân Hoà, Trường Long, Nhơn Ái, Nhơn Nghĩa, Trường Long Tây and Tân Phú Thạnh.

By Government Decree No. 05/2004/ND-CP dated January 2, 2004, Châu Thành A district acquired 5.31 km^{2} and 6,339 people from neighbouring Tân Phú Thạnh district to form the newly created Cái Răng, Nhơn Ái, Nhơn Nghĩa and Trường Long communes.

== Divisions ==
The district is divided into 8 communes:

Tân Thuận, Thạnh Xuân, Tân Hoà, Trường Long, Nhơn Ái, Nhơn Nghĩa, Trường Long Tây and Tân Phú Thạnh.
