= Tiên Du, Bắc Ninh =

Tiên Du Ward Tiên Du
- Ward
- Tiên Du commune
- Location within Vietnam
- Coordinates: 21°08′34″N 106°01′13″E
- Country: Vietnam
- Region: Red River Delta
- City: Bắc Ninh
- Time zone: UTC+7 (UTC + 7)
- Website: tiendu.bacninh.gov.vn

Tiên Du is a ward (phường) of Bắc Ninh, Vietnam.
