= Ia Pa district =

Ia Pa district Huyện Ia Pa
- District
- Interactive map of Ia Pa district
- Country: Vietnam
- Region: Central Highlands
- Province: Gia Lai province
- Capital: Kim Tân

Area
  - Total: 335.37 sq mi (868.60 km^{2})

Population (31/12/2024)
  - Total: 65,703
  - Density: 195.91/sq mi (75.642/km^{2})
- Time zone: UTC+7 (Indochina Time)

Ia Pa is a former district (huyện) of Gia Lai province in the Central Highlands region of Vietnam.

== History ==
As of 2003 the district had a population of 44,119. The district covers an area of 871 km², and the capital lies at Kim Tân.
