= Than Uyên =

Than Uyên Xã Than Uyên
- Commune
- Than Uyên commune
- Location within Vietnam
- Coordinates: 21°57′22″N 103°53′13″E
- Country: Vietnam
- Region: Northwest
- Province: Lai Châu
- Time zone: UTC+7 (UTC + 7)

Than Uyên is a commune (xã) of Lai Châu Province, Vietnam.
