= Kông Chro =

Kông Chro Xã Kông Chro
- Commune
- Kông Chro commune
- Location within Vietnam
- Coordinates: 13°46′44″N 108°31′34″E
- Country: Vietnam
- Region: Central Highlands
- Province: Gia Lai
- Time zone: UTC+7 (UTC + 7)

Kông Chro is a commune (xã) of Gia Lai Province, Vietnam.
