= Đak Pơ =

Đak Pơ Xã Đak Pơ
- Commune
- Đak Pơ commune
- Location within Vietnam
- Coordinates: 13°58′23″N 108°33′10″E
- Country: Vietnam
- Region: Central Highlands
- Province: Gia Lai
- Time zone: UTC+7 (UTC + 7)

Đak Pơ is a commune (xã) of Gia Lai Province, Vietnam.
