= Thường Xuân =

Thường Xuân Xã Thường Xuân
- Commune
- Thường Xuân commune
- Location within Vietnam
- Coordinates: 19°54′12″N 105°20′50″E
- Country: Vietnam
- Region: North Central Coast
- Province: Thanh Hóa
- Time zone: UTC+7 (UTC + 7)

Thường Xuân is a commune (xã) of Thanh Hóa Province, Vietnam.
