= Tân Trụ =

Tân Trụ Xã Tân Trụ
- Commune
- Tân Trụ commune
- Location within Vietnam
- Coordinates: 10°30′48″N 106°30′31″E
- Country: Vietnam
- Region: Mekong Delta
- Province: Tây Ninh
- Time zone: UTC+7 (UTC + 7)

Tân Trụ is a commune (xã) of Tây Ninh province, Vietnam.
