= Thiệu Hóa =

Thiệu Hóa Xã Thiệu Hóa
- Commune
- Thiệu Hóa commune
- Location within Vietnam
- Coordinates: 19°53′08″N 105°40′44″E
- Country: Vietnam
- Region: North Central Coast
- Province: Thanh Hóa
- Time zone: UTC+7 (UTC + 7)

Thiệu Hóa is a commune (xã) of Thanh Hóa Province, Vietnam.
