= An Dương district =

An Dương district Quận An Dương
- Urban district
- Interactive map of An Dương district
- Location of An Dương in Vietnam
- Coordinates: 20°51′49″N 106°36′50″E
- Country: Vietnam
- Municipality: Haiphong

Area
  - Total: 78.96 km^{2} (30.49 sq mi)

Population (2024)
  - Total: 171,227
  - Density: 2,169/km^{2} (5,616/sq mi)

An Dương is an urban district (quận) of Haiphong, the third largest city of Vietnam. It is located in the west of Hai Phong city. It separated from An Hải district in 2002, the urban district was established in 2025. An Dương's area is 78.96 km^{2} and its population is 171,227 people (in 2024). The district is adjacent to Hải Dương province in the west and northwest, An Lão district in the southwest, Kiến An district in the south, Thủy Nguyên city in the north and Hồng Bàng and Lê Chân districts in the southeast. It contains 10 wards, including An Đồng, An Hải, An Hòa, Đồng Thái, Hồng Phong, Hồng Thái, Lê Lợi, Lê Thiện, Nam Sơn, and Tân Tiến.

== Economy ==
- In 2003, the Prime Minister signed the decree to adjust the administrative boundaries of Hai Phong. As a result of that, some agricultural towns were added to An Dương district. After 10 years of re-establishment the average income of An Dương district reached $1,450. An Dương has a high speed of urbanization and industrialization compared to other places in Vietnam.
- This area is important in the industrial and agricultural services of Hai Phong. An Dương has various industrial districts such as Nomura industrial district, Bến Kiền industrial district, Hai Phong-Saigon industrial district (under construction) and Đặng Cương industrial district (under planning).
- An Dương's government has focused on accelerating the economic restructuring towards industrialization and modernization, creating conditions to attract investment for projects to promote the economy. The government has attempted to strengthen agricultural and rural industrialization, emphasising plants and animals with high quality in agricultural production, increasing economic efficiency in the area, and increasing the share of livestock to develop in a sustainable way. Rapid economic development has improved the quality of growth and sustainability, therefore maximising the potential and advantages to restructure the economy, especially in the service and construction fields, strengthening the economic restructuring towards comprehensive agricultural and commodity production, accelerating flowers, vegetables and plant projects in some localities and strengthening management of land use and promoting rural urbanization.

== Traffic ==
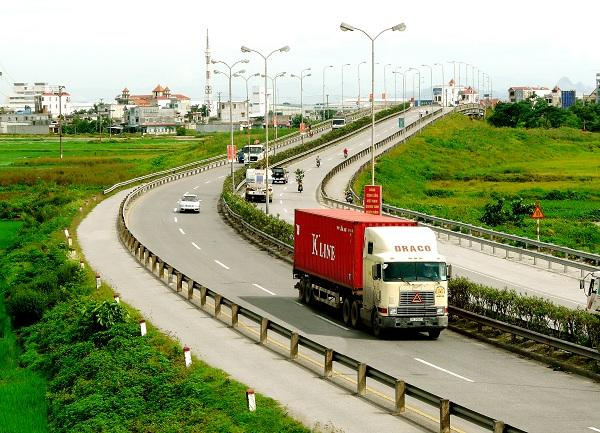
An Dương's traffic

- An Dương district has the two most important traffic routes which are highways 5A and 10. They play an important role in developing the economy. Other important highways include provincial highways 188 and 351. Together with highways 5A and 10, they help allow travel between the districts, allowing easier movement between them.

== History ==
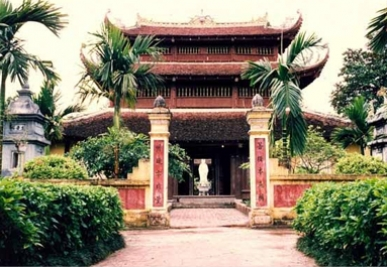
An Dương's temple

- An Dương contains some of the ancient architecture within Vietnam, containing many temples and pagodas, including Phúc Linh pagoda, Vân Tra temple, Vĩnh Khê temple, Tri Yếu temple and Nhu Thượng temple. These buildings preserves the ancient architecture, and festivals can be held there.

== Festivals ==
Two most famous festivals in An Dương are Vĩnh Khê temple and Vân Tra village festivals.

- Vĩnh Khê temple is located in Vĩnh Khê village, An Đồng commune. This festival occurs each year on 7 January to celebrate the birth of Vũ Trung and Vũ Giao, the two ingenious tactical generals in Trần Nghệ Tông's empire (1370–1372), to show respect for them. A wrestling contest takes place in the festival, and although it only lasts for one day, it attracts many people, which can result in the temple becoming very crowded. On the day before the contest, the elderly nominate two old men that satisfy these conditions: have good morals, rich, have children, no funeral, and clean clothes to become the examiners. The two men have to wear the same clothes.
- Vân Tra village is also located in An Đồng commune. The festival is annually on the 14th and 15th of January. Many activities occur such as cockfighting and chess, which attract both participants and viewers, although wrestling still attracts the most viewers. Wrestlers come from other provinces such as An Lão, Vĩnh Bảo and Tiên Lãng to fight each other. After that, in mid-February, Vân Tra village holds a festival to commemorate the merits of Dao Loi.
