= Sìn Hồ district =

Coordinates: 22.250°N 103.333°E

Sìn Hồ District Huyện Sìn Hồ
- District
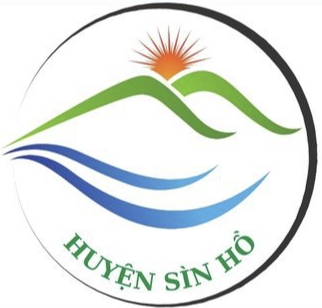
- Seal

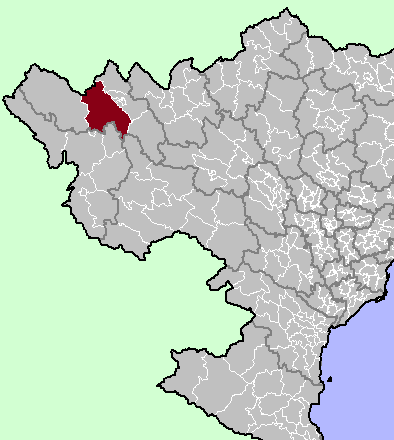
- District location in northern Vietnam
- Country: Vietnam
- Region: Northwest
- Province: Lai Châu
- Capital: Sìn Hồ

Area
  - Total: 1,526.96 km^{2} (589.56 sq mi)

Population (2019)
  - Total: 83,643
  - Density: 54.777/km^{2} (141.87/sq mi)
- Time zone: UTC+7 (Indochina Time)

Sìn Hồ is a former rural district of Lai Châu province in the Northwest region of Vietnam. There are various ethnic minorities of people such as the Mong and Dao.

As of 2019, the district had a population of 83,643. The district covers an area of 1,526.96 km^{2}. The district capital lies at Sìn Hồ.

The district is subdivided to 22 commune-level subdivisions, including Sìn Hồ township and the rural communes of Căn Co, Chăn Nưa, Hồng Thu, Làng Mô, Lùng Thàng, Ma Quai, Nậm Cha, Nậm Cuổi, Nậm Hăn, Nậm Mạ, Nậm Tăm, Noong Hẻo, Pa Khóa, Pa Tần, Phăng Sô Lin, Phìn Hồ, Pu Sam Cáp, Sà Dề Phìn, Tả Ngảo, Tả Phìn and Tủa Sín Chải.

== Climate ==
Climate data for Sìn Hồ, elevation 1,529 m (5,016 ft)
Month	Jan	Feb	Mar	Apr	May	Jun	Jul	Aug	Sep	Oct	Nov	Dec	Year
Record high °C (°F)	20.8 (69.4)	25.8 (78.4)	28.0 (82.4)	30.7 (87.3)	29.9 (85.8)	28.7 (83.7)	29.5 (85.1)	29.8 (85.6)	29.2 (84.6)	27.2 (81.0)	25.2 (77.4)	22.5 (72.5)	30.7 (87.3)
Mean daily maximum °C (°F)	14.8 (58.6)	17.3 (63.1)	20.8 (69.4)	23.0 (73.4)	23.6 (74.5)	23.4 (74.1)	23.3 (73.9)	23.7 (74.7)	22.9 (73.2)	20.7 (69.3)	17.8 (64.0)	15.0 (59.0)	20.5 (68.9)
Daily mean °C (°F)	10.2 (50.4)	12.3 (54.1)	15.5 (59.9)	18.0 (64.4)	19.4 (66.9)	20.0 (68.0)	20.0 (68.0)	19.9 (67.8)	18.8 (65.8)	16.5 (61.7)	13.1 (55.6)	10.2 (50.4)	16.2 (61.2)
Mean daily minimum °C (°F)	6.9 (44.4)	8.6 (47.5)	11.3 (52.3)	14.2 (57.6)	16.6 (61.9)	18.0 (64.4)	18.0 (64.4)	17.6 (63.7)	16.1 (61.0)	13.8 (56.8)	10.1 (50.2)	6.9 (44.4)	13.2 (55.8)
Record low °C (°F)	−6.0 (21.2)	−0.4 (31.3)	−1.0 (30.2)	4.3 (39.7)	8.4 (47.1)	11.0 (51.8)	12.9 (55.2)	12.4 (54.3)	8.9 (48.0)	2.1 (35.8)	−1.0 (30.2)	−4.2 (24.4)	−6.0 (21.2)
Average rainfall mm (inches)	44.5 (1.75)	42.1 (1.66)	76.6 (3.02)	186.9 (7.36)	320.0 (12.60)	501.9 (19.76)	602.6 (23.72)	450.4 (17.73)	247.6 (9.75)	141.6 (5.57)	80.5 (3.17)	44.1 (1.74)	2,738.7 (107.82)
Average rainy days	8.1	8.2	8.8	14.5	21.1	26.0	26.9	24.6	18.4	13.4	9.3	6.8	186.0
Average relative humidity (%)	84.9	79.7	74.5	77.8	83.4	87.8	89.1	88.7	87.5	87.6	87.8	87.0	84.6
Mean monthly sunshine hours	157.5	168.3	198.7	205.2	182.0	108.1	109.9	133.5	143.0	136.8	145.0	149.7	1,840.6
Source: Vietnam Institute for Building Science and Technology
