= Lai Châu (city) =

- Provincial city (Class-3)
- Lai Châu City; Thành phố Lai Châu
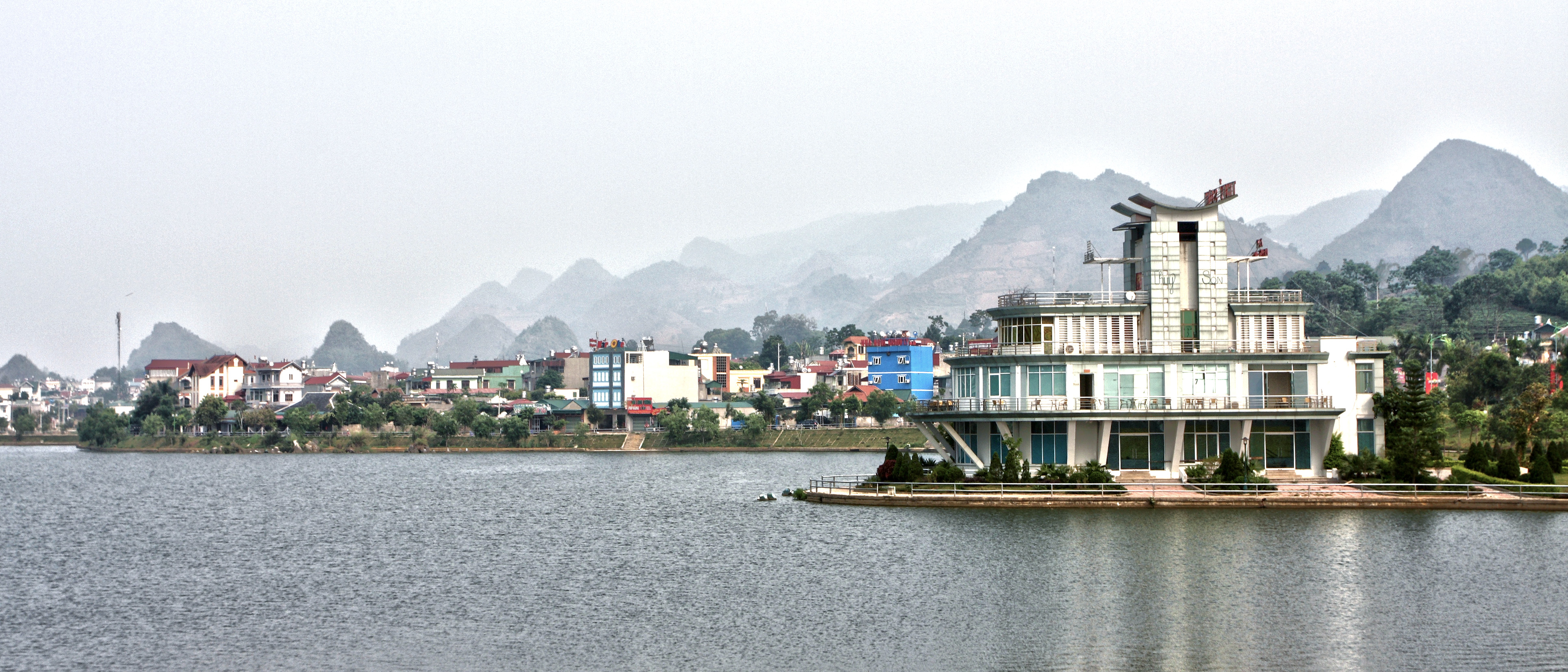
- Lai Châu City Lake
- Interactive map of Lai Châu
- Location in Vietnam
- Coordinates: 22°23′57″N 103°26′21″E
- Country: Vietnam
- Province: Lai Châu
- Established town: 10 October 2004
- Established city: 27 December 2013

Area
  - Total: 92.37 km^{2} (35.66 sq mi)

Population (2020)
  - Total: 42,973
  - Density: 465.2/km^{2} (1,205/sq mi)
- Time zone: UTC+7 (Indochina Time)
- Climate: Cwa
- Website: thanhpho.laichau.gov.vn

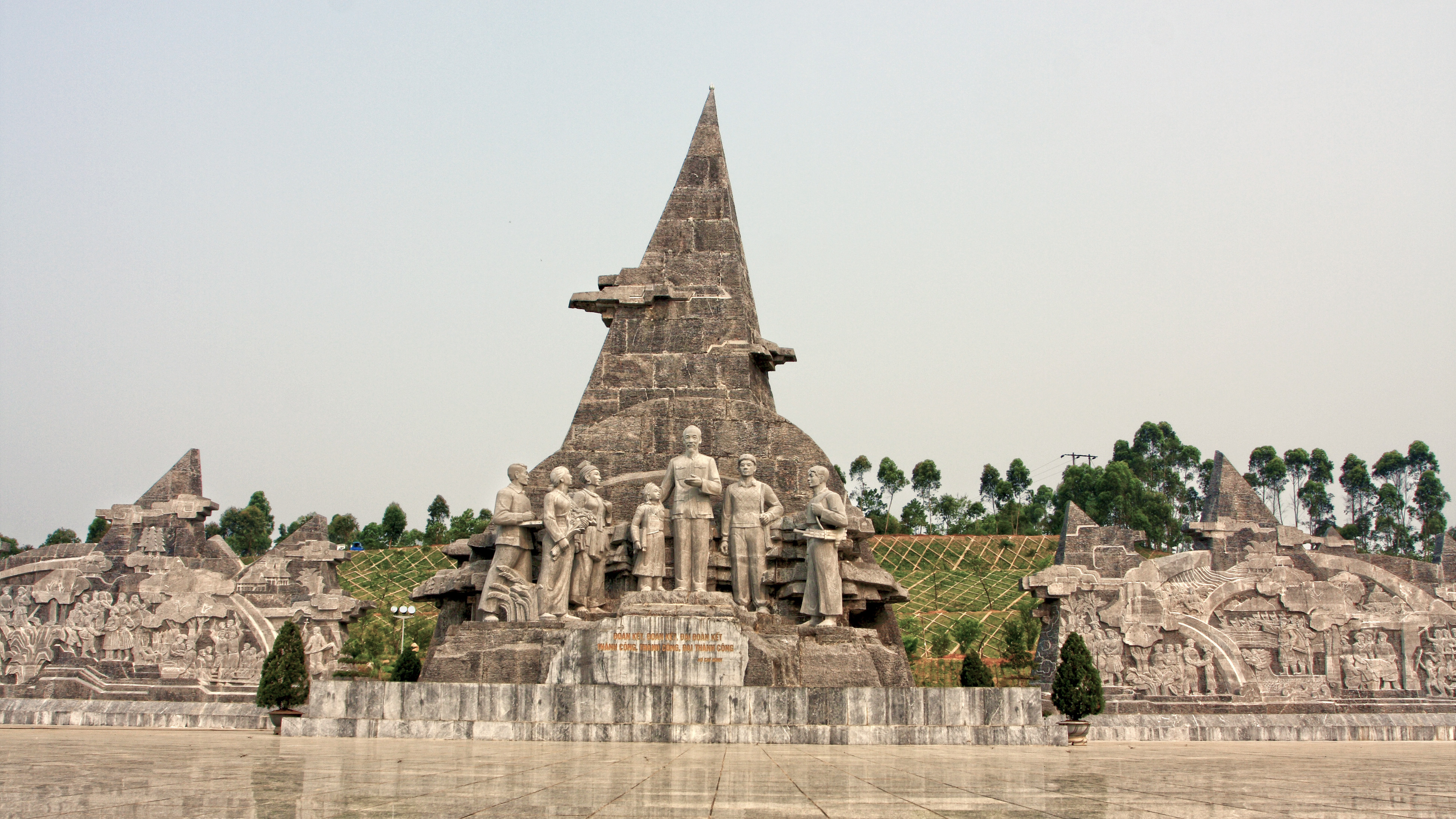
Lai Châu Town Square Monument, as seen in April 2014.

Lai Châu is a former city in the Northwest region of Vietnam. It is the capital city of Lai Châu Province. The city borders Phong Thổ District, Sìn Hồ District and Tam Đường District.

== History ==
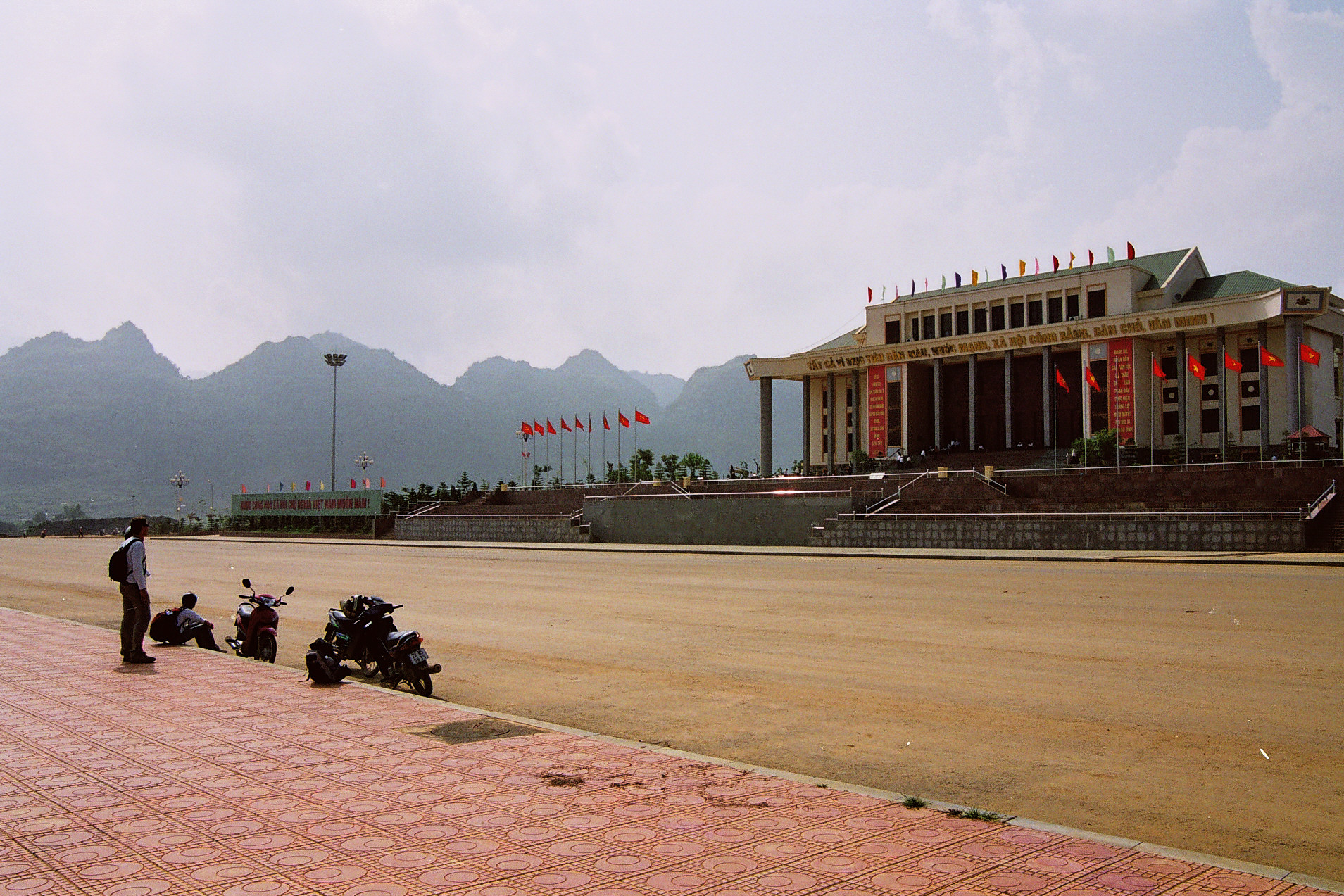
Lai Châu town square in 2006

Lai Châu, or Muang Lay (Vietnamese: Mường Lay) was the seat of lords of the White Tai who were dominant over other Thai peoples of the area, though there was rivalry between the White Tai rulers of Muang Lay and Muang So. During the 1870s Muang Lay was the base of lord Đèo Văn Trị of the White Tai who sought to unite and become chief of the 12 mường (Sino-Vietnamese: Châu / 州) making up the Sip Song Chau Tai. This he partially achieved, with the help first of the Chinese Black Flags, then later the French. His authority, and the autonomy of the area, was recognised by the French in 1890.

== Demographics ==
As of 2020 the city had a population of 42,973, covering an area of 92.37 km^{2}.

== Administrative divisions ==
Lai Châu City is officially divided into 7 commune-level sub-divisions, including 5 wards (Đoàn Kết, Đông Phong, Quyết Thắng, Quyết Tiến, Tân Phong) and 2 rural communes (San Thàng, Sùng Phài).

== Climate ==
Lai Châu has a humid subtropical climate (Köppen Cwa), typical for northwestern Vietnam, with hot, oppressively humid, and wet summers and warm to very warm, dry winters.

Climate data for Tam Đường station, Lai Châu, elevation 900 m (3,000 ft)
Month	Jan	Feb	Mar	Apr	May	Jun	Jul	Aug	Sep	Oct	Nov	Dec	Year
Record high °C (°F)	28.7 (83.7)	31.2 (88.2)	34.0 (93.2)	34.7 (94.5)	34.5 (94.1)	32.4 (90.3)	32.7 (90.9)	33.4 (92.1)	32.2 (90.0)	31.0 (87.8)	29.5 (85.1)	28.0 (82.4)	34.7 (94.5)
Mean daily maximum °C (°F)	18.8 (65.8)	21.0 (69.8)	24.4 (75.9)	27.0 (80.6)	27.5 (81.5)	27.0 (80.6)	26.8 (80.2)	27.5 (81.5)	27.0 (80.6)	25.1 (77.2)	22.1 (71.8)	19.3 (66.7)	24.5 (76.0)
Daily mean °C (°F)	13.6 (56.5)	15.4 (59.7)	18.7 (65.7)	21.4 (70.5)	22.7 (72.9)	23.1 (73.6)	22.9 (73.2)	23.1 (73.6)	22.2 (72.0)	20.2 (68.4)	16.9 (62.4)	13.9 (57.0)	19.5 (67.1)
Mean daily minimum °C (°F)	10.1 (50.2)	11.4 (52.5)	14.3 (57.7)	17.2 (63.0)	19.3 (66.7)	20.7 (69.3)	20.6 (69.1)	20.4 (68.7)	19.2 (66.6)	17.0 (62.6)	13.5 (56.3)	10.3 (50.5)	16.2 (61.2)
Record low °C (°F)	0.8 (33.4)	3.2 (37.8)	2.9 (37.2)	7.9 (46.2)	11.9 (53.4)	15.0 (59.0)	16.9 (62.4)	17.0 (62.6)	12.7 (54.9)	7.2 (45.0)	4.0 (39.2)	−0.4 (31.3)	−0.4 (31.3)
Average rainfall mm (inches)	40.1 (1.58)	39.0 (1.54)	81.2 (3.20)	185.1 (7.29)	340.4 (13.40)	472.5 (18.60)	545.2 (21.46)	340.0 (13.39)	186.2 (7.33)	131.9 (5.19)	75.3 (2.96)	35.1 (1.38)	2,469 (97.20)
Average rainy days	7.2	7.0	8.4	14.0	21.9	25.2	26.3	23.0	16.3	12.5	8.2	5.1	175.0
Average relative humidity (%)	81.2	77.0	73.0	75.9	81.3	87.2	89.0	87.6	86.0	84.3	82.3	81.7	82.2
Mean monthly sunshine hours	161.5	167.0	189.3	204.3	186.4	114.5	117.2	145.2	157.6	156.4	164.1	168.0	1,936.8
Source: Vietnam Institute for Building Science and Technology
