= Can Lộc district =

Coordinates: 18.471°N 105.765°E

Can Lộc District Huyện Can Lộc
- District
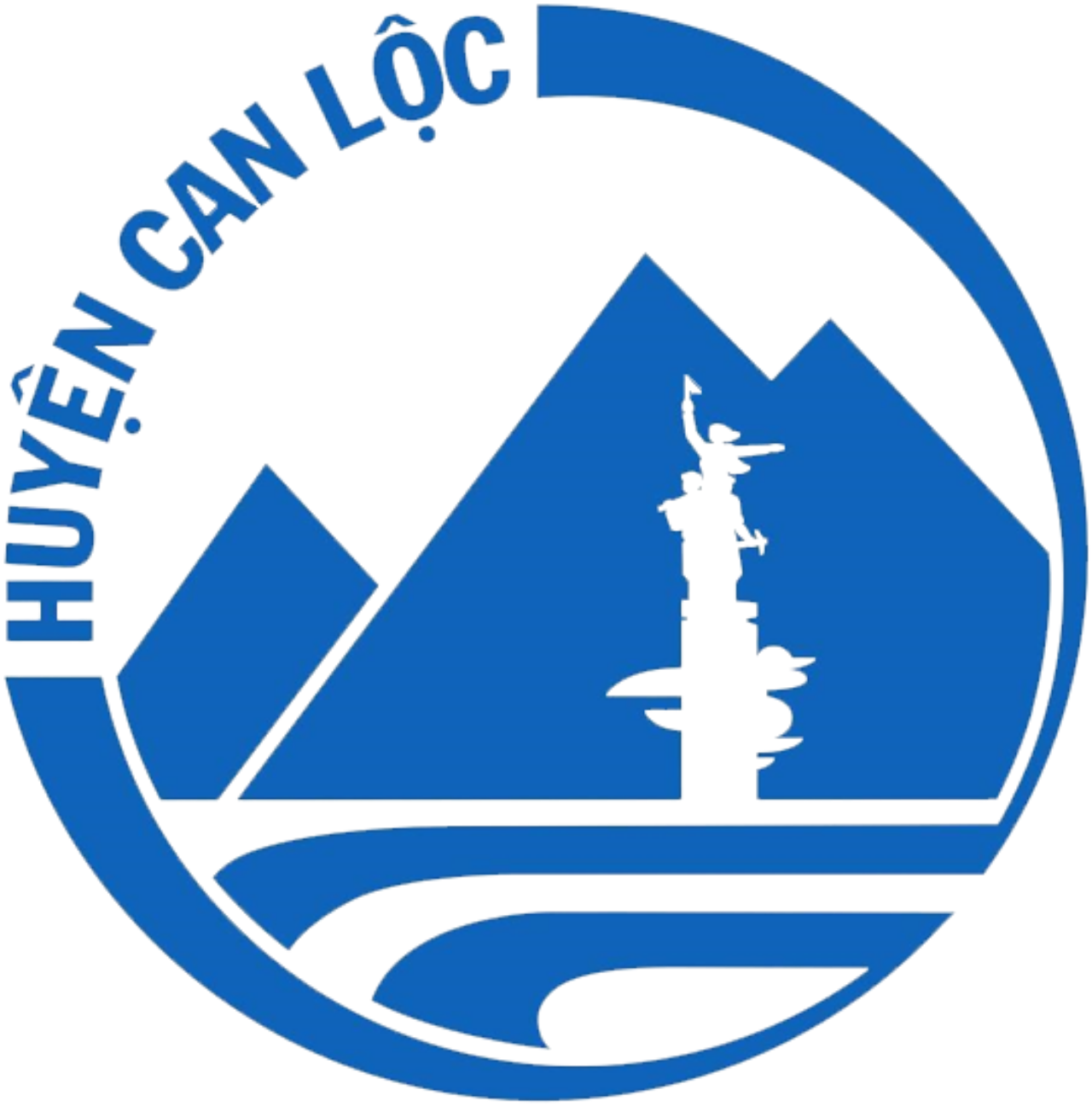
- Seal
- Interactive map of Can Lộc District
- Country: Vietnam
- Region: North Central Coast
- Province: Hà Tĩnh
- Capital: Nghèn

Area
  - Total: 146 sq mi (378 km^{2})

Population (2003)
  - Total: 180,931
- Time zone: UTC+07:00 (Indochina Time)

Can Lộc is a former rural district of Hà Tĩnh province in the North Central Coast region of Vietnam. As of 2003 the district had a population of 180,931. The district covers an area of 378 km^{2} (146 sq mi). The district capital lies at Nghèn.
