= Thạnh Hóa =

Thạnh Hóa Xã Thạnh Hóa
- Commune
- Thạnh Hóa commune
- Location within Vietnam
- Coordinates: 10°39′19″N 106°10′56″E
- Country: Vietnam
- Region: Mekong Delta
- Province: Tây Ninh
- Time zone: UTC+7 (UTC + 7)

Thạnh Hóa is a commune (xã) of Tây Ninh Province, Vietnam.
