= Sìn Hồ =

Sìn Hồ Xã Sìn Hồ
- Commune
- Sìn Hồ commune
- Location within Vietnam
- Coordinates: 22°21′33″N 103°15′02″E
- Country: Vietnam
- Region: Northwest
- Province: Lai Châu
- Time zone: UTC+7 (UTC + 7)

Sìn Hồ is a commune (xã) of Lai Châu Province, Vietnam.
