= Ia H'Drai district =

Coordinates: 14°06′14″N 107°27′17″E

- District
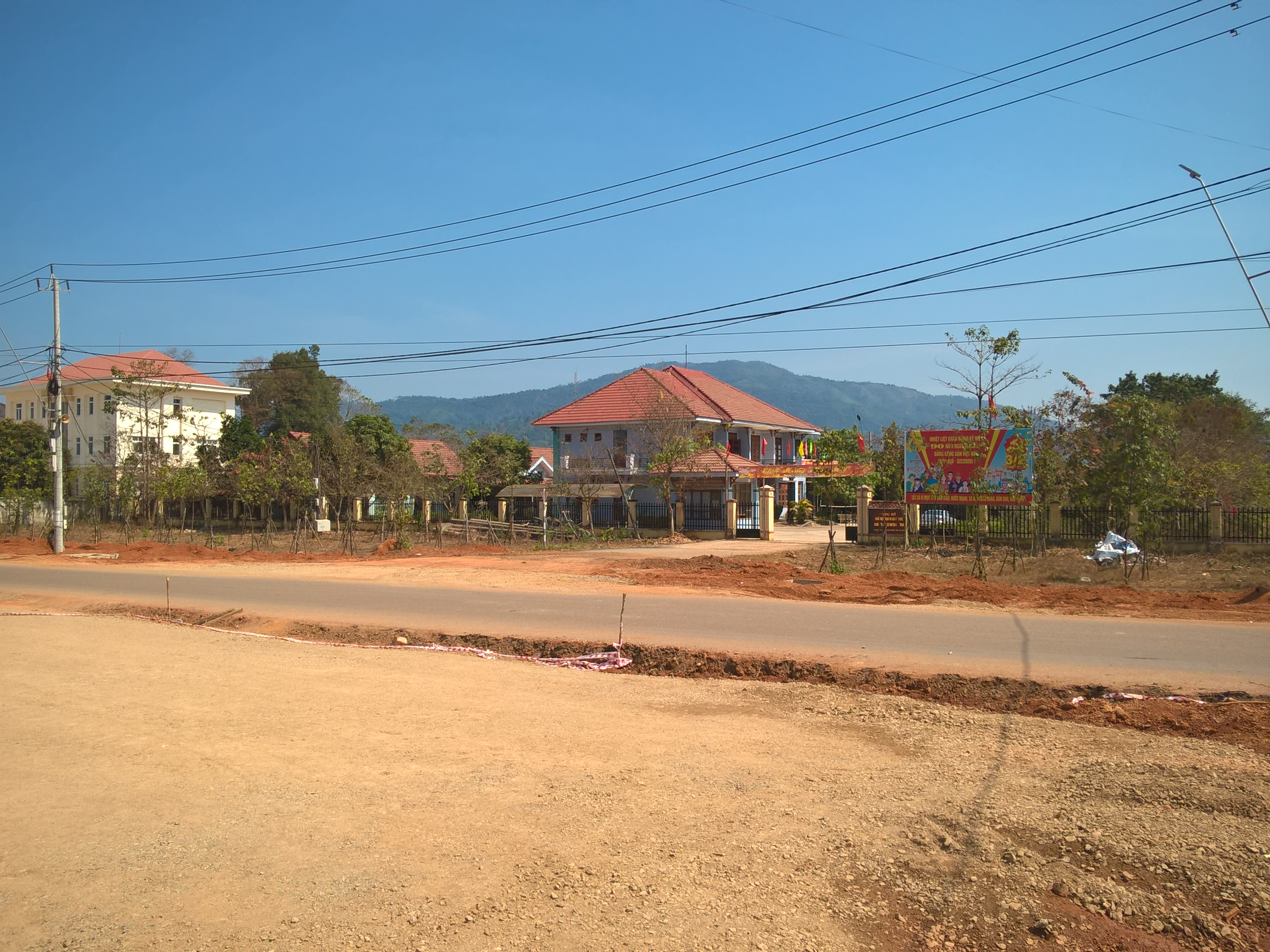
- Roadside houses in Ia H'Drai
- Interactive map of Ia H'Drai district
- Country: Vietnam
- Province: Kon Tum

Area
  - Total: 1,565 km^{2} (604 sq mi)

Population (2019 census)
  - Total: 10,210
  - Density: 6.524/km^{2} (16.90/sq mi)

Ia H'Drai is a district in Kon Tum province, Vietnam. As of 2019, the district had a population of 10,210. The area spans 1,565 km².
