= Xuân Trường, Ninh Bình =

Coordinates: 21°03′N 105°17′E

Xã Xuân Trường
- Interactive map of Xã Xuân Trường
- Country: Vietnam
- Region: Red River Delta
- Province: Ninh Bình Province

Area
  - Total: 6.16 km^{2} (2.38 sq mi)

Population (2003)
  - Total: 11,506
  - Density: 1,868/km^{2} (4,840/sq mi)
- Time zone: UTC+7 (Indochina Time)

Xuân Trường (xã) is a commune of Ninh Bình Province in Vietnam. It borders the province of Thái Bình Province in the north, Hải Hậu District in the south, Giao Thủy District in the east, and Trực Ninh District in the west. Xuân Trường is surrounded by three rivers, the Red River, Ninh Cơ River, and So River. Provincial Road no. 489 runs through it.
