= Kỳ Anh (town) =

Coordinates: 18°4′4″N 106°17′48″E

- District-level town (Class-4)
- Kỳ Anh Town; Thị xã Kỳ Anh
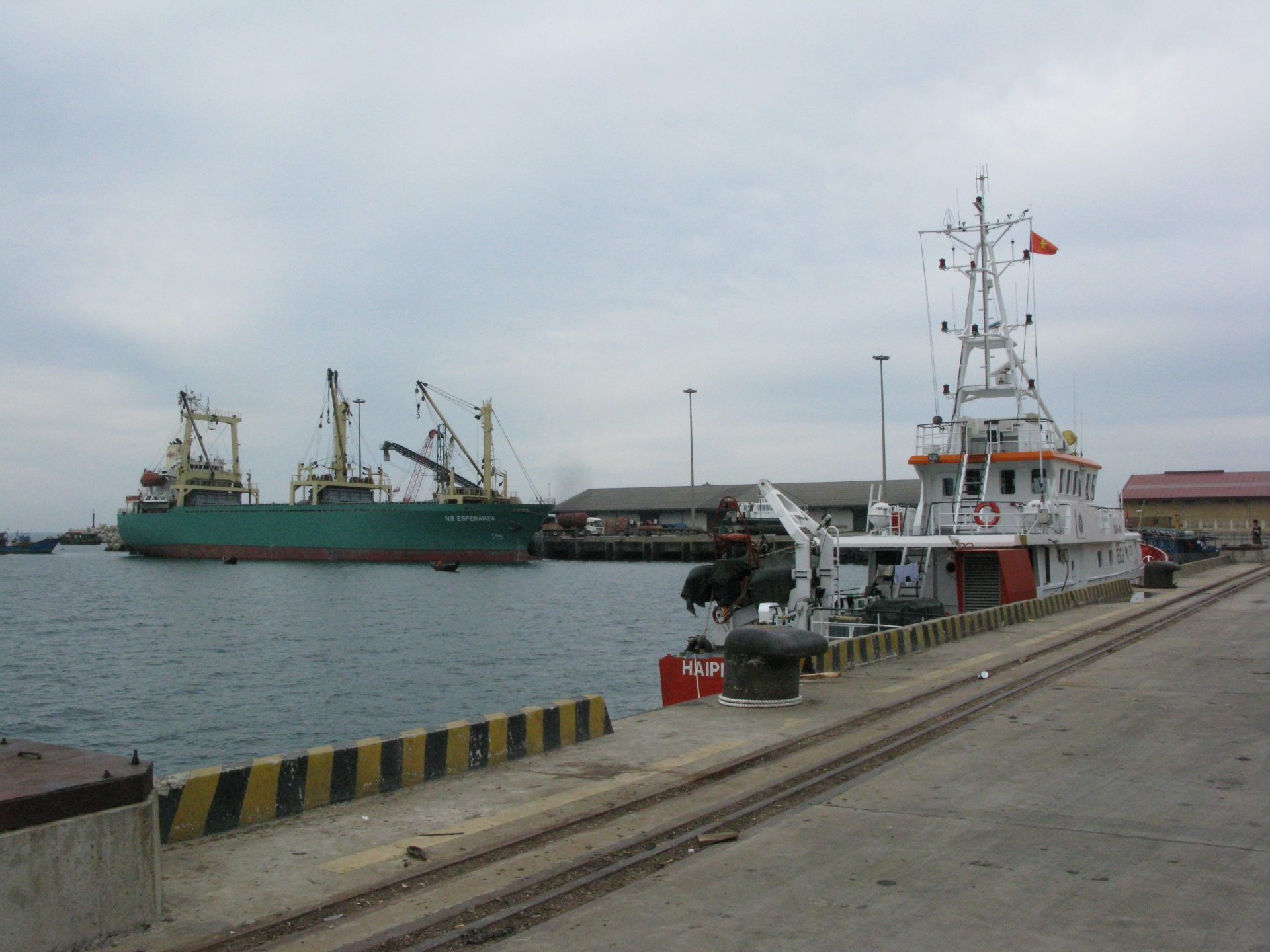
- Vũng Áng port

- Seal
- Interactive map of Kỳ Anh
- Location within Vietnam
- Country: Vietnam
- Region: North Central Coast
- Province: Hà Tĩnh
- Capital: Kỳ Anh

Area
  - Total: 294.062 sq mi (761.617 km^{2})

Population (2015)
  - Total: 120,518
  - Density: 420/sq mi (161/km^{2})
- Time zone: UTC+07:00 (Indochina Time)

Kỳ Anh is a town of Hà Tĩnh Province in the North Central Coast region of Vietnam. The town split from Kỳ Anh District on 10 April 2015.
