= Sốp Cộp =

Sốp Cộp Xã Sốp Cộp
- Rural commune
- Sốp Cộp commune
- Location within Vietnam
- Coordinates: 20°56′30″N 103°36′01″E
- Country: Vietnam
- Region: Northwest
- Province: Sơn La
- Time zone: UTC+7 (UTC + 7)

Sốp Cộp is a rural commune (xã) of Sơn La Province, Vietnam.
