= Mậu A =

- Commune
- Location within Vietnam
- Coordinates: 21°52′41″N 104°41′44″E
- Country: Vietnam
- Region: Northeast
- Province: Lào Cai

Area
  - Total: 3.13 sq mi (8.11 km^{2})

Population
  - Total: 9,942
- Time zone: UTC+7 (UTC + 7)

Mậu A is a commune of Lào Cai Province, in the northeastern region of Vietnam.
