= Hồng Bàng district =

Hồng Bàng district Quận Hồng Bàng
- Urban district
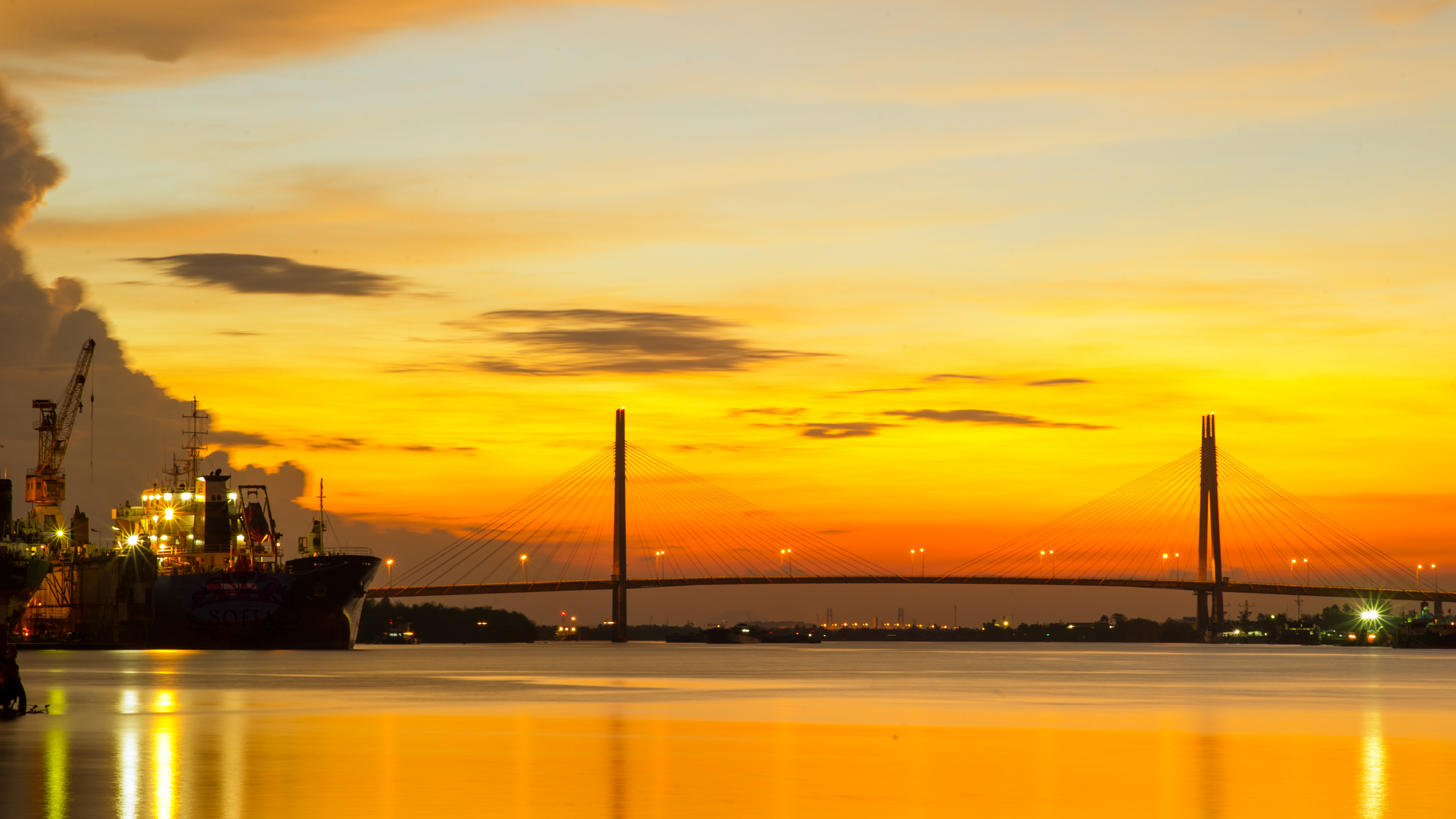
- Interactive map of Hồng Bàng district
- Location within Vietnam
- Coordinates: 20°51′43″N 106°39′44″E
- Country: Vietnam
- Municipality: Haiphong
- Regions: Red River Delta
- Founded: 1961
- Subdivision: 10 wards

Government
  - Chairman of the People's Committee: Phạm Văn Đoan
  - Chairman of the People's Council: Đỗ Việt Hưng
  - Secretary: Lê Ngọc Trữ

Area
  - Total: 39.77 km^{2} (15.36 sq mi)

Population (2025)
  - Total: 177,820
  - Density: 4,471/km^{2} (11,580/sq mi)
- Website: hongbang.haiphong.gov.vn

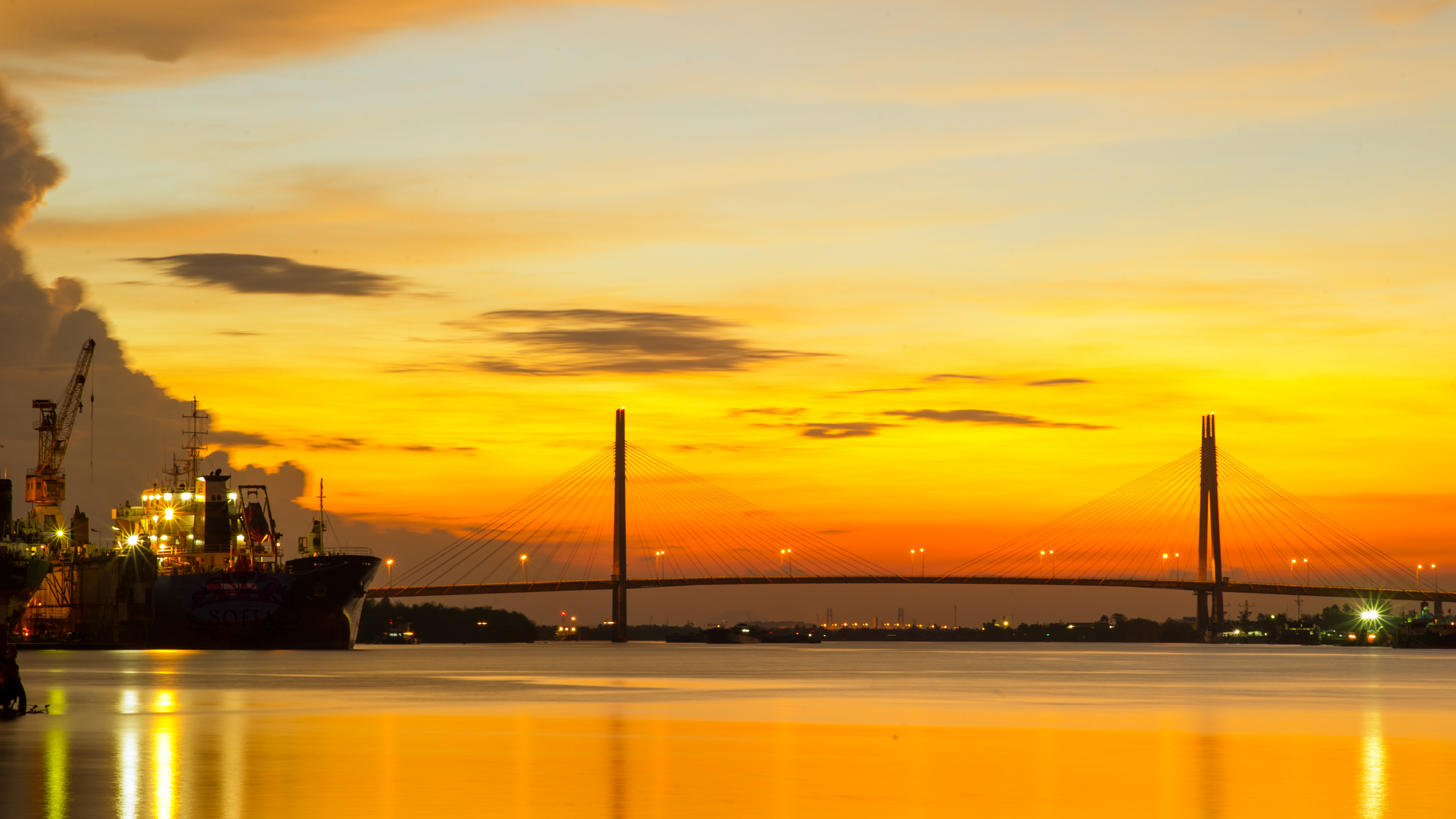

Hồng Bàng (Vietnamese: Quận Hồng Bàng) is a district (quận) of Haiphong, the third-largest city of Vietnam.

== Administrative divisions ==
Hồng Bàng district is subdivided into 10 wards: An Hồng, An Hưng, Đại Bản, Hoàng Văn Thụ, Hùng Vương, Minh Khai, Phan Bội Châu, Quán Toan, Sở Dầu, Thượng Lý.
