= Châu Thành district, Hậu Giang =

Coordinates: 9°55′22″N 105°48′37″E

Châu Thành district Huyện Châu Thành
- District
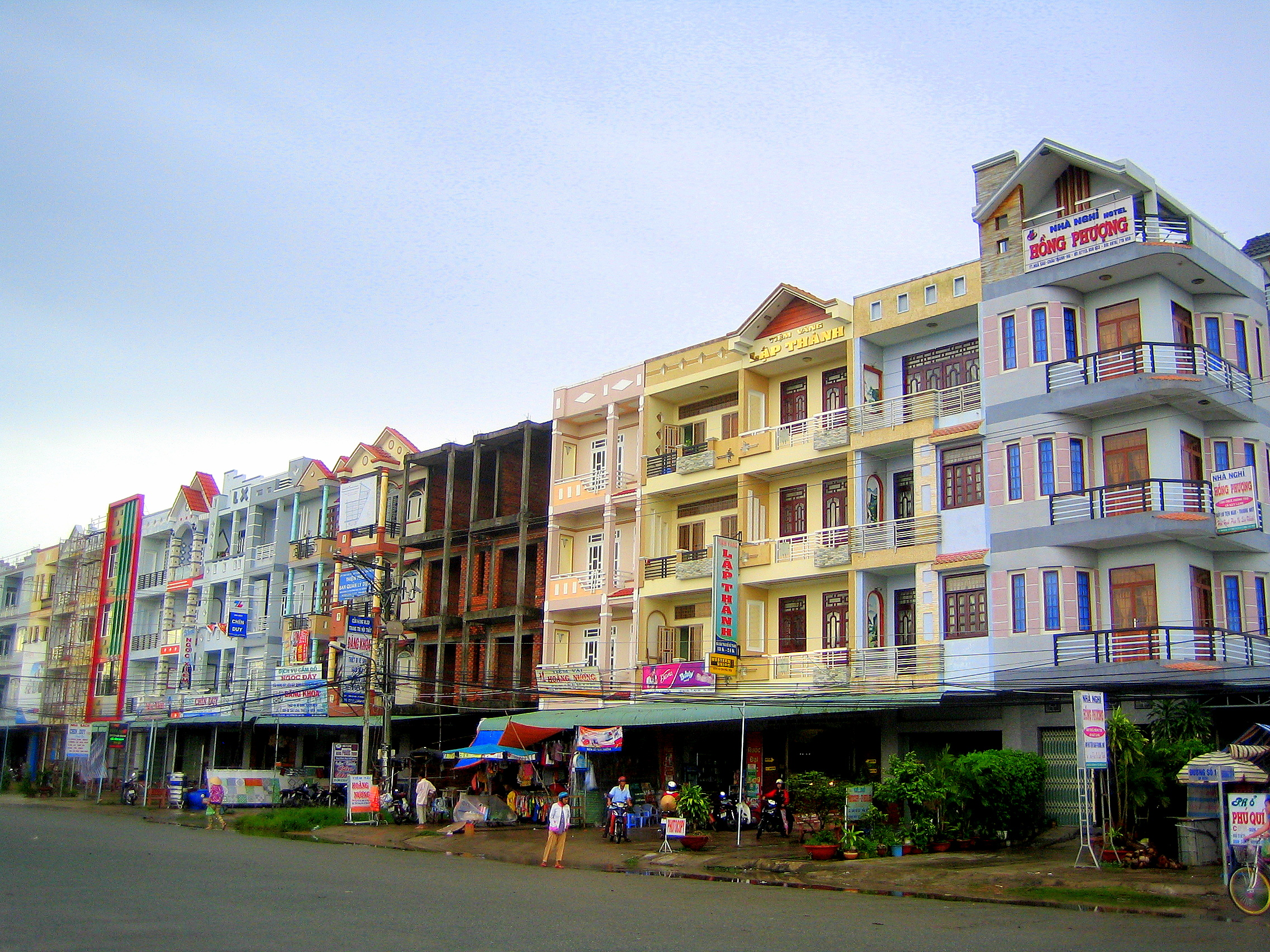
- Ngã Sáu town commercial area
- Interactive map of Châu Thành district
- Country: Vietnam
- Region: Mekong Delta
- Province: Hau Giang
- Founded: 1913

Area
  - District: 51.9 sq mi (134.5 km^{2})

Population (2023)
  - District: 98.079
  - Density: 1,800/sq mi (700/km^{2})
  - Urban: 33.764
- Time zone: UTC+7 (Indochina Time)
- Website: chauthanh.haugiang.gov.vn

Châu Thành is a former rural district (huyện) of Hậu Giang province in the Mekong Delta region of Vietnam.

== Divisions ==
The district is divided into 2 towns, Ngã Sáu and Mái Dầm, and 6 communes: Đông Phú, Đông Phước, Đông Phước A, Đông Thạnh, Phú Hữu and Phú Tân.
