= Dương Kinh district =

Coordinates: 20°47′04″N 106°42′49″E

Dương Kinh is an urban district (quận) of Haiphong, the third largest city of Vietnam.

== History ==
Dương Kinh was established on September 12, 2007, on the basis of separating 6 communes: Anh Dũng, Hưng Đạo, Đa Phúc, Hòa Nghĩa, Hải Thành, Tân Thành of Kiến Thụy district.
