= Ia Grai district =

Coordinates: 14.000°N 107.750°E

Ia Grai district Huyện Ia Grai
- District
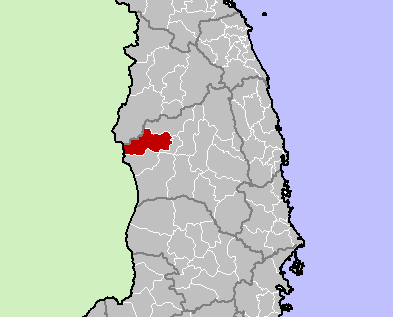
- Location in Gia Lai province
- Country: Vietnam
- Region: Central Highlands
- Province: Gia Lai province
- Capital: Ia Kha

Area
  - Total: 446.75 sq mi (1,157.07 km^{2})

Population (31/12/2024)
  - Total: 111,099
  - Density: 248.684/sq mi (96.0175/km^{2})
- Time zone: UTC+7 (Indochina Time)

Ia Grai (Bahnar language: Yă-grai) is a former rural district (huyện) of Gia Lai province in the Central Highlands region of Vietnam. As of 2024 the district had a population of 111,099. The district covers an area of 1,157.07 km². The district capital lies at Ia Kha.

== Divisions ==
The district contains the urban commune, Ia Kha, which is the seat, and the communes of Ia Chia, Ia Dêr, Ia Hrung, Ia Bá, Ia Krai, Ia O, Ia Pếch, Ia Sao, Ia Tô, Ia Yok, Ia Grăng and Ia Khai.
