= Tân Yên, Bắc Ninh =

Tân Yên
- Commune
- Location in Vietnam
- Coordinates: 21°23′4″N 106°7′34″E
- Country: Vietnam
- City: Bắc Ninh
- Established: 16/06/2025

Area
  - Total: 18.58 sq mi (48.13 km^{2})

Population (December 31 2024)
  - Total: 50,732
  - Density: 2,730/sq mi (1,054/km^{2})
- Time zone: UTC+07:00

Tân Yên is a commune (xã) of Bắc Ninh, in north-eastern Vietnam.
