= An Lão district, Haiphong =

Coordinates: 20.821335°N 106.556477°E

An Lão is a rural district (huyện) of Hai Phong, the third largest city in Vietnam.

As of 2003 the district had a population of 124,592. The district covers an area of 114 km^{2} (44 sq mi). The district capital lies at An Lão.
