= Ngô Quyền district =

Ngô Quyền district Quận Ngô Quyền
- Urban district
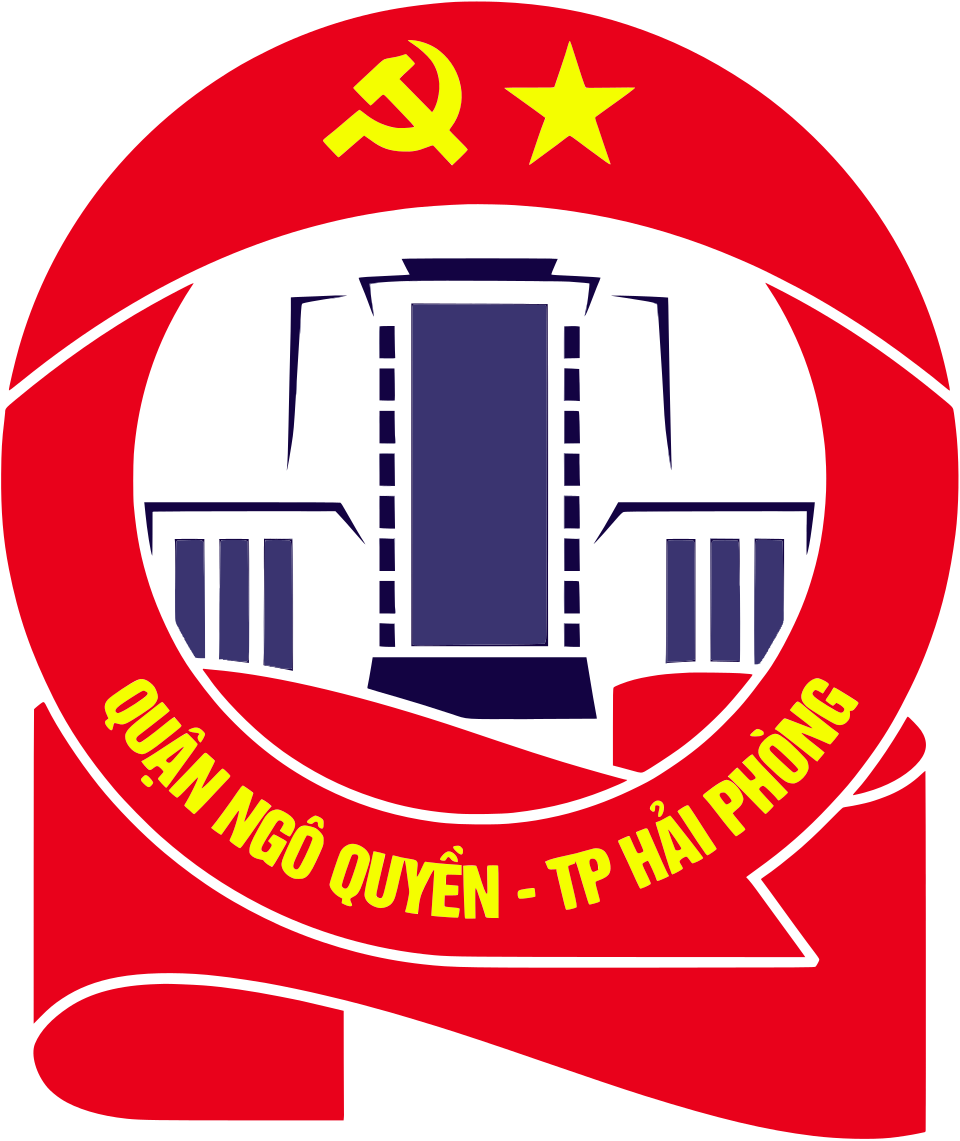
- Seal
- Interactive map of Ngô Quyền district
- Location within Vietnam
- Coordinates: 20°51′41″N 106°41′45″E
- Country: Vietnam
- Municipality: Haiphong

Area
  - Total: 10.97 km^{2} (4.24 sq mi)

Population (2019)
  - Total: 165,309
  - Density: 15,070/km^{2} (39,030/sq mi)

Ngô Quyền is an urban district (quận) of Hai Phong, the third largest city of Vietnam. It is named after King Ngô Quyền who defeated the Chinese at the famous Battle of Bạch Đằng River north of modern Haiphong and ended 1,000 years of Chinese domination dating back to 111 BC under the Han dynasty.

== Geography ==
Ngo Quyen District is centrally located within Hai Phong City, with the following geographical boundaries:

- To the east, it borders Hai An District.
- To the west, it borders Hong Bang and Le Chan Districts.
- To the south, it borders Duong Kinh District, separated by the Lach Tray River.
- To the north, it borders Thuy Nguyen City, with the Cam River serving as the boundary.

Ngo Quyen District covers an area of 11 km² and, as of December 31, 2022, has a population of 186,683, with a population density of 16,477 people per km².

The district runs along the Cam River, encompassing nearly all of the city's main port area. It serves as a transportation hub connecting Hai Phong to other provinces in Vietnam and the world through its extensive seaport and river systems, handling over 10 million tons of cargo annually. Additionally, it includes the airport, train station, and National Highway 5, making the seaport system a key driver of Hai Phong's and Ngo Quyen's economic structure.

=== Topography ===
Ngo Quyen District has relatively flat terrain.

=== Hydrology ===
The Cam River runs along the district's northern boundary, separating it from Thuy Nguyen City, while the Lach Tray River flows along the southern boundary, dividing it from Duong Kinh District. The district also has several large lakes, including An Bien Lake (located between Lach Tray and Le Quang Dao streets), Quan Ngua Lake (surrounding the Youth Culture and Sports Center), Tien Nga Lake, and part of Phuong Luu Lake (shared with Hai An District). Many ponds and swamps have been filled in over time due to urbanization.

== Administration ==
Ngo Quyen District consists of 12 administrative sub-units, all of which are wards: Cau Dat, Cau Tre, Dang Giang, Dong Khe, Dong Quoc Binh, Gia Vien, Lac Vien, Lach Tray, Le Loi, May Chai, May To, and Van My.

== History ==
Ngo Quyen District was originally Ngo Quyen quarter, part of Hai Phong City.

On July 5, 1961, the Government Council issued Decision No. 92-CP to establish Ngo Quyen quarter based on the former Gia Lac Vien quarter, including subdivisions such as Doan Ket, Thong Nhat, Dan Chu, Hoa Binh, Nguyen Khuyen, Pham Ngu Lao, To Hieu, Tran Nhat Duat, Tran Phu I, and parts of Tran Phu II from the former Cau Dat quarter; and subdivisions like Nha Hat Nhan Dan, Dai Phat Tin, Dong An Phung, Tam Gian, Rap Hat, Chu Van An, and Quan Ngua from the former Hang Kenh quarter.

Ngo Quyen quarter covered an area of 4.1 km^{2} (1.6 sq mi) with a population of about 60,000 and included 40 subdivisions.

On January 3, 1981, the Government Council issued Decision No. 3-CP, renaming Ngo Quyen quarter as Ngo Quyen District.

On January 15, 1981, Hai Phong City’s People's Committee issued Decision No. 83/QD-UBND, renaming Ngo Quyen quarter as Ngo Quyen District and establishing 12 wards: Cat Bi, Cau Dat, Cau Tre, Dong Quoc Binh, Gia Vien, Lac Vien, Lach Tray, Le Loi, Luong Khanh Thien, May Chai, May To, and Van My.

On February 17, 1987, the Council of Ministers issued Decision No. 38-HDBT, transferring Dang Giang and Dong Khe Communes from An Hai District to Ngo Quyen District and designating them as corresponding wards.

Ngo Quyen District then spanned 1,509 hectares with a population of 133,409, comprising 14 wards: Cat Bi, Cau Dat, Cau Tre, Dang Giang, Dong Khe, Dong Quoc Binh, Gia Vien, Lac Vien, Lach Tray, Le Loi, Luong Khanh Thien, May Chai, May To, and Van My.

On December 20, 2002, the Government issued Decree No. 106/2002/ND-CP, transferring Cat Bi Ward to the newly established Hai An District.

Ngo Quyen District was then left with a natural area of 1,096.78 hectares, a population of 155,253, and 13 administrative sub-units, comprising 13 wards: Cau Dat, Cau Tre, Dang Giang, Dong Khe, Dong Quoc Binh, Gia Vien, Lach Tray, Lac Vien, Le Loi, Luong Khanh Thien, May Chai, May To, and Van My.

On January 10, 2020, the Standing Committee of the National Assembly issued Resolution No. 872/NQ-UBTVQH14 (effective from February 1, 2020), merging Luong Khanh Thien Ward into Cau Dat Ward.

Since then, Ngo Quyen District has consisted of the current 12 wards.

== Socio-Economics ==
Ngo Quyen District holds significant political, socio-economic, and security importance in Hai Phong. It is also home to key municipal offices, agencies, and departments of the city government.

=== Industry ===
The district hosts several major industrial facilities, both at the central and local levels:

- Ha Long Canned Food Corporation
- Hai Phong Glass Company
- Enamel-Coated Aluminum Plant and Chemical Company
- Tien Phong Plastic Company
- Hai Phong Paint Company
- Hai Phong Brewery Company

=== Education ===
Universities and Research Institutes:

- Hai Phong University (B, C, D campuses)
- Hai Phong University of Medicine and Pharmacy
- To Hieu Political School
- Institute of Marine Resources and Environment
- Research Institute of Marine Products

High Schools:

- Thai Phien High School
- Einstein High School
- Maritime High School
- Thang Long High School

== Culture ==
Parks and Gardens:

- Nguyen Trai Flower Garden
- Central flower garden strip, including To Huu, Kim Dong, Nguyen Du, Nguyen Binh Khiem, and Nguyen Van Troi Gardens (shared with Hong Bang District), located across the May To and Cau Dat wards.
- Lach Tray Park, located in Lach Tray Ward.
- Future plans include a scenic park strip along the Cam River, located within May To and May Chai wards.

=== Cultural Facilities ===
- Vietnam-Tiep Friendship Cultural Center
- Youth Cultural Center
- Lach Tray Stadium

== Transportation ==
=== Rail ===
Hai Phong Station, the main railway station in Hai Phong, is located in Ngo Quyen District. It serves as the final passenger station on the Hanoi–Hai Phong railway line and also supports a freight railway line that transports goods from the port to inland regions.

=== Ports ===
The district's ports are primarily inland river ports within the Hai Phong port system. According to planning, these ports will eventually be relocated to the Dinh Vu Port Complex and Lach Huyen International Port, making way for new bridges and scenic parks along the Cam River.

- Hoang Dieu Port (also known as Sau Kho Terminal): a domestic container port, handling bulk goods for domestic service. It has 11 berths, with a depth of -8.4 meters in front of the quay, a warehouse system covering 31,320 square meters, and a yard area of 163,000 square meters. Recently, parts of the port, specifically areas 8 and 9, were relocated to make way for the Hoang Van Thu Bridge.
- Cua Cam Port
- Doan Xa Port
- Fisheries Port

=== Bridges ===
- Hoang Van Thu Bridge (connecting May To Ward with Tan Duong Commune, Thuy Nguyen District)
- Rao Bridge (connecting Dang Giang Ward with Anh Dung Ward, Duong Kinh District). Future bridge projects, such as Nguyen Trai Bridge (connecting to Duong Quan Commune, Thuy Nguyen District, with construction starting in 2023) and Vu Yen Bridge (connecting to Vu Yen Island, Thuy Duong Commune, Thuy Nguyen District), will enhance connectivity between the district and other local areas.
