= Kiến Thụy district =

Coordinates: 20.750°N 106.667°E

Kiến Thụy district Huyện Kiến Thụy Nghi Dương huyện
- Rural District
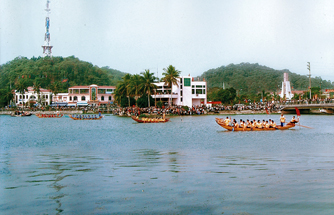
- Festival of the dragon boat racing on the Đa Độ River on June 15, 2010.
- Nickname: "Antland" (Kiến Huyện)
- Interactive map of Kiến Thụy district
- Country: Vietnam
- Region: Red River Delta
- Municipality (Class-I): Hải Phòng
- Establishment: 1469
- Central hall: No.8, Cẩm Xuân road, Provincial Route 402, Núi Đối township

Government
  - Type: Rural district
  - People Committee's Chairman: Lưu Văn Thụy
  - People Council's Chairman: Nguyễn Mạnh Hùng
  - Front Committee's Chairman: Lương Thị Ngân
  - Party Committee's Secretary: Đỗ Đức Hòa

Area
  - Total: 188.87 km^{2} (72.92 sq mi)

Population (December 31, 2022)
  - Total: 160,239
  - Density: 1,471/km^{2} (3,810/sq mi)
  - Ethnicities: Kinh; Tanka
- Time zone: UTC+7 (Indochina Time)
- ZIP code: 4000–05000–05100 (Note: An official code from December 31, 2022, to present.)
- Website: Kienthuy.Haiphong.gov.vn; Kienthuy.Haiphong.dcs.vn

Kiến Thụy [kiən˧˥:tʰwḭʔ˨˩] is a rural district of Hải Phòng, the third largest city of Vietnam.

== Geography ==
Currently, Kiến Thụy rural district is divided into 16 commune-level administrative units.

- 1 municipality : Núi Đối capital-township.
- 19 communes : Du Lễ, Đại Đồng, Đại Hợp, Đoàn Xá, Đông Phương, Hữu Bằng, Kiến Hưng, Kiến Quốc, Minh Tân, Ngũ Phúc, Tân Phong, Tân Trào, Thanh Sơn, Thuận Thiên, Tú Sơn.

=== Topography ===
Kiến Thụy rural district is located in the Southeastern and about 16 km from the center of Hải Phòng city. Its surface is almost flat and not very high compared to sea level, thus, this is detrimental to residential activities in the rainy seasons.

Its area is the intersection of two large rivers in the East of the Red River Delta, which is Đa Độ and Văn Úc.

- Hà Nội – Hải Phòng Highway.
- Ninh Bình – Hải Phòng Highway.

=== Demography ===
According to the statistics of the Central Steering Committee of the General Census for the Population and Housing (Note: Ban chỉ-đạo Tổng điều-tra Dân-số và Nhà-ở Trung-ương, Chính-phủ Việt-nam.) on December 31, 2022, the total population of Kiến Thụy rural district reached 160,239. In particular, all people are registered as Kẻ Kinh.

== See also ==
- Ninh Giang district
- Quỳnh Phụ district
- Thái Thụy district
- Tứ Kỳ district
- Vĩnh Bảo district
