= Commune-level town =

Subdivision of Vietnam

Commune-level town (Vietnamese: thị trấn), also known as township, was a type of third tier subdivision of Vietnam, along with ward and commune have equal status. By virtue of Decree No. 42/2009/ND-CP, townships are officially classified into Class-2, Class-3, Class-4 or Class-5. On 1 July 2025, as a result of a constitutional amendment and related legislation, all Commune-level towns ceased to exist.

The townships can only subordinate to district as the Third Tier unit.

== Fact ==
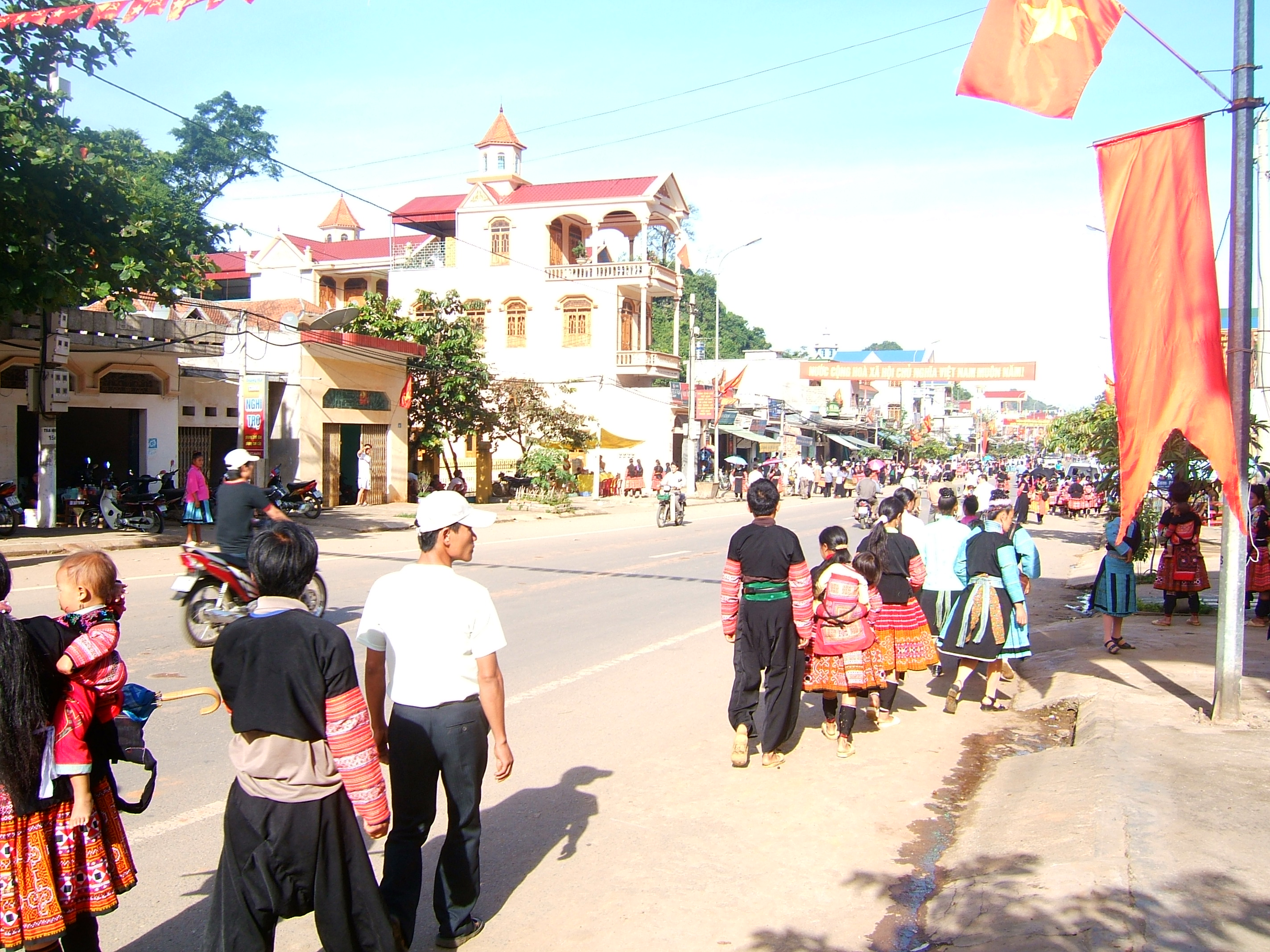
Mộc Châu town in Sơn La Province.

The difference between a township and a commune is mainly related to their industrialization rate. Communes are dominated by the practice of agriculture (including farming, forestry, fishery, and so on), whereas townships generally have a more diversified economic base. Population density in townships is also higher than in communes. Other criteria, such as population (as opposed to density), revenue received from taxes, and land area are generally not taken into account. Townships often have higher budgets than communes, but many counter-examples exist.

The seat of government of a district is generally located in a township designated as a district capital (Vietnamese: huyện lỵ)—as opposed to a commune—except when the town's geographical location is not favorable.

As of December 31, 2008, Vietnam had 617 commune-level towns. Thanh Hóa Province with 30 commune-level towns is the most of all province-level administrative units, followed by Hanoi with 22 commune-level towns. Ninh Thuận Province has only three commune-level towns and Đà Nẵng has none.
