= Sa Pa (town) =

Coordinates: 22°20′26″N 103°49′51″E

Sa Pa Sapa
- District-level town (Class-4)
- Sa Pa Town; Thị xã Sa Pa
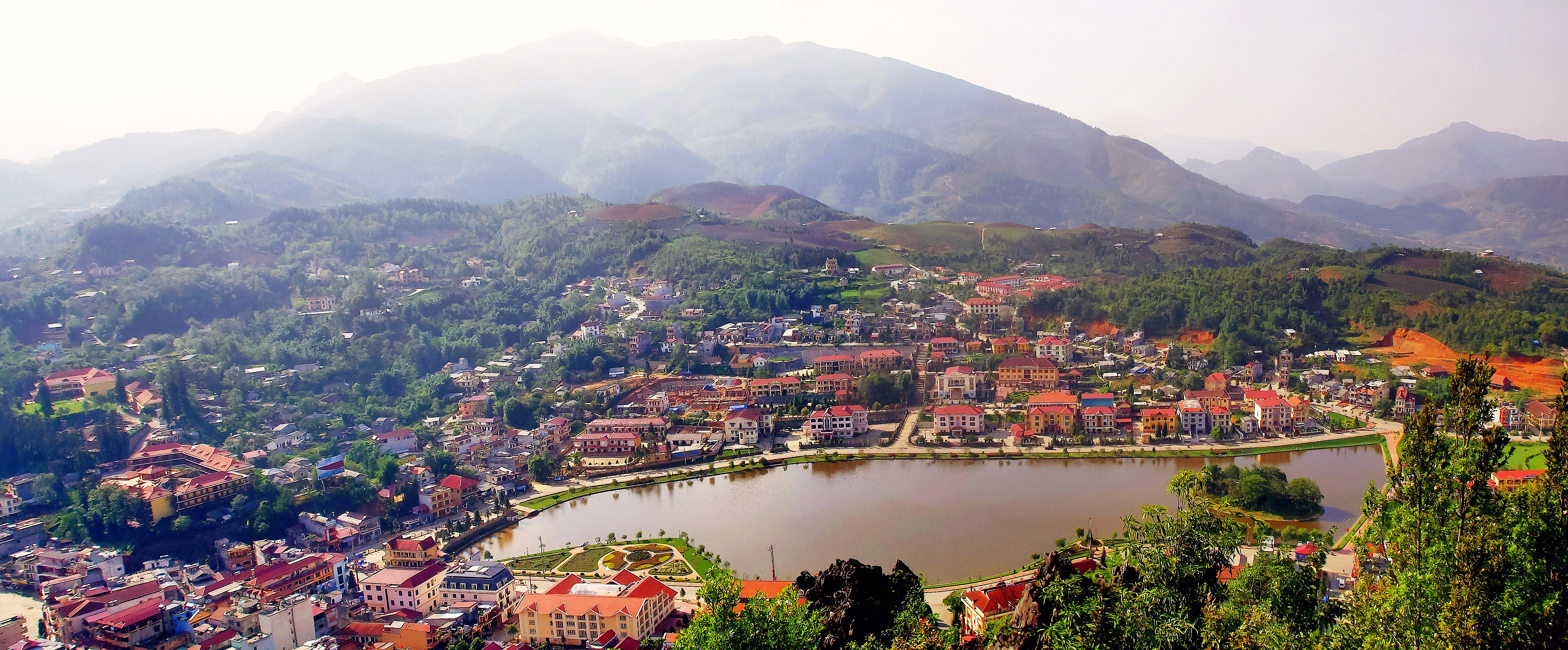
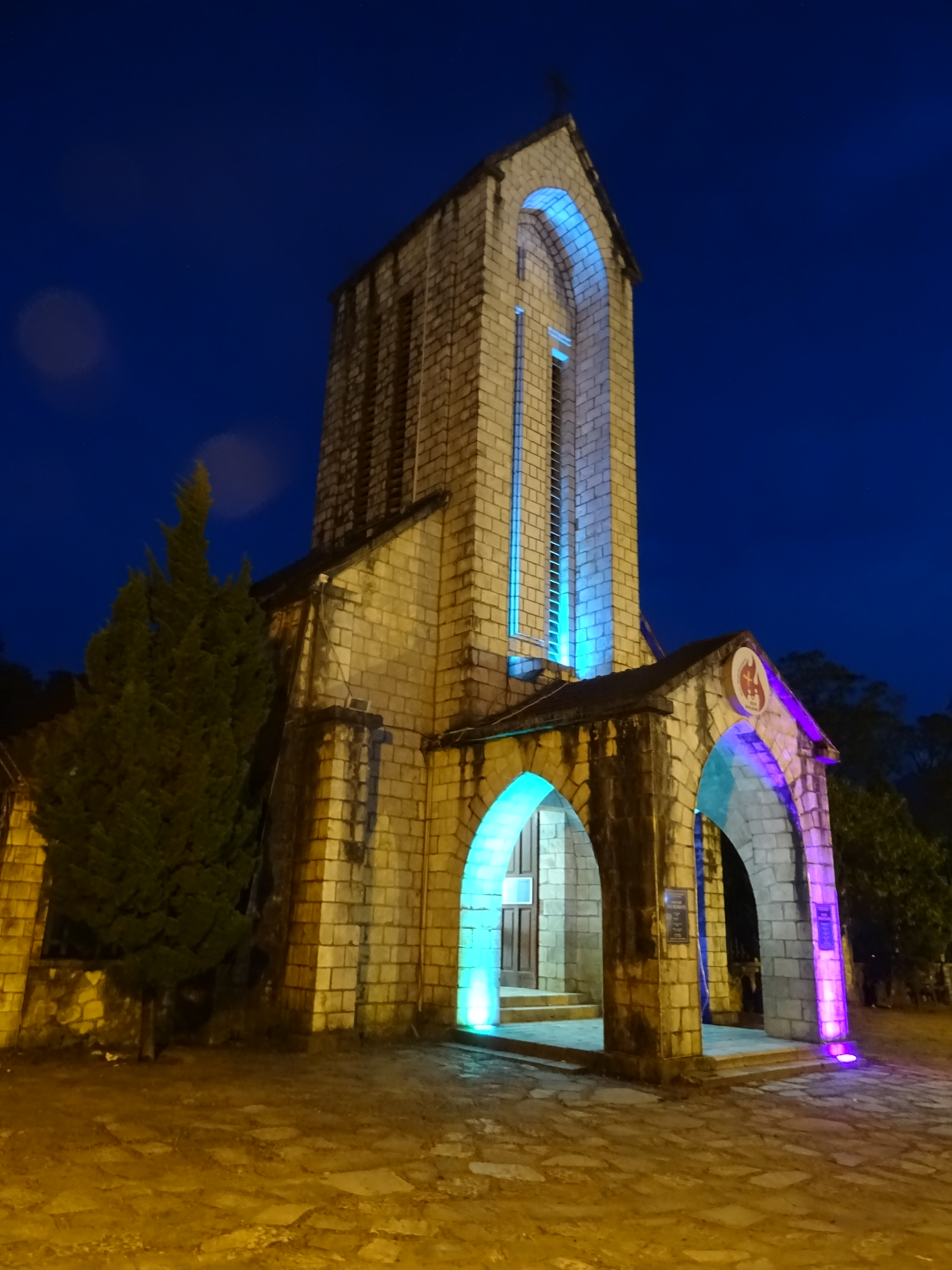
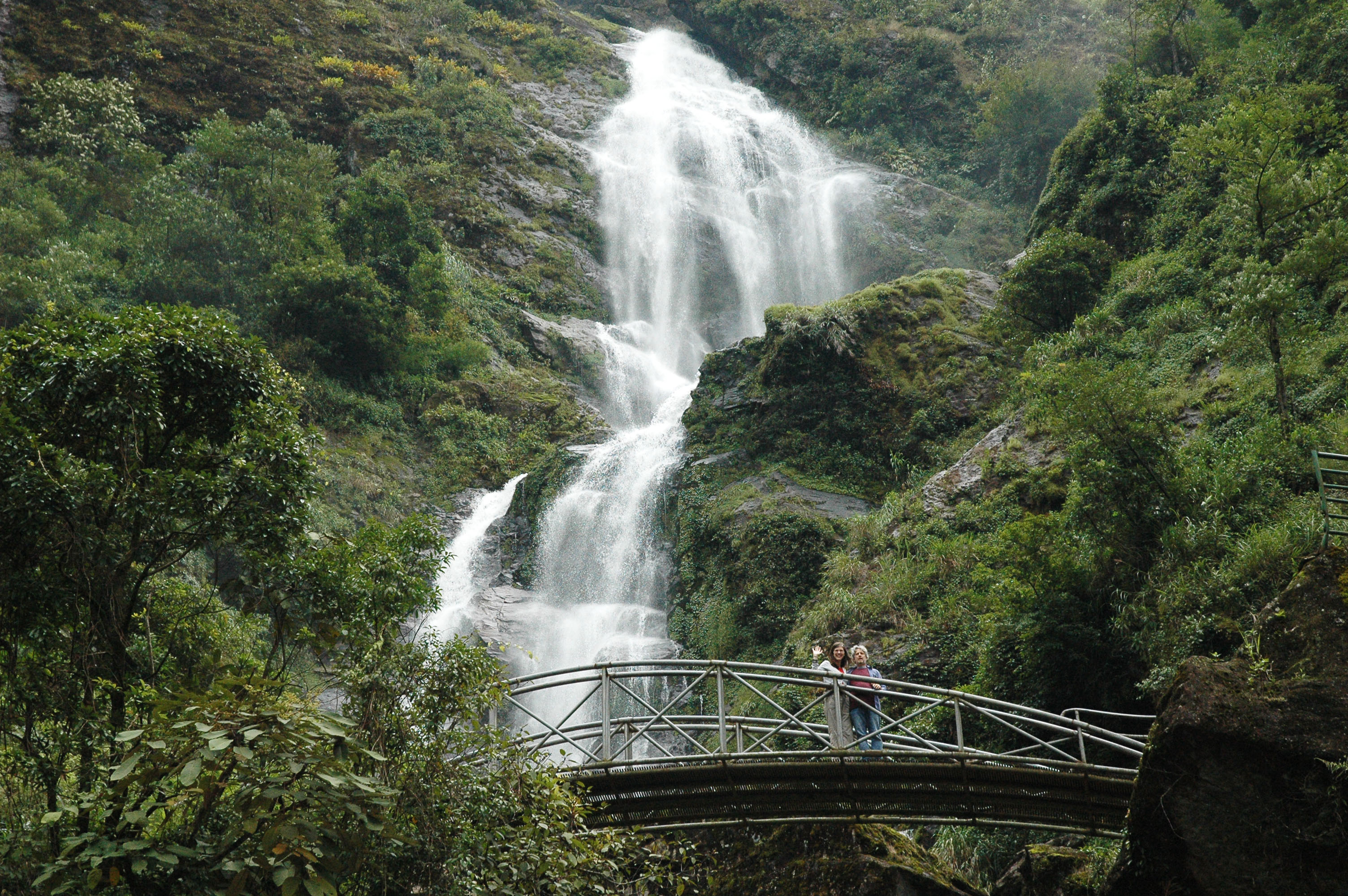
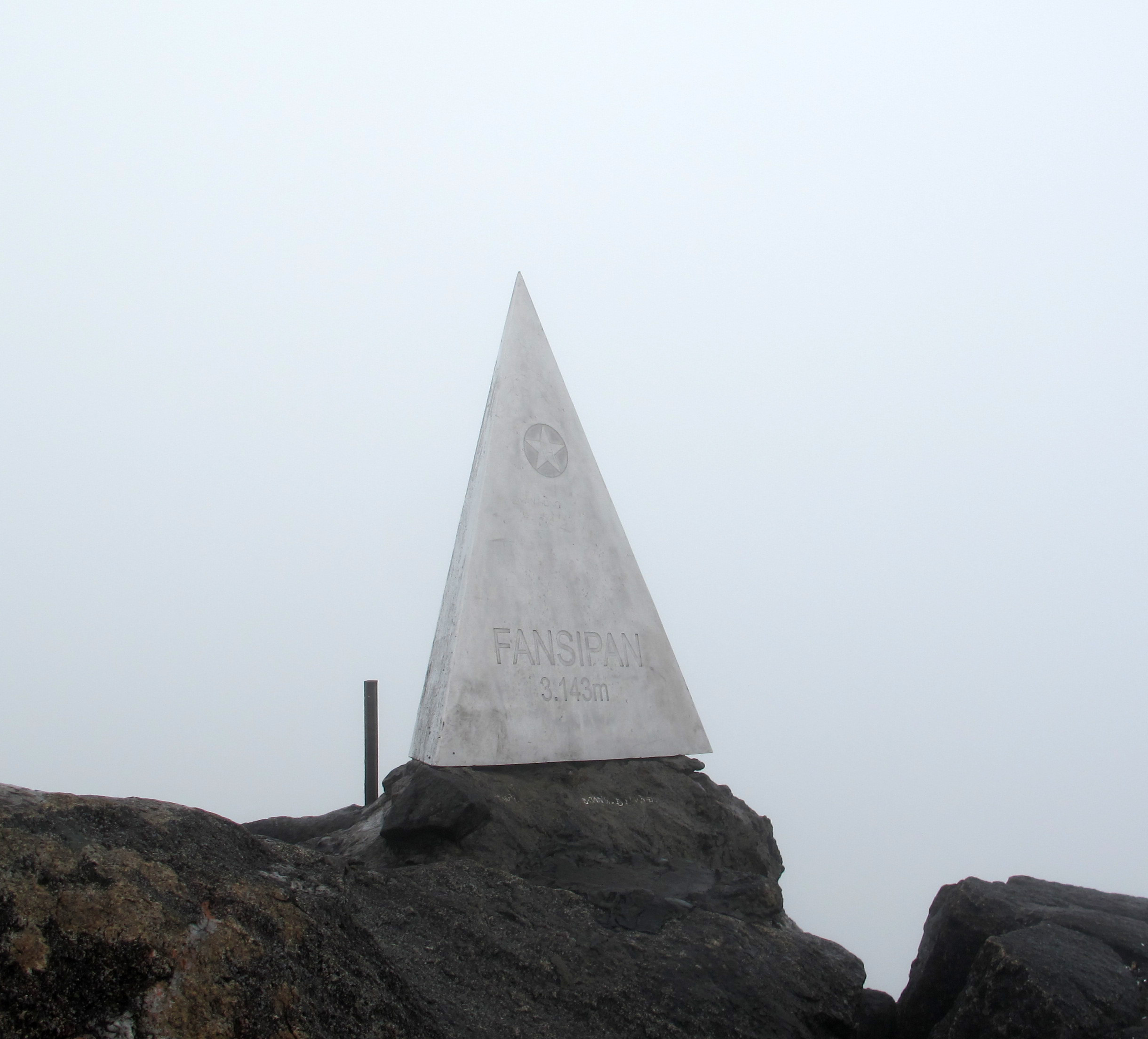
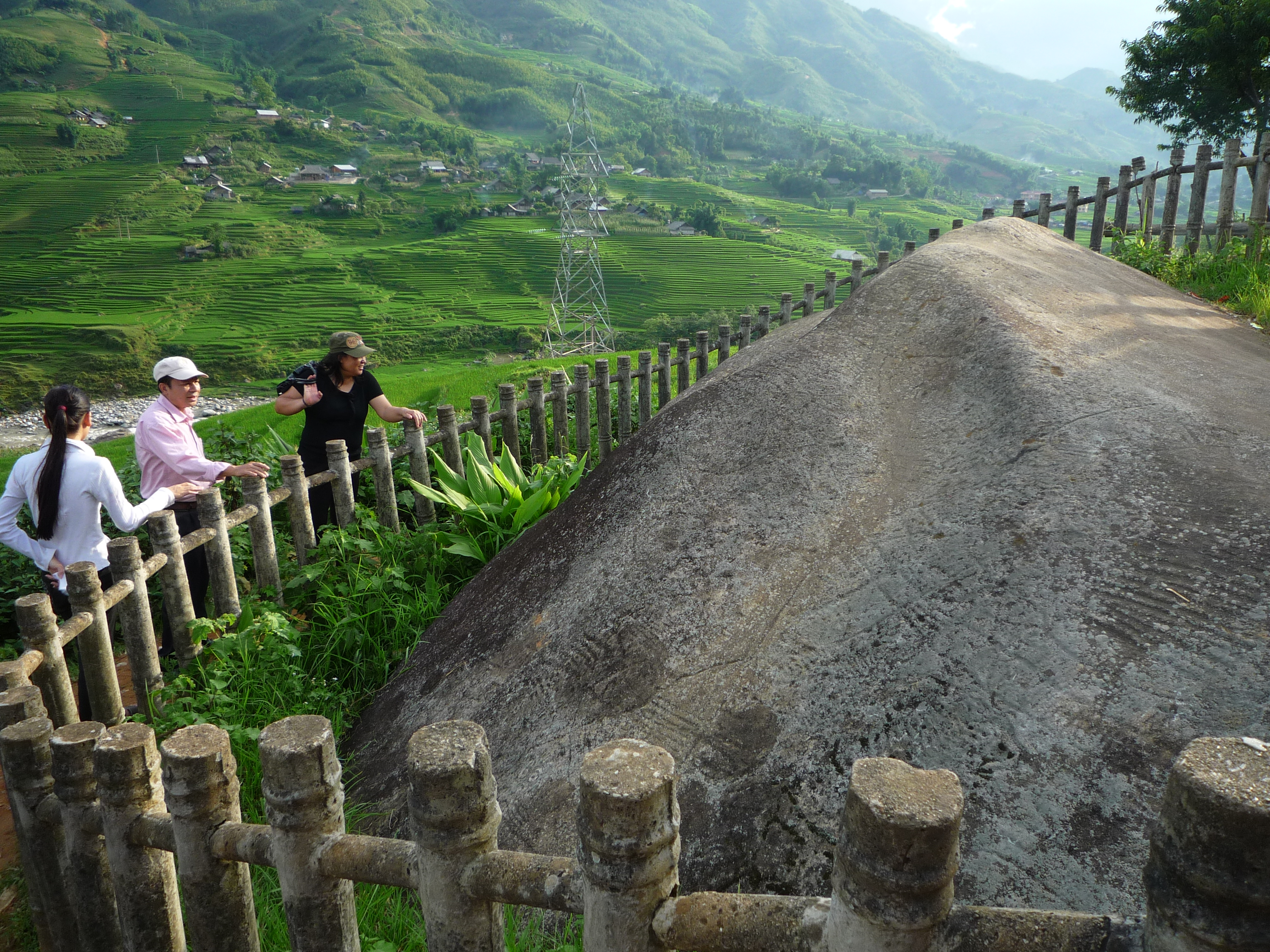
- View of Sa Pa

- Seal
- Country: Vietnam
- Region: Northwest
- Province: Lào Cai
- Capital: Sa Pa ward

Area
  - District-level town (Class-4): 685 km^{2} (264 sq mi)
- Elevation: 1,600 m (5,200 ft)

Population (2022)
  - District-level town (Class-4): 70,663
  - Density: 103/km^{2} (267/sq mi)
  - Urban: 20,503
  - Rural: 50,160
- Time zone: UTC+7 (UTC + 7)
- Postal code: 330000
- Climate: subtropical highland climate (Cfb)

Sa Pa (Vietnamese pronunciation: [ʂaː paː], also written Sapa; French: Chapa) is a former district-level town (thị xã) in Lào Cai province in the Northwest region of Vietnam. It covers an area of 685 km^{2} (264 sq mi) and had a population of 70,663 as of 2022.

Sa Pa is a market center and tourist destination. Ethnic minorities constitute most of the population, notably the Hmong, Dao, Giáy, and Tày.

== Etymology ==
The origin of the name "Sa Pa" is uncertain. It has been associated with Chinese Shābà (沙壩), though this connection is not definitively established. The toponym appeared as "Chapa" in French colonial-era records of Tonkin in the late 19th century. In modern Vietnamese, it is pronounced [saː paː].

== History ==
The Sa Pa area has evidence of prehistoric human presence, but its earliest inhabitants are not well documented. Archaeological remains in the Muong Hoa Valley include a group of engraved rocks, with over a hundred petroglyphs featuring geometric, human-like, and symbolic motifs.

=== Early settlement ===
Later, the area was inhabited by several ethnic groups, including the Hmong, Dao, Giáy, and Tày, who still live in Sa Pa.

=== French colonial period ===
France gained control over Tonkin after its victory over China in the Sino-French War in 1885, and French Indochina was established in 1887. The Lao Cai region came under direct French colonial military administration to curtail banditry and political resistance on the northern frontier, including the Sa Pa area. Units of the French Army marched from the Red River Delta into the northern mountainous regions as part of the "pacification" of Tonkin. The border between China and Tonkin was delimited by treaties signed in 1887 and 1895, and formally demarcated by 1896. In 1897, the French colonial government launched an expedition to study the ethnic minorities in the mountainous highlands, and the area was visited by missionaries from the Paris Foreign Missions Society.

In 1903, an expedition of the Indochina Geographical Service identified the area, referring to it as Lo Suoi Tung ("valley of the long stream"). Its climate and scenery led to its development as a hill station. A sanatorium was built in 1909, followed by a military garrison in 1912. A tourist office opened in 1917, and villas were constructed by French residents from 1918 onward. With the completion of the Hanoi–Lào Cai railway in 1920, Sa Pa became a summer retreat, with nearly 300 villas built by that time.

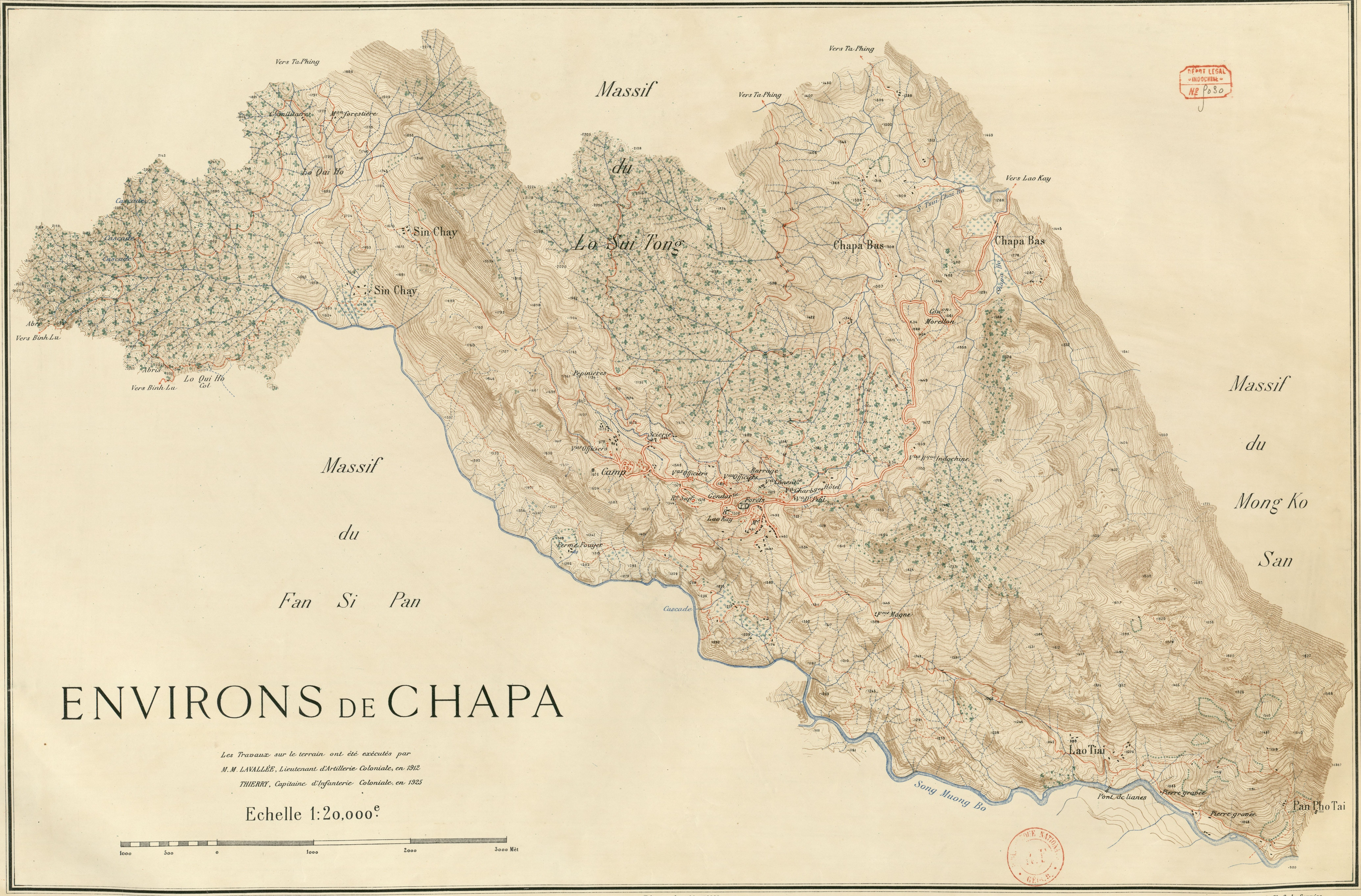
Map of Sa Pa, 1926

=== First Indochina War period (1945–1954) ===
As World War II ended in August 1945, conflict began in French Indochina, starting with the August Revolution and escalating into wider civil conflict, followed by the First Indochina War (1946–1954). During this period, nearly all colonial buildings in Sa Pa were destroyed, and most of the population fled.

=== Recent history ===
In the early 1960s, new inhabitants from the lowlands migrated to Sa Pa under a government resettlement program of the Democratic Republic of Vietnam. The Kinh (Viet) population was temporarily displaced during the 1979 Sino-Vietnamese War but returned later that year.

In the 1990s, Sa Pa was restored and expanded, with significant growth in tourism infrastructure. The number of hotel rooms increased from 40 in 1990 to 300 in 1995, and by 2003 the town had about 60 hotels with 1,500 rooms. In 1993, the Vietnamese government opened Sa Pa to international tourism. The "Area of Old Carved Stone in Sapa" has been on Vietnam's tentative UNESCO World Heritage list since 1997.

== Geography ==
Sa Pa is located in western Lào Cai province, in Northwest Vietnam, approximately 250 km (160 mi) northwest of Hanoi and 20 km (12 mi) from the border with China. It is bordered to the west by Tam Đường and Tân Uyên districts of Lai Châu province, to the east by Lào Cai city and Bảo Thắng district, to the south by Văn Bàn district, and to the north by Bát Xát district.

The Hoàng Liên Sơn mountain range, including Vietnam's highest peak, Fansipan, is the main mountain range in the area. Sa Pa lies at an average elevation of about 1,600 m (5,200 ft). The region has a mountain ecosystem with vegetation varying by elevation. Remaining old-growth forest, including the critically endangered Fansipan fir, occurs at 2,000–2,500 m. Stunted forest occurs at 2,500–3,000 m, while higher elevations support sparse high-altitude vegetation, including dwarf bamboo.

The Hoàng Liên Sơn mountain range supports high biodiversity, including many endemic species. Much of the range south of Sa Pa is protected within Hoàng Liên National Park, established in 2006. The Mường Hoa Valley lies between Fansipan and the town of Sa Pa and is known for terraced rice fields.

=== Geology ===
The geology of Sa Pa is mainly composed of metamorphosed sedimentary rocks and granite intrusions. These formations run northwest–southeast, particularly in the Mường Hoa Valley. On the northeastern side of the valley, marble and metamorphosed carbonate rocks form ridges with karst features.

The valley floor is mainly composed of schist, with smaller amounts of gneiss. Granite intrusions extend from the Mường Hoa River to the summit ridge of Fansipan and beyond. High humidity and rainfall result in strong chemical weathering, producing predominantly clay-rich soils.

=== Climate ===
Sa Pa

Climate chart (precipitation, max. and min. temperature)
J	F	M	A	M	J	J	A	S	O	N	D
70 12 6	73 14 7	104 18 10	213 21 14	340 22 16	381 22 17	461 23 17	451 23 17	303 21 15	201 19 13	106 16 10	65 13 7
- █ Average max. and min. temperatures in °C
- █ Precipitation totals in mm
- Source: Vietnam Meteorological Administration
Imperial conversion
J	F	M	A	M	J	J	A	S	O	N	D
2.8 54 43	2.9 57 45	4.1 64 50	8.4 70 57	13 72 61	15 72 63	18 73 63	18 73 63	12 70 59	7.9 66 55	4.2 61 50	2.6 55 45
- █ Average max. and min. temperatures in °F
- █ Precipitation totals in inches

Climate data for Sa Pa, elevation 1,570 m (5,150 ft)
Month	Jan	Feb	Mar	Apr	May	Jun	Jul	Aug	Sep	Oct	Nov	Dec	Year
Record high °C (°F)	23.2 (73.8)	25.8 (78.4)	28.1 (82.6)	29.8 (85.6)	30.0 (86.0)	29.4 (84.9)	29.3 (84.7)	29.6 (85.3)	28.2 (82.8)	27.2 (81.0)	26.7 (80.1)	24.0 (75.2)	30.0 (86.0)
Mean daily maximum °C (°F)	12.3 (54.1)	14.3 (57.7)	18.2 (64.8)	21.3 (70.3)	22.4 (72.3)	22.9 (73.2)	23.0 (73.4)	23.0 (73.4)	21.7 (71.1)	19.0 (66.2)	16.1 (61.0)	13.2 (55.8)	18.9 (66.0)
Daily mean °C (°F)	8.6 (47.5)	10.4 (50.7)	13.9 (57.0)	17.1 (62.8)	18.9 (66.0)	19.8 (67.6)	19.8 (67.6)	19.5 (67.1)	18.2 (64.8)	15.7 (60.3)	12.5 (54.5)	9.4 (48.9)	15.3 (59.5)
Mean daily minimum °C (°F)	6.2 (43.2)	7.8 (46.0)	10.8 (51.4)	14.0 (57.2)	16.3 (61.3)	17.6 (63.7)	17.7 (63.9)	17.4 (63.3)	15.9 (60.6)	13.7 (56.7)	10.2 (50.4)	7.0 (44.6)	12.9 (55.2)
Record low °C (°F)	−6.1 (21.0)	−1.3 (29.7)	−3.5 (25.7)	3.0 (37.4)	8.2 (46.8)	10.8 (51.4)	7.0 (44.6)	10.4 (50.7)	8.7 (47.7)	5.6 (42.1)	1.0 (33.8)	−3.2 (26.2)	−6.1 (21.0)
Average rainfall mm (inches)	70.2 (2.76)	73.5 (2.89)	104.5 (4.11)	213.4 (8.40)	340.6 (13.41)	381.4 (15.02)	461.0 (18.15)	451.9 (17.79)	303.1 (11.93)	201.3 (7.93)	106.3 (4.19)	65.7 (2.59)	2,779.6 (109.43)
Average rainy days	16.3	16.3	15.7	17.9	22.2	24.4	25.6	23.4	19.8	18.6	13.8	13.5	228.1
Average relative humidity (%)	87.8	85.5	82.1	82.3	84.8	86.9	88.3	88.8	90.0	90.8	80.5	80.3	87.2
Mean monthly sunshine hours	113.3	115.6	151.2	167.8	148.1	98.9	104.1	114.2	101.7	94.0	112.5	121.0	1,435.9
Source 1: Vietnam Institute for Building Science and Technology
Source 2: The Yearbook of Indochina (1930-1931)

Sa Pa has a subtropical highland climate (Cfb) under the Köppen climate classification. The mean annual temperature is 15.3 °C (59.5 °F), with a record high of 30.0 °C (86.0 °F) and a record low of −6.1 °C (21.0 °F). The warmest months are July and August, while the coldest are December and January.

There is a distinct wet season from May to September, with the heaviest rainfall in July and August. Mean annual rainfall is 2,779 millimetres (109.4 in), ranging from 2,064 millimetres (81.3 in) to 4,023 millimetres (158.4 in). Humidity typically ranges from 75% to 91%, with an annual mean of 87%. Snow has been recorded in Sa Pa town on multiple occasions between 1971 and 2021.

Prevailing winds are generally west to east, contributing to cloud formation on the upper slopes of the Fansipan massif. These high-altitude areas are frequently covered by cloud and experience high humidity. Clouds also extend into the valleys, where humidity is generally lower than on the mountain slopes.

In eastern parts of Sa Pa, including around Bản Hồ, mean temperatures are higher due to lower elevations.

== Administrative divisions ==
Following the 2025 administrative reorganisation of Lào Cai province, the former Sa Pa town area was reorganised into one ward and five rural communes, effective 1 July 2025.

The new Sa Pa Ward was formed through the merger of six former wards: Hàm Rồng, Ô Quý Hồ, Sa Pả, Cầu Mây, Phan Si Păng, and Sa Pa.

The five rural communes are Bản Hồ, Tả Van, Tả Phìn, Mường Bo, and Ngũ Chỉ Sơn.

== Demographics ==
Unlike most of Vietnam, where the Kinh (Viet) form the majority, ethnic minorities make up most of Sa Pa’s population. The population is estimated to be around 52% Hmong, 25% Dao, 5% Tày, and 2% Giáy, while the Kinh account for about 15%, mainly concentrated in the town center.

These groups maintain distinct cultures, languages, and traditions. Many live in surrounding villages, where they engage in rice cultivation, handicrafts, and tourism, while Kinh residents are more concentrated in administrative and commercial roles in the town.

== Economic and social development ==
The people of the Sa Pa area have been among the poorest in Vietnam, even by rural standards. As of 2022, the poverty rate in Sa Pa was 28%.

Efforts to improve the situation for the local people include development programs conducted by governmental and non-governmental organizations. For example, Sapa O'Chau is a Hmong-run social enterprise based in Sa Pa that arranges visits through trekking and homestays at local villages, as well as placements for volunteers such as English teachers for short or long-term periods. Oxfam is also involved in programs in Sa Pa. Training by the Hoa Sua School also aims to improve vocational skills and earnings potential for residents. Sun of Hope is a charity based in Ho Chi Minh City that helps to rehouse minority families, especially those with young children. They build new homes and refurbish existing homes.

Before the 1990s, the town's economy was mainly based on small-scale agriculture. Tourist arrivals grew from 4,860 to 138,622 between 1995 and 2003, and had surpassed 2 million by 2022.

== Transportation ==
Currently, Sa Pa can only be reached by road, either by National Route 4D or Provincial Road 152 through the Muong Hoa Valley.

Vietnam Railways provides passenger service from Hanoi to Lào Cai station, which is the northern terminus of the Hanoi–Lào Cai railway. From there, one can reach Sa Pa in about an hour by bus, automobile, or motorbike.

The nearest operational passenger airports serving Sa Pa are Noi Bai International Airport, which is 283 km (176 mi) to the southeast, and Dien Bien Airport, which is 264 km (164 mi) to the southwest.

Sapa Airport is currently under construction in Cam Cọn commune, which is located in the Bảo Yên district of Lào Cai province. When fully operational, the 370 ha (914 acres) airport is expected to be capable of serving 1.5 million passengers each year.

== Gallery ==
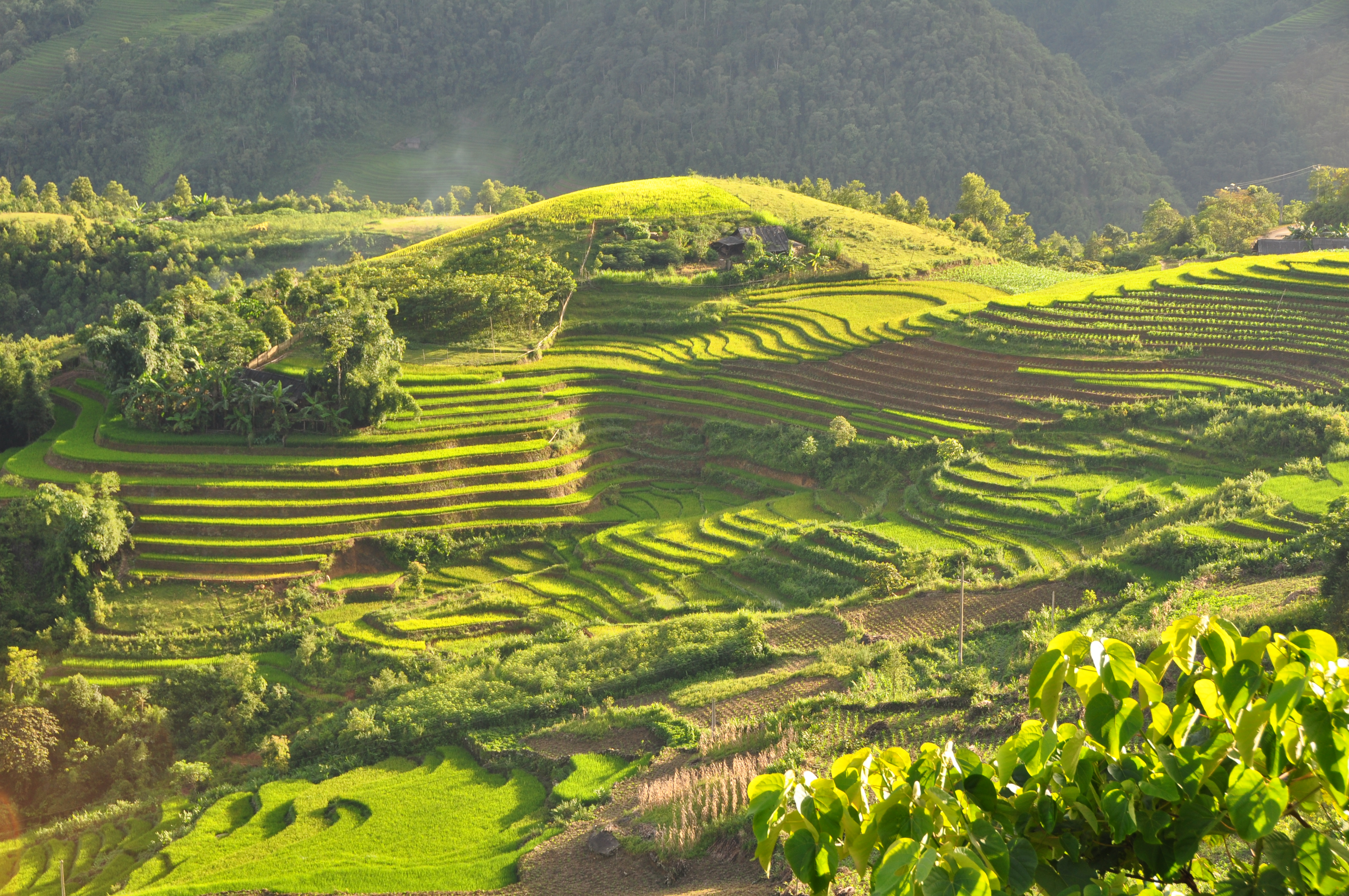
Rice terraces in Sa Pa

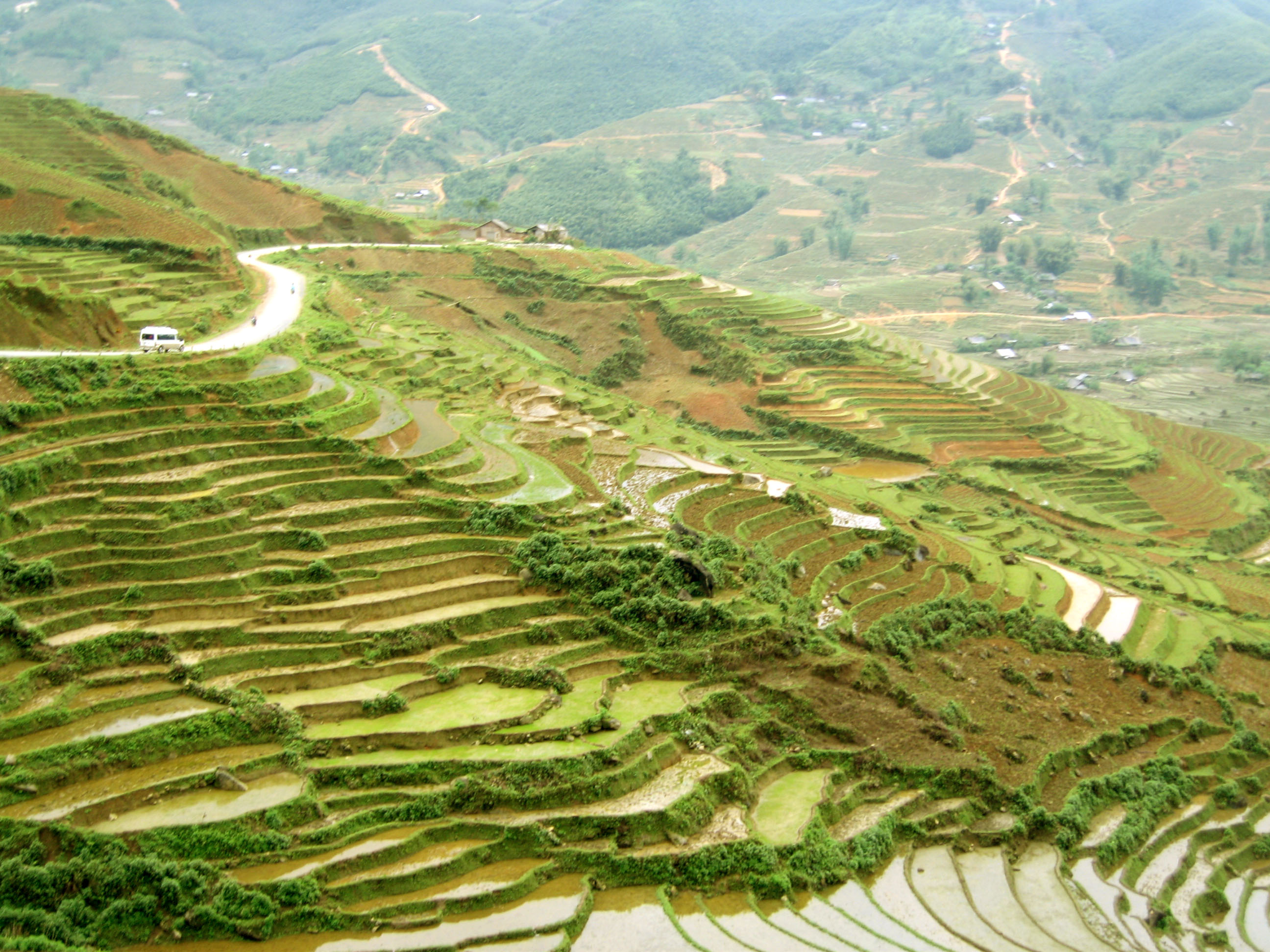
Rice terraces in Sa Pa

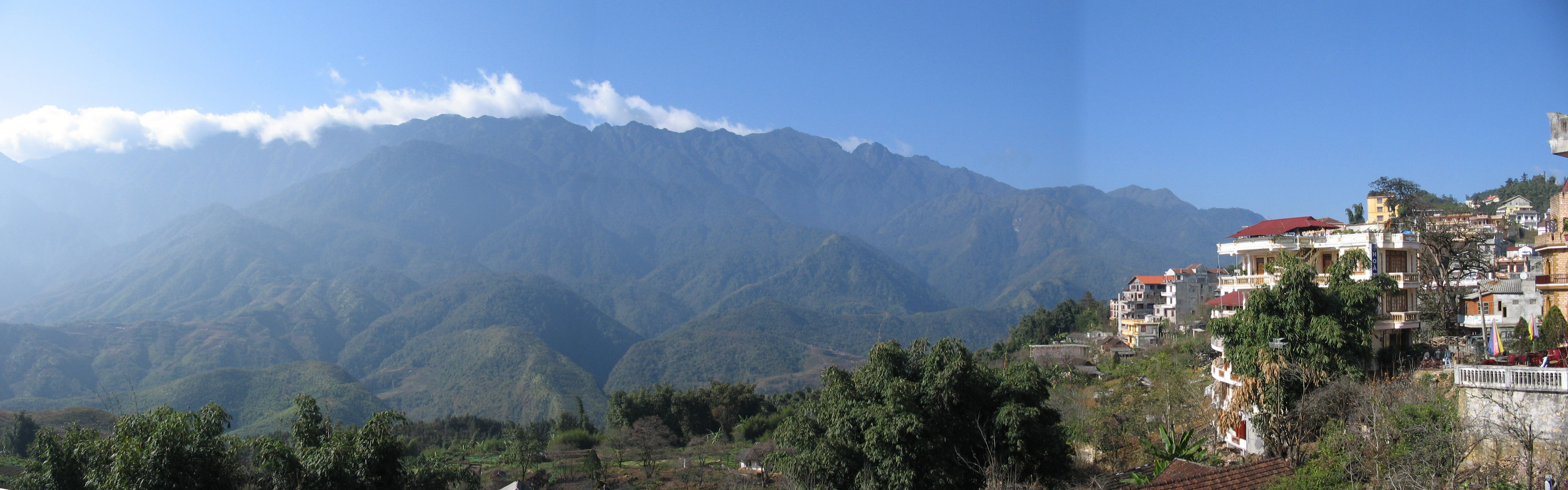
Panorama of Sa Pa towards Fansipan

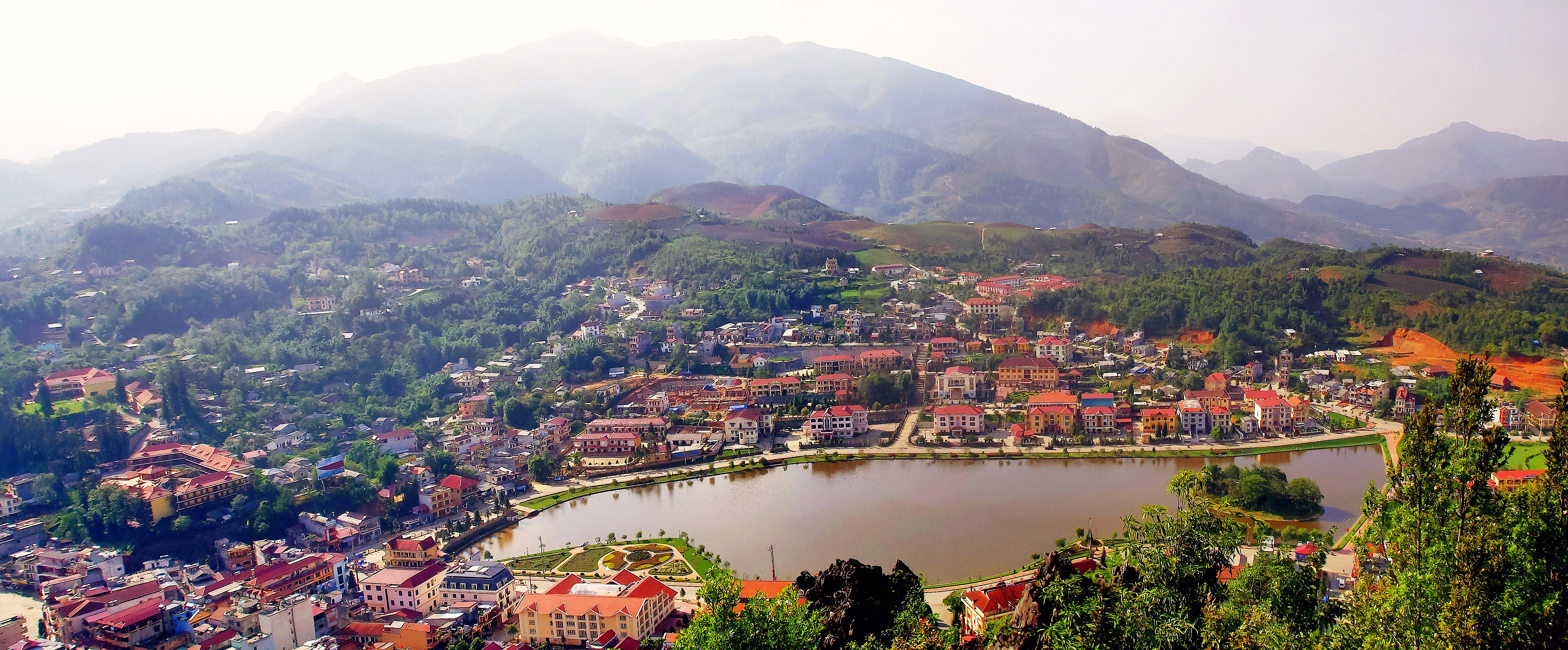
Sa Pa town viewed from Ham Rong mountain

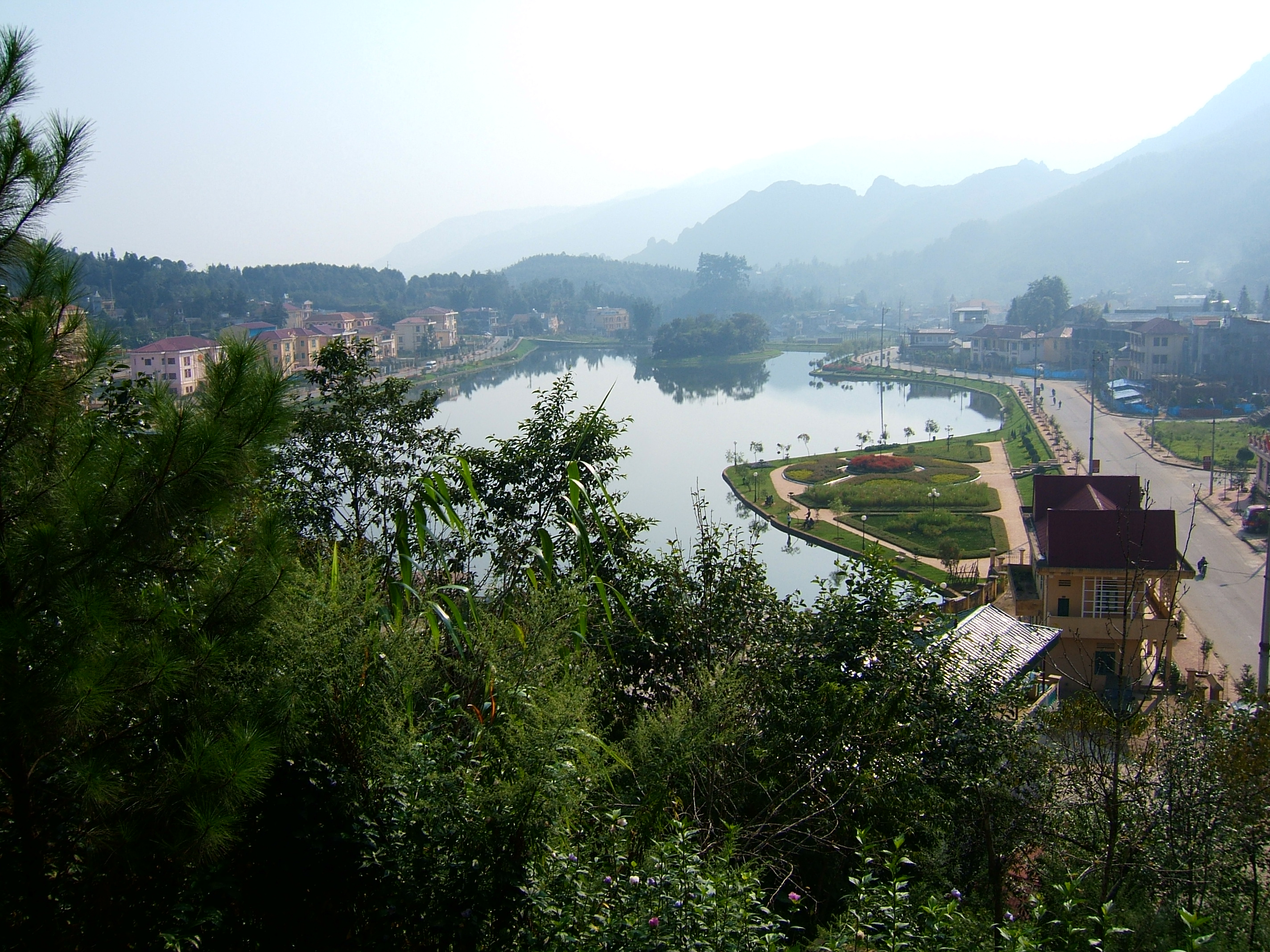
Sa Pa Lake

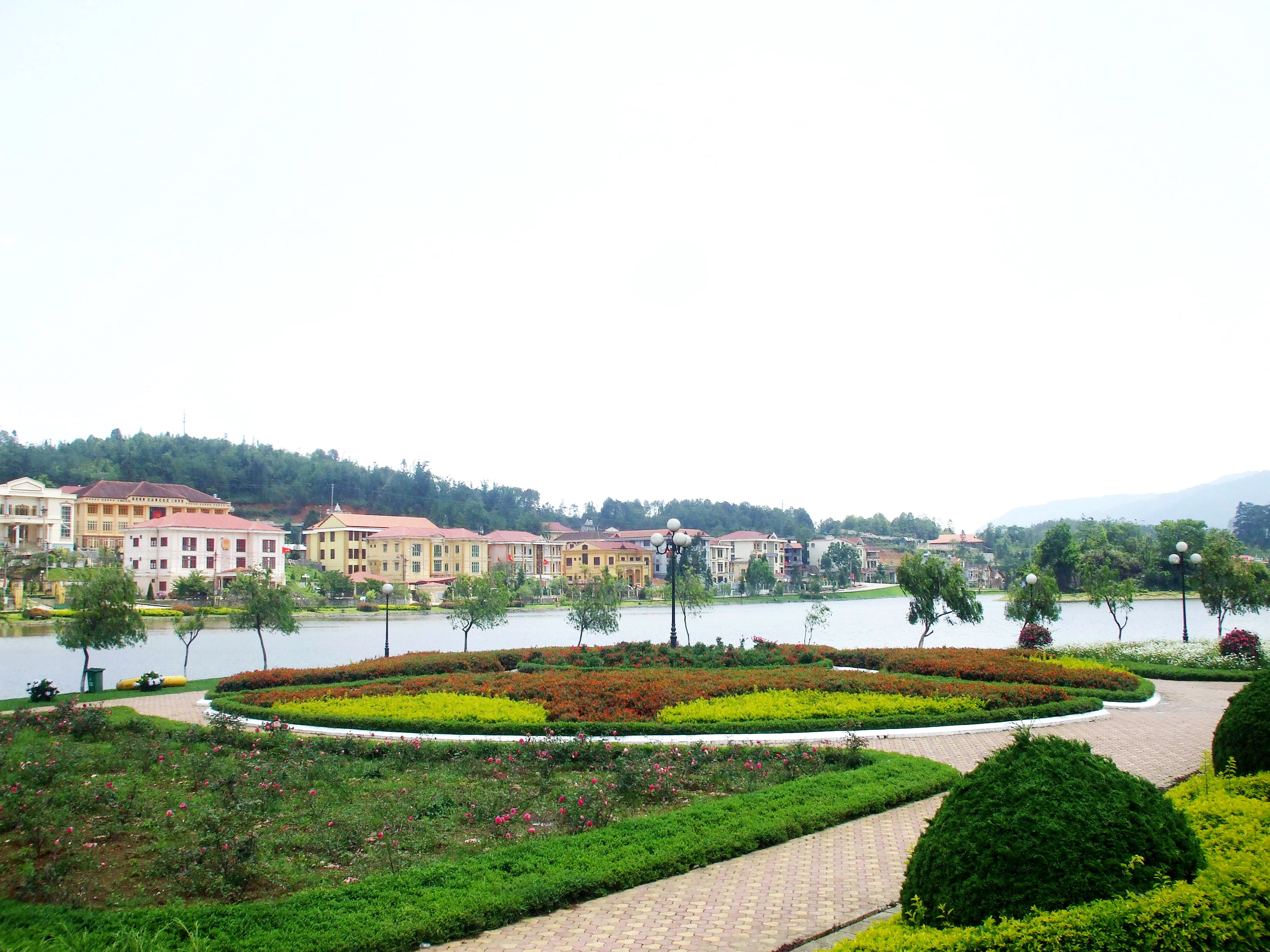
Sa Pa Lake Square

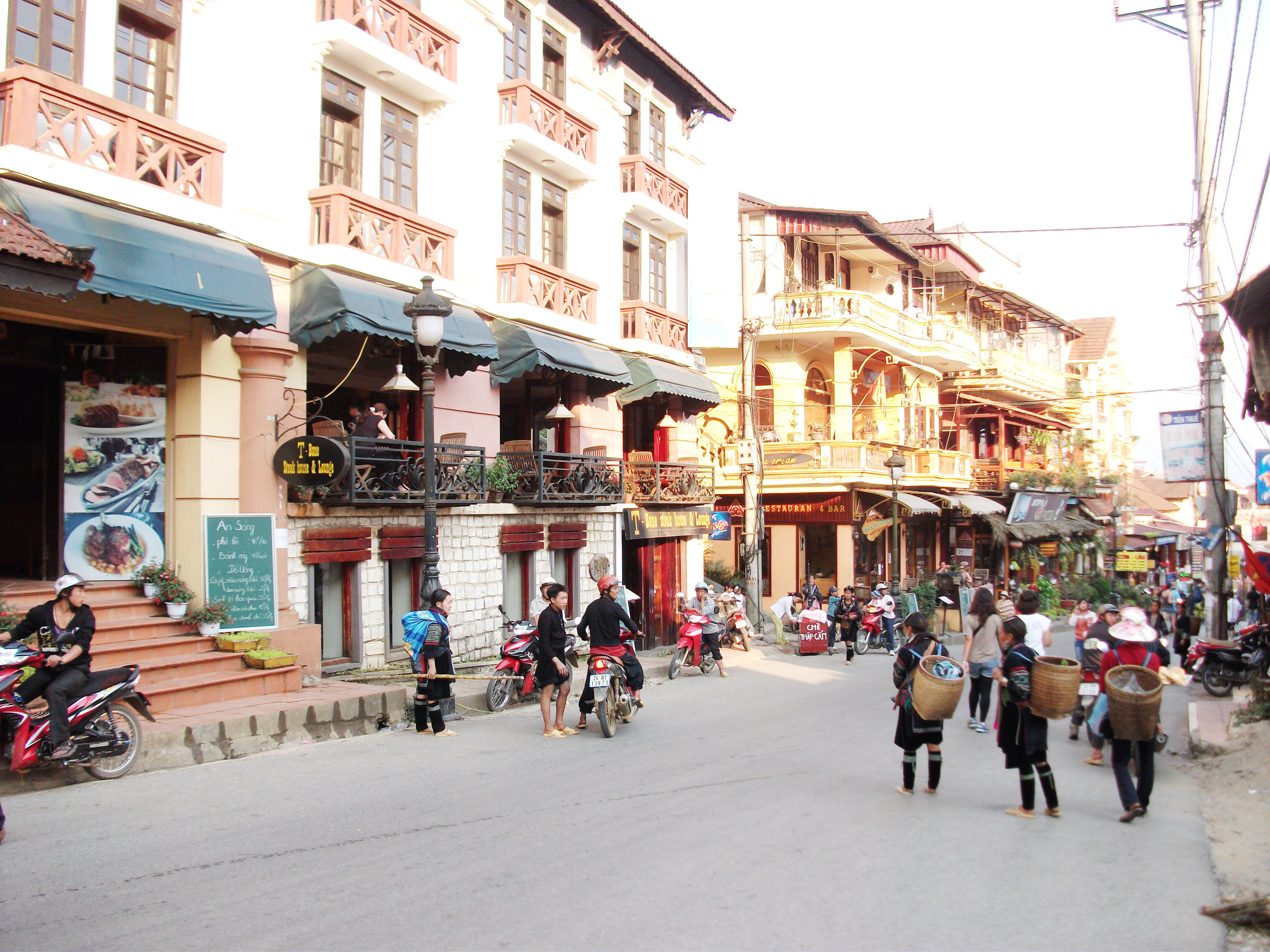
A street in Sa Pa

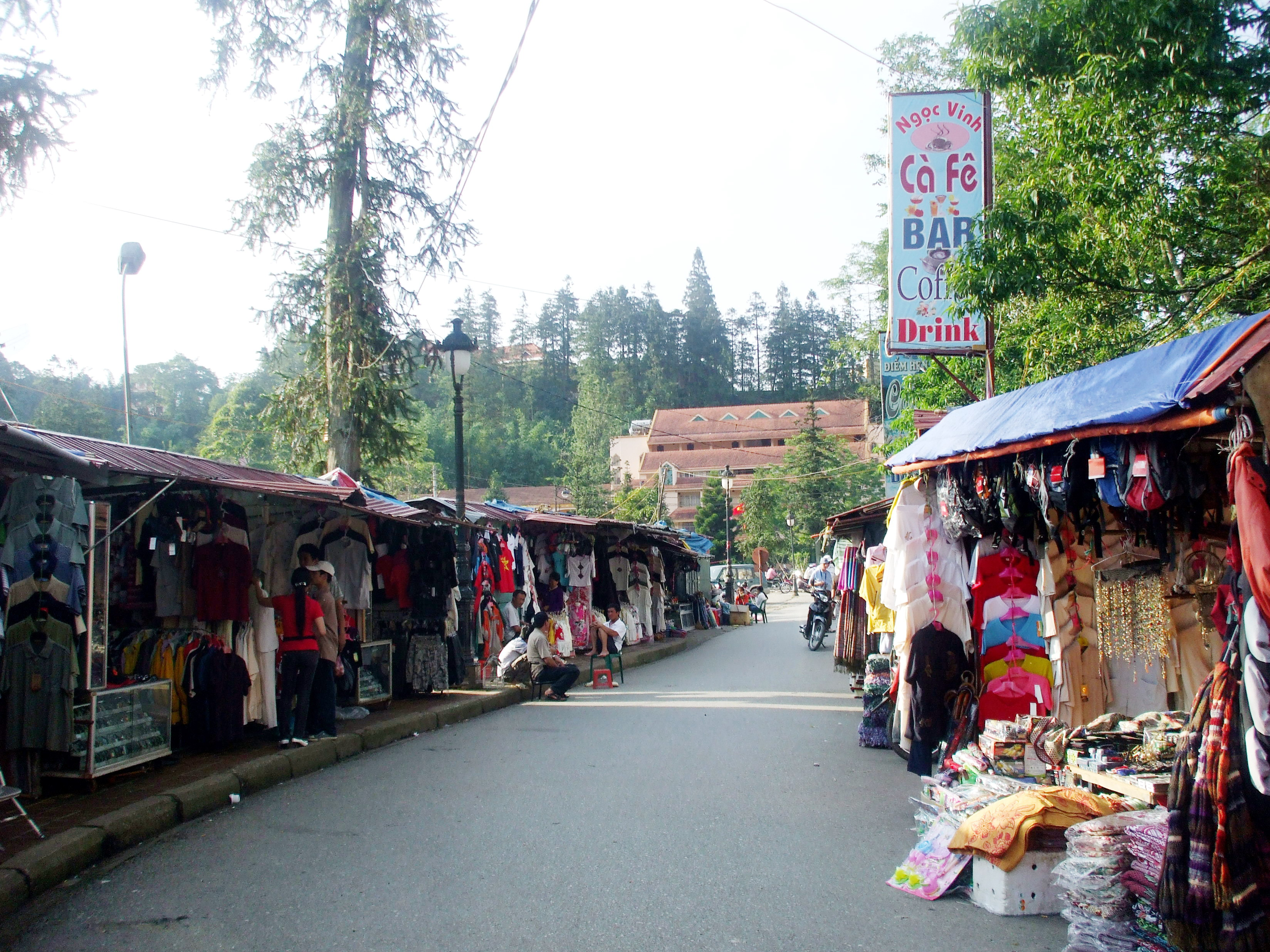
An area selling clothes and other items

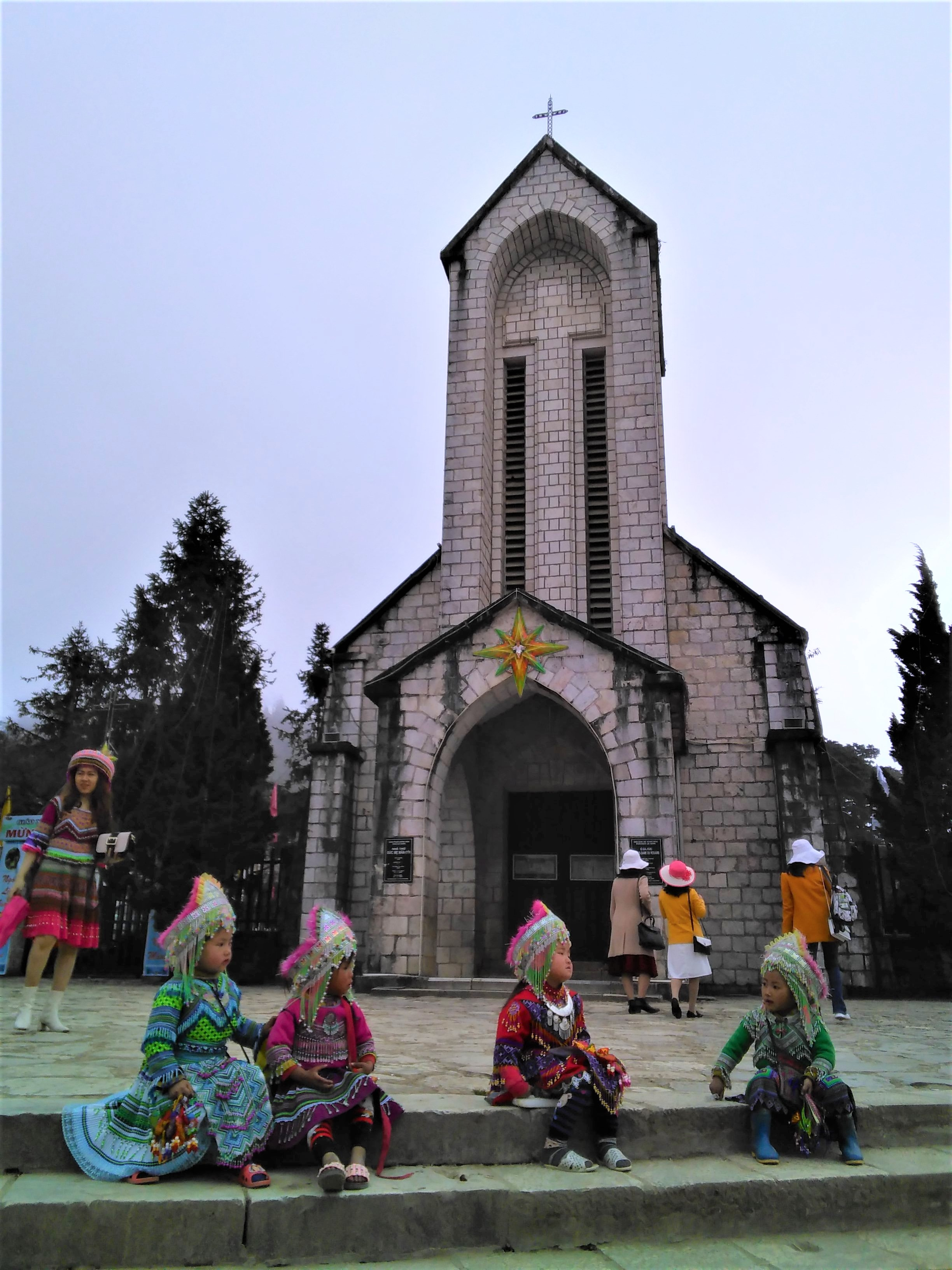
Sa Pa Stone Church

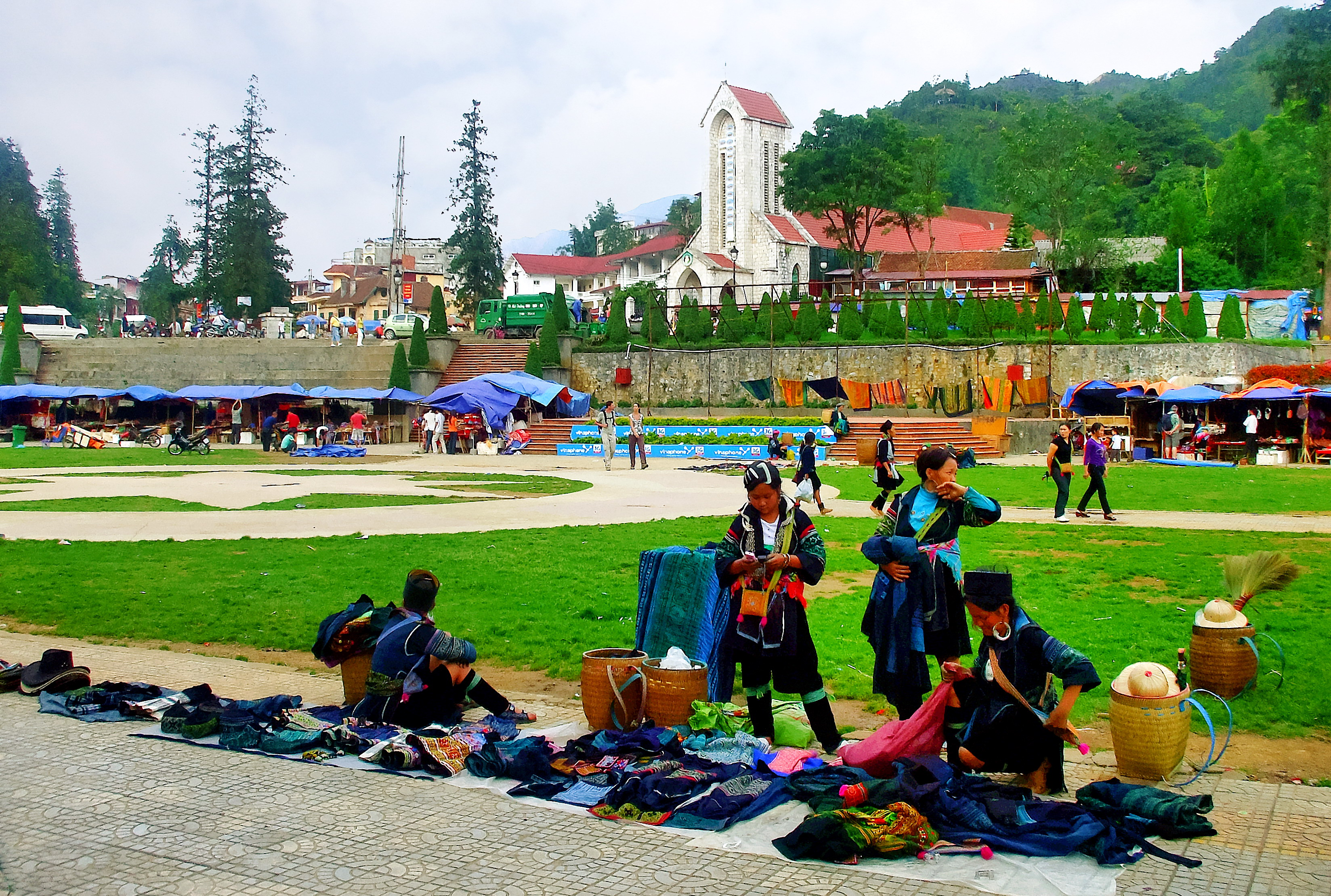
Hmong women selling handicrafts

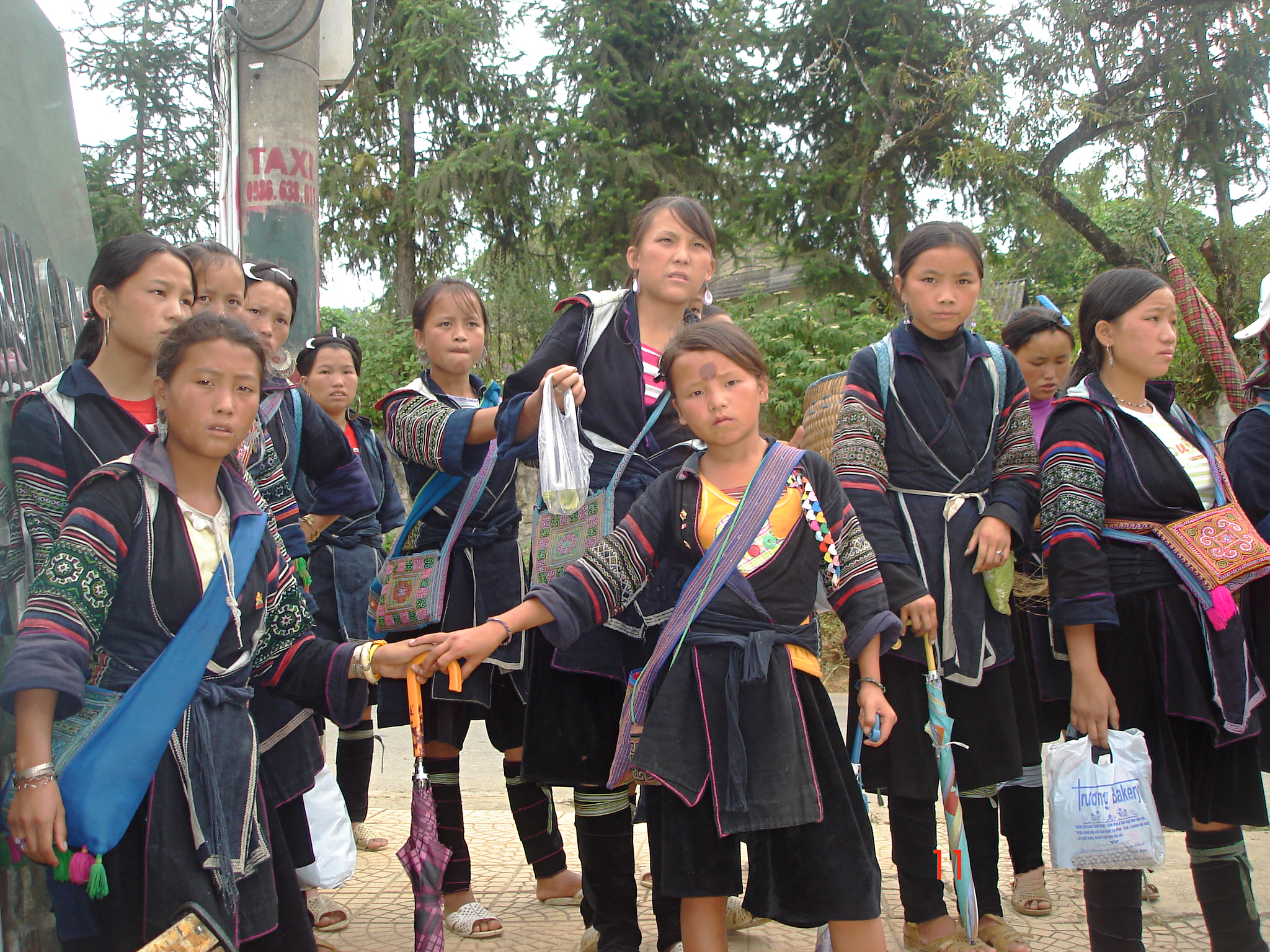
Hmong people in Sa Pa

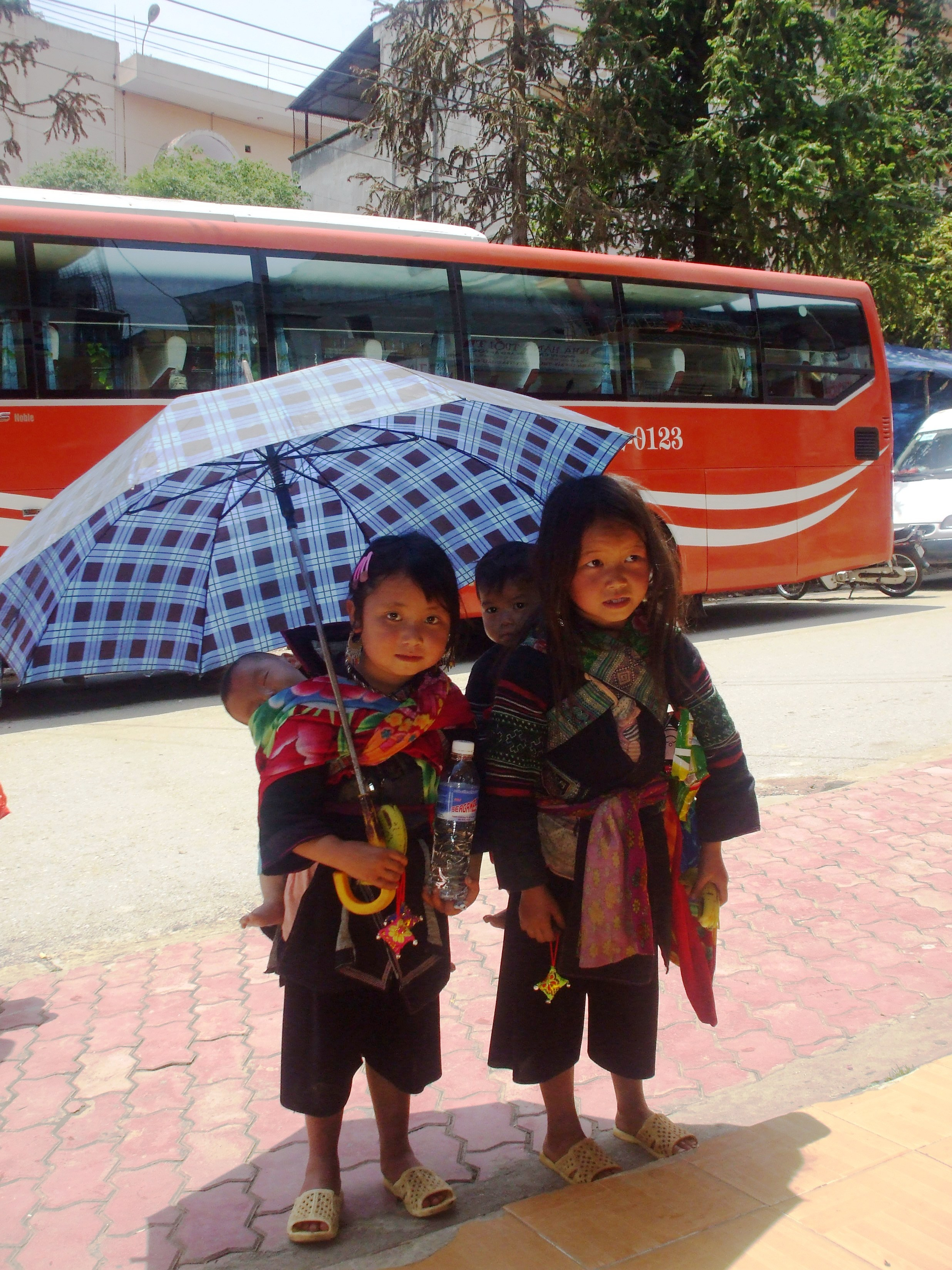
Hmong children

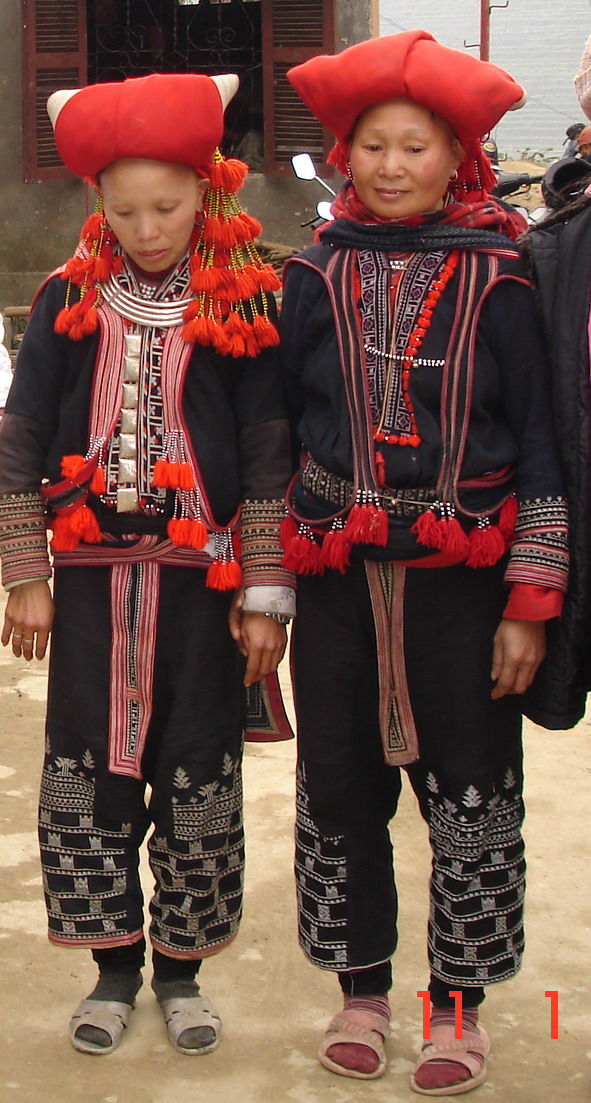
Dao women in traditional costumes

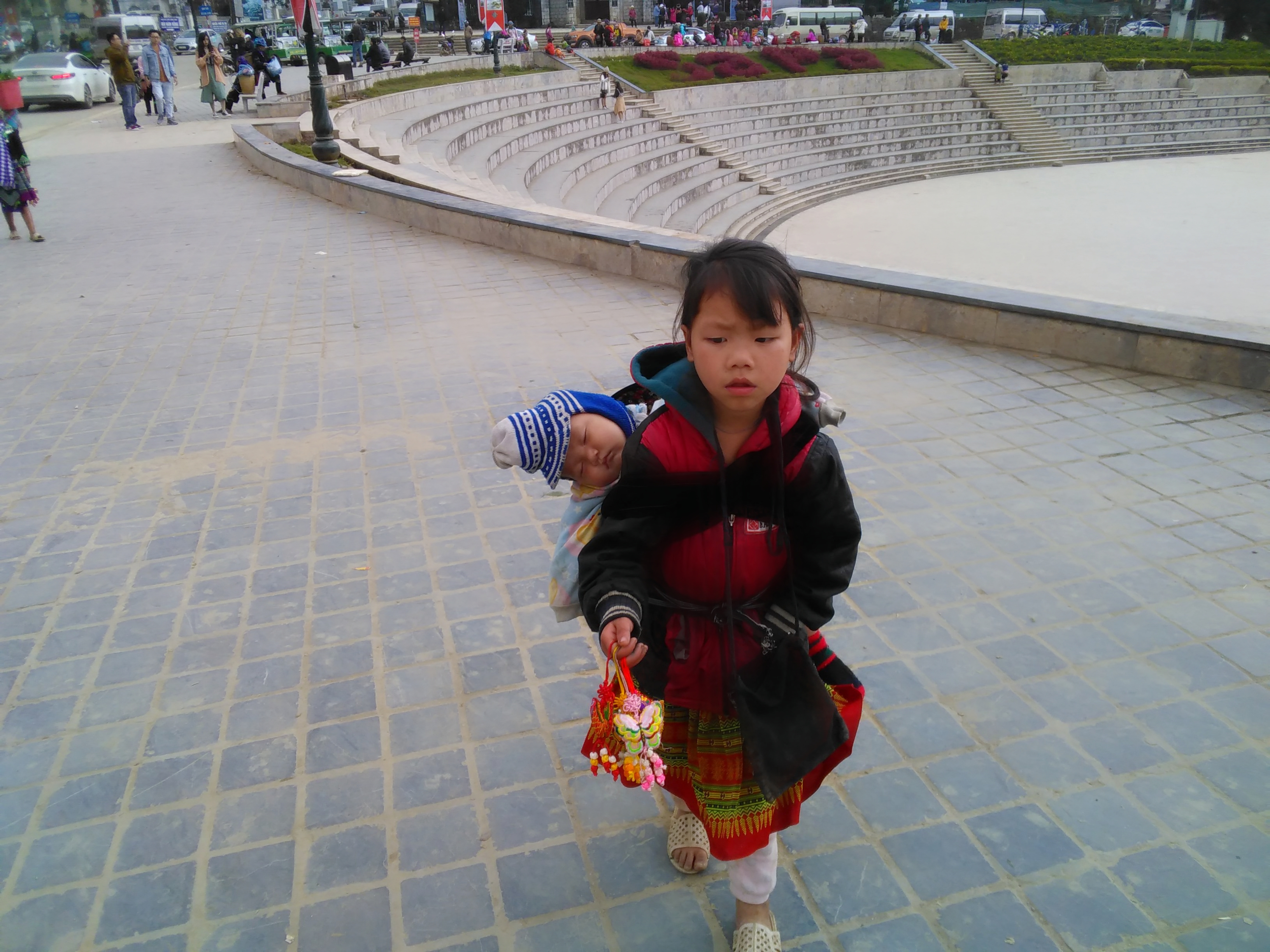
Children in Sa Pa

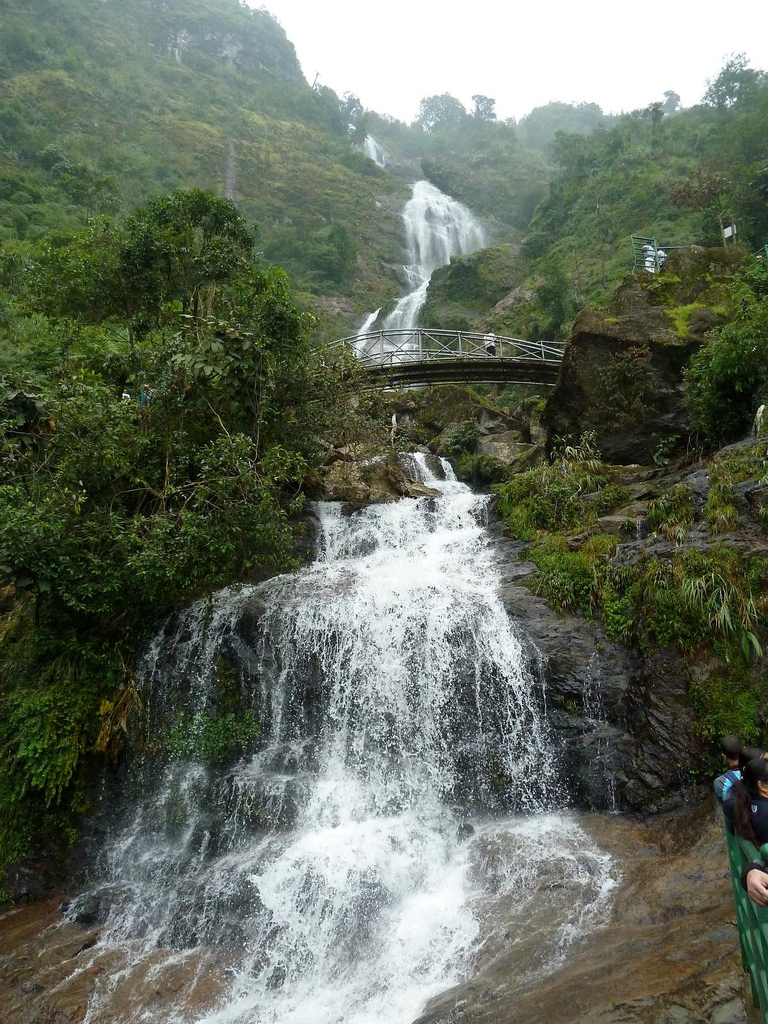
Silver Waterfall, Sa Pa

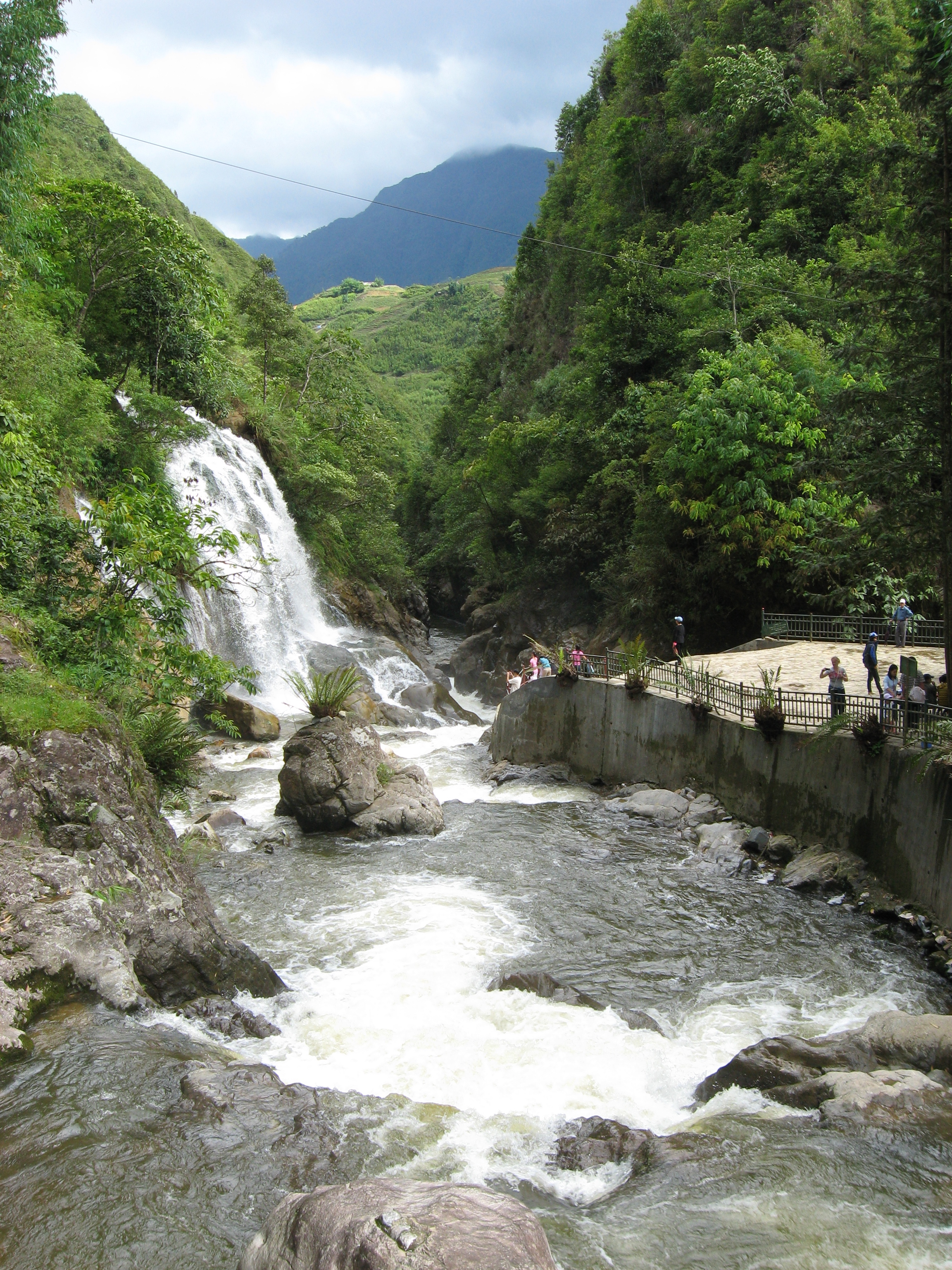
Cát Cát Waterfall, Cát Cát village, Sa Pa

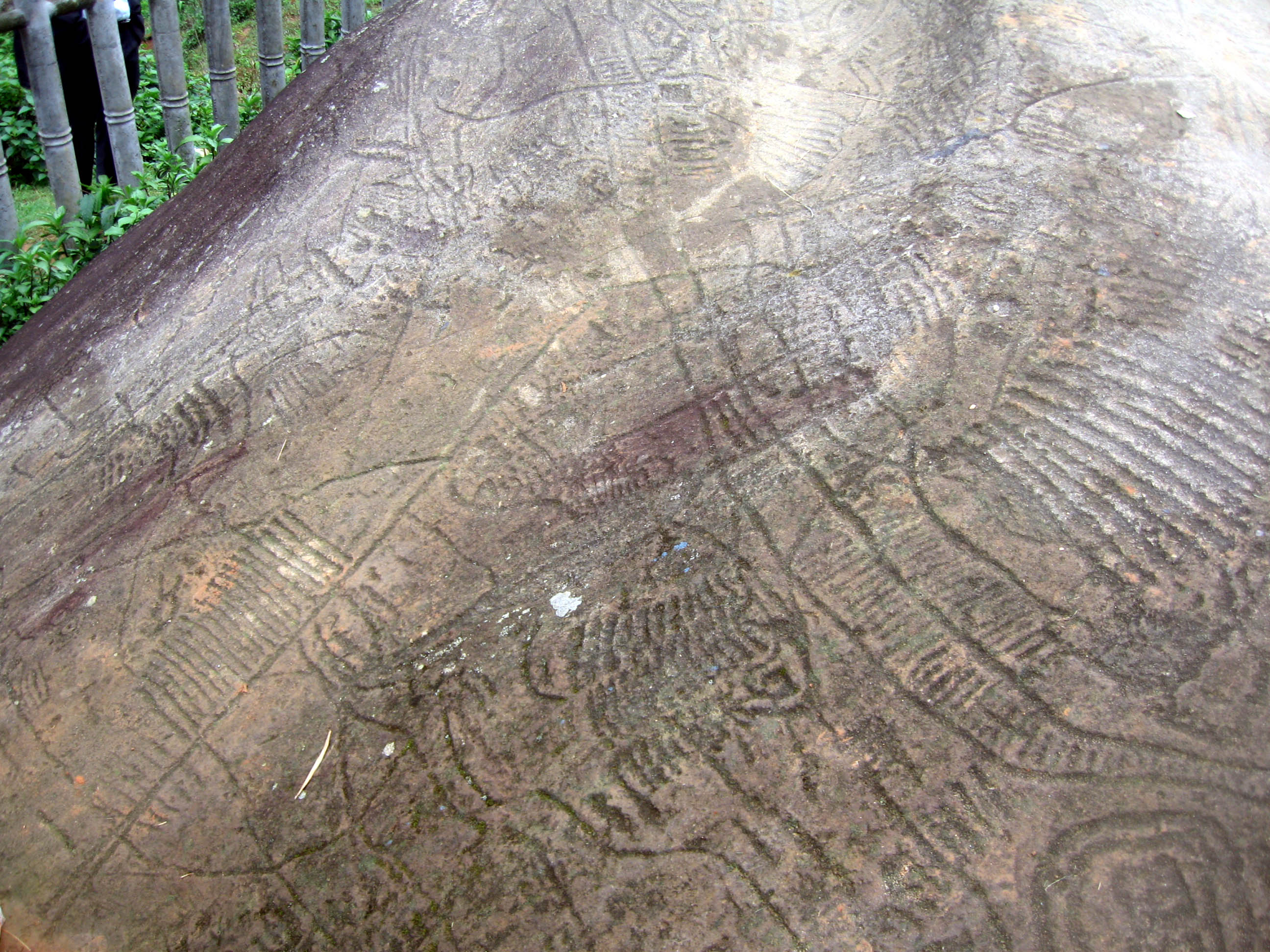
Petroglyphs in Sa Pa

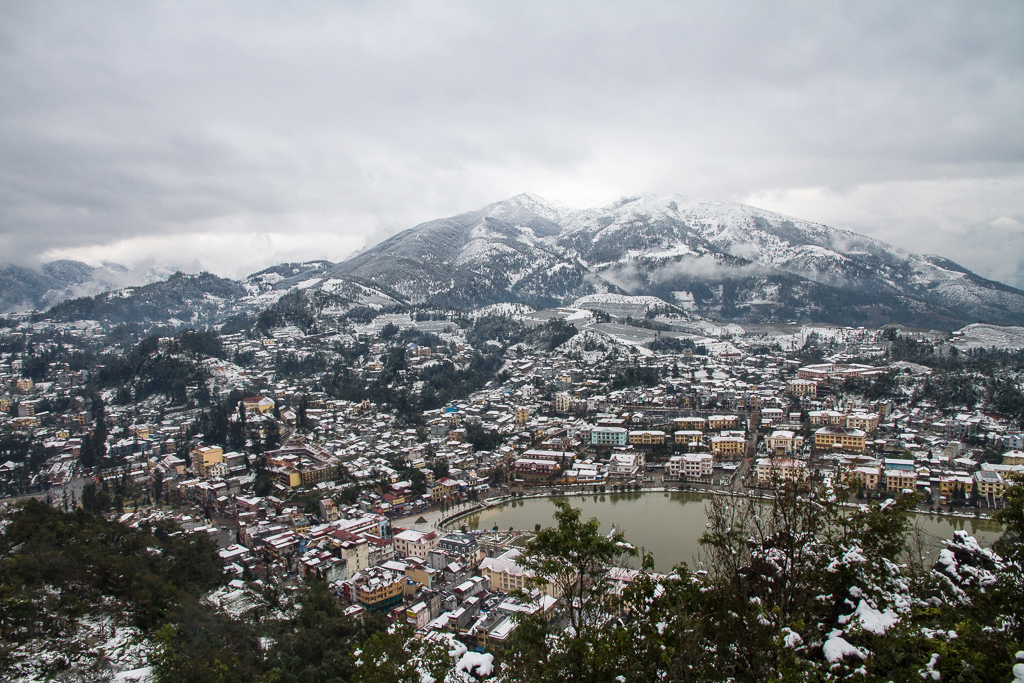
Sa Pa blanketed in snow

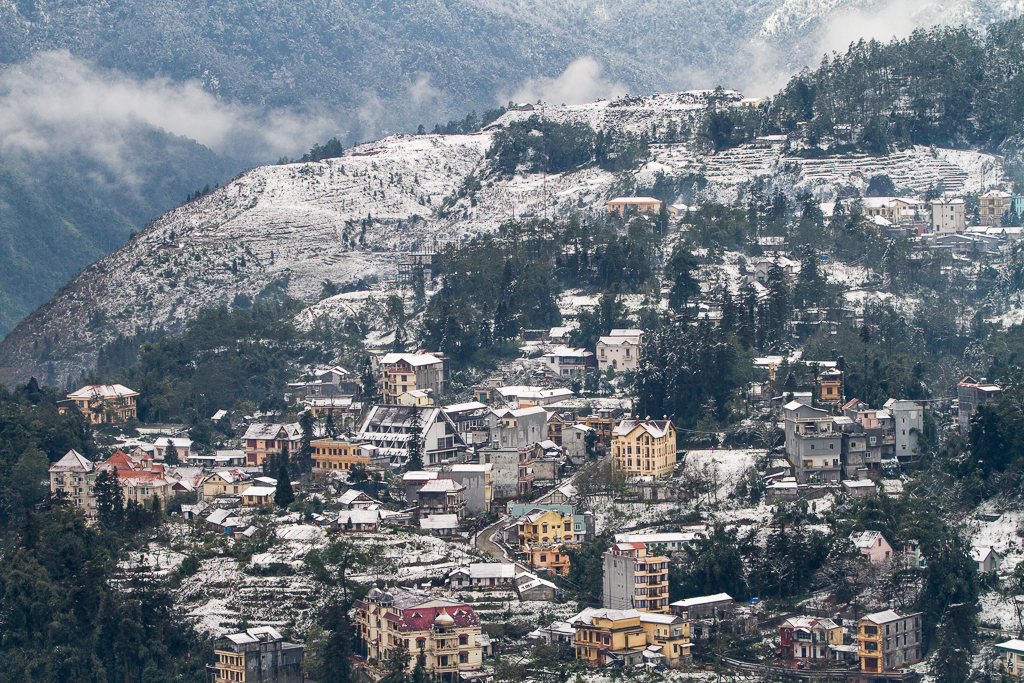
Sa Pa blanketed in snow

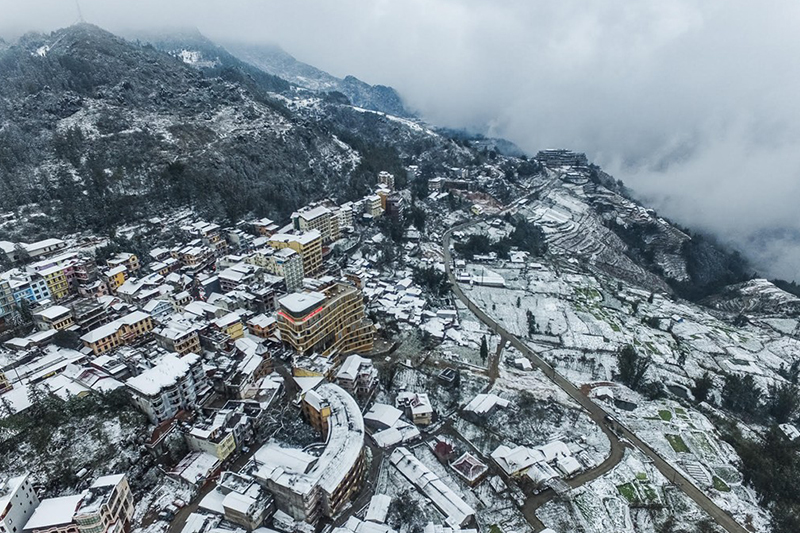
Sa Pa blanketed in snow

== Bibliography ==
- Lao Cai Statistics Office (2023). Lao Cai Statistical Yearbook 2022 (PDF). Hanoi: Statistical Publishing House. ISBN 978-6047524655.
- Forbes, Andrew; Henley, David (2012). "Sapa and the north-west". Vietnam Past and Present: The North. Chiang Mai: Cognoscenti Books. ASIN B006DCCM9Q.
