= Eupithecia pannosa =

Scientific classification
- Kingdom: Animalia
- Phylum: Arthropoda
- Clade: Pancrustacea
- Class: Insecta
- Order: Lepidoptera
- Family: Geometridae
- Genus: Eupithecia
- Species: E. pannosa

Binomial name
- Eupithecia pannosa Mironov & Galsworthy, 2008

Species of moth

Eupithecia pannosa is a moth in the family Geometridae. It is found in Pakistan, northern India, Nepal, and northern Vietnam (Mount Fansipan).

The wingspan is about 19.5–20 mm. Its forewings are dark grey and the hindwings are dirty white in the anterior half and grey in the posterior half along the anal and terminal margins and at the tornus.
