= Tả Phìn (disambiguation) =

Tả Phìn may refer to several places in Vietnam:

- Tả Phìn, a rural commune of Lào Cai province
- Tả Phìn, Điện Biên, a former rural commune of Tủa Chùa district
- Tả Phìn, Hà Giang, a former rural commune of Đồng Văn district
- Tả Phìn, Lai Châu, a former rural commune of Sìn Hồ district
