= Sa Pa (disambiguation) =

Sa Pa may refer to:

- Sa Pa, a district-level town (formerly a rural district) of Lào Cai Province, Vietnam
- Sa Pa ward, a ward of Sa Pa town
- Former Sa Pa township, dissolved in 2019 to form the six new wards of Sa Pa town
