= Sapa Airport =

Coordinates: 22°13′53″N 104°15′47″E

Sapa Airport Cảng hàng không Sapa
- IATA: none; ICAO: unknown

Summary
- Airport type: Public
- Serves: Lao Cai, Sapa
- Location: Bảo Yên District
- Interactive map of Sapa Airport

Runways
Direction	Length		Surface
Direction	ft	m	Surface
14/32	7,874	2,400

Lào Cai Airport or Sapa Airport (Vietnamese language: Sân bay Lào Cai, Sân bay Sapa) is a military/civil facility planned to be constructed in the province of Lào Cai, Vietnam, around 35 km (22 mi) south of Sapa. The airport will be located in the commune of Cam Cọn, Bảo Yên District. The Feasibility Study Report was approved by the Prime Minister on October 21, 2021. The project will be invested in a public-private partnership with a total investment of over VND6,948 billion (around US$305 million). The airport will be in accordance with the 4C standards of the International Civil Aviation Organization and be capable of receiving 1.5 million passengers a year. According to the approved project, the airport will cover an area of 371 hectares (920 acres). The first phase of the project will need 295.2 hectares (729 acres), while the second phase will need an additional 75.8 hectares (187 acres). The construction will be carried out in two phases. The first phase will start from Q4/2021, the Sapa Airport will meet the 4C standards of the International Civil Aviation Organization, once completed will be capable of process 1.5 million passengers per year.

The ground breaking ceremony of Sapa Airport was held on March 3, 2022 marking the start of construction of Sapa Airport. The government expects the construction time to be around 4 years. However, as of early 2026, there was basically no meaningful development and construction regarding the project, with multiple bidding efforts in 2022 and 2025 brought no success.
