= Fansipan =

Tallest mountain in Vietnam

- Phan Xi Păng
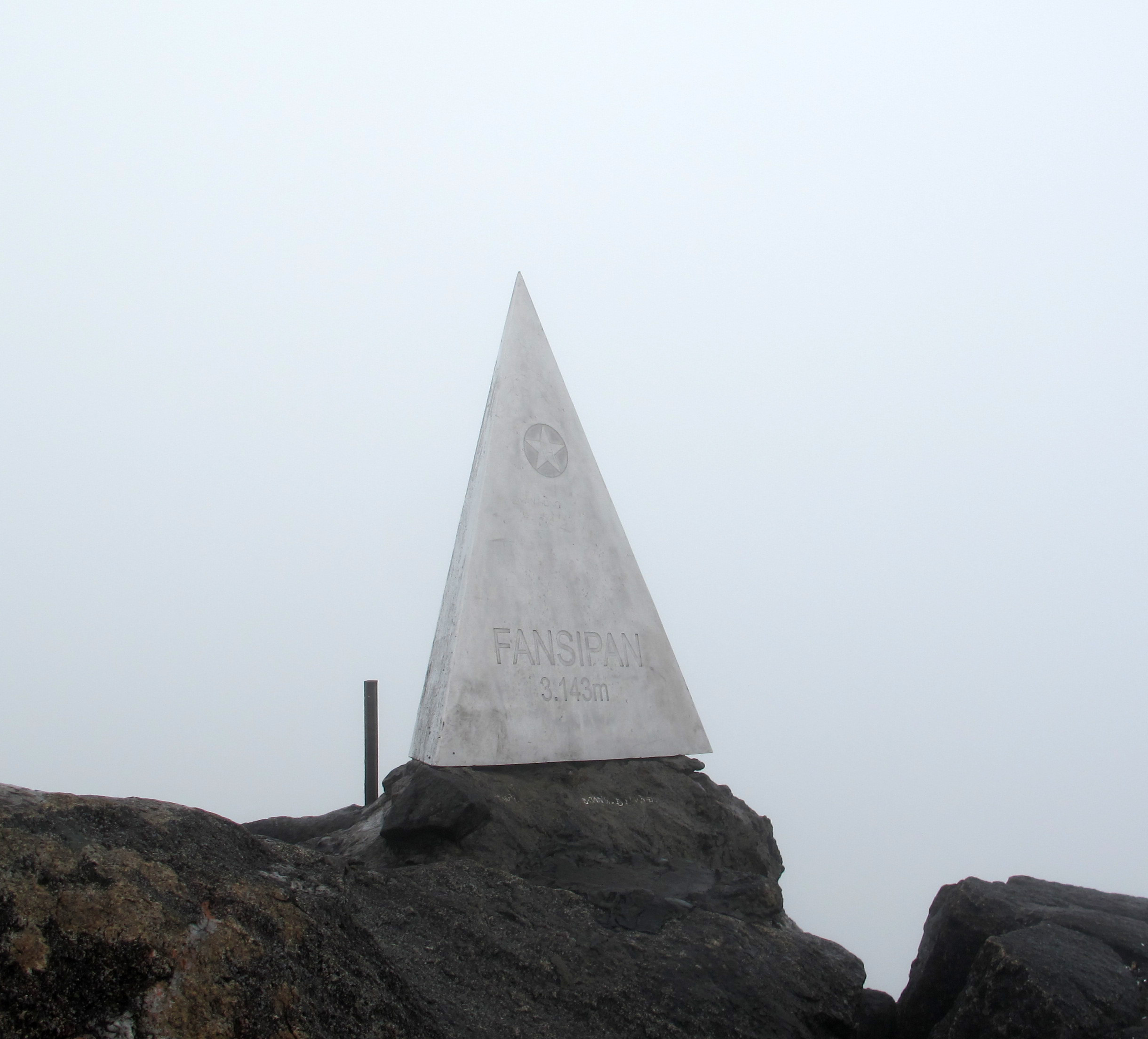
- Monument at the summit of Fansipan

Highest point
- Elevation: 3,147.3 m (10,326 ft)
- Prominence: 1,617 m (5,305 ft)
- Listing: Country high point Ultra; Ribu
- Coordinates: 22°18′12″N 103°46′30″E

Geography
- Location within Vietnam
- Location: Lào Cai Province, Vietnam
- Country: Vietnam
- Region(s): Lai Châu, Lào Cai
- District(s): Tam Đường, Sa Pa

Climbing
- Easiest route: Cable car

Fansipan (Vietnamese: Phan Xi Păng IPA: [fān.ʂī.pɐ̄ŋ],) is a mountain in Vietnam. Its height was originally measured at 3,143 metres (10,312 ft) in 1909, but this value was later adjusted to 3,147.3 metres (10,326 ft). It is the highest mountain on the Indochinese peninsula (comprising Vietnam, Laos, and Cambodia), hence its nickname, "the Roof of Indochina". It is located in the Lào Cai province of the Northwest region of Vietnam, nine kilometres (5 1/2 miles) southwest of Sa Pa, in the Hoang Lien Son mountain range. Administratively, it is shared between Tam Đường District, Lai Châu and Sa Pa town.

== Etymology ==
The origin of the name Phan Xi Păng is unclear. The most commonly accepted theory is that it evolved from Hủa Xi Pan ("the tottering giant rock")—the name that the locals called the mountain, based on its shape. Another theory suggests that the name came from the Hmong people, as it means "azalea mountain" in their language, due to the prevalence of azaleas and other species of the Rhododendron genus on the mountain.

It has also been suggested that the name may be derived from Phan Văn Sơn, a geography official in the Nguyễn dynasty who helped the French map the area and define the border with China in 1905. Due to the inaccurate local pronunciation, the name generally evolved into Phan Xi Păng.

== Geography ==
Fansipan is the tallest mountain in the Hoang Lien Son range, situated on the border of Lào Cai and Lai Châu provinces, with its peak located on the Lào Cai side. The mountain is part of Hoàng Liên National Park. It has a topographic prominence of 1,617 metres (5,305 ft), ranking sixth in Vietnam.

== Geology ==
Fansipan was formed around 250–260 million years ago, between the Permian period in the Paleozoic era and the Triassic period in the Mesozoic. The Himalayan orogeny since Late Mesozoic has further uplifted Fansipan and the Hoang Lien Son range and created the Red River Fault to the east.

== Summit mark ==
The initial metal pyramid was made and installed on the mountain's peak by Soviet engineers from Hòa Bình province, in 1985. The amateur mountaineering expedition was the first since the end of the colonial period and was officially timed to the 40th anniversary of Victory Day of the Soviet Union over Nazi Germany.

== Climbing ==
=== Hiking ===
Fansipan can be climbed in a steep and fairly strenuous hike. Previously, it took about 5–6 days from Sa Pa to reach the peak and return. Now, the total time is usually only about three days, even two, or for experts and strong, healthy people, it can be done in one day.

Tour companies in the area will arrange hikes to the summit that take one to three days. Most recommend taking the two- or three-day options, and few guides will take tourists on a round trip in a single day.

A very small village is located at around 1,500 m (4,920 ft), where accommodation and food is offered. Further up, at 2,800 m (9,190 ft), is an overnight camp. Most booked trips include the use of these facilities in their price, should they be required.

=== Cable car and funiculars ===
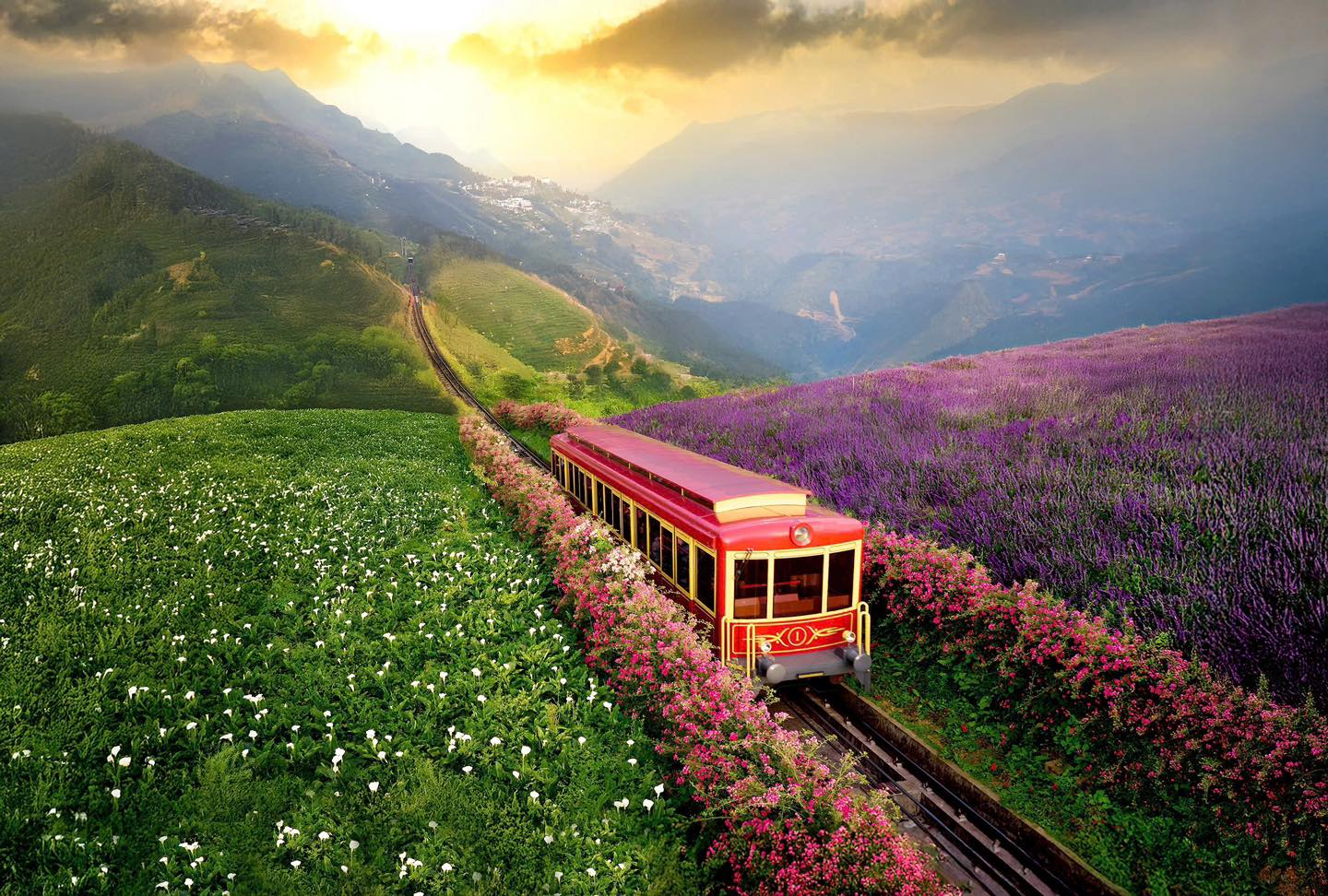
Mường Hoa Funicular car

Funicular and cable car services to the peak of Fansipan are operated by Sun World Fansipan Legend. The journey from Sa Pa has three legs: the Mường Hoa Funicular from Sa Pa Funicular Station to Mường Hoa Funicular Station; the Fansipan cable car from Hoàng Liên Cable Car Station to Fansipan Cable Car Station; and the Fansipan Funicular from Đỗ Quyên Funicular Station to Trúc Mây Funicular Station, near the peak.

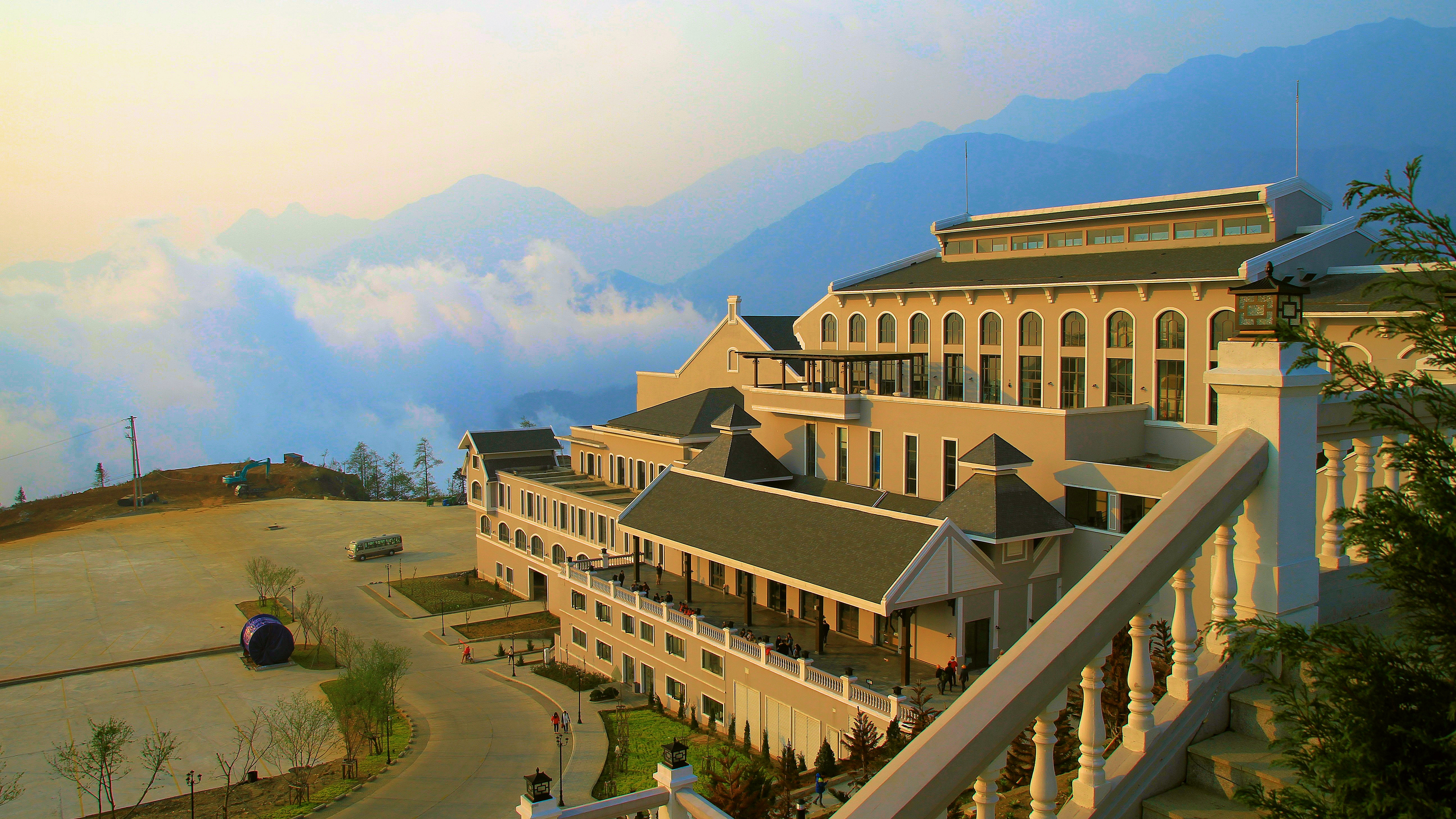
Mường Hoa Funicular Station

The Mường Hoa Funicular operates from Sa Pa Station in Sun World's Sun Plaza department store to the terminus, at Mường Hoa Station, where passengers can connect to the Fansipan cable car. The line opened in March 2018 and spans about 2 kilometres (1.2 mi), making it the longest funicular in Vietnam. The trip takes about six minutes, and the route includes two tunnels and four viaducts. The line and railcars were designed by the Swiss manufacturer Garaventa. The railcars accommodate up to 200 passengers, and the car and station interiors feature 20th-century European designs.

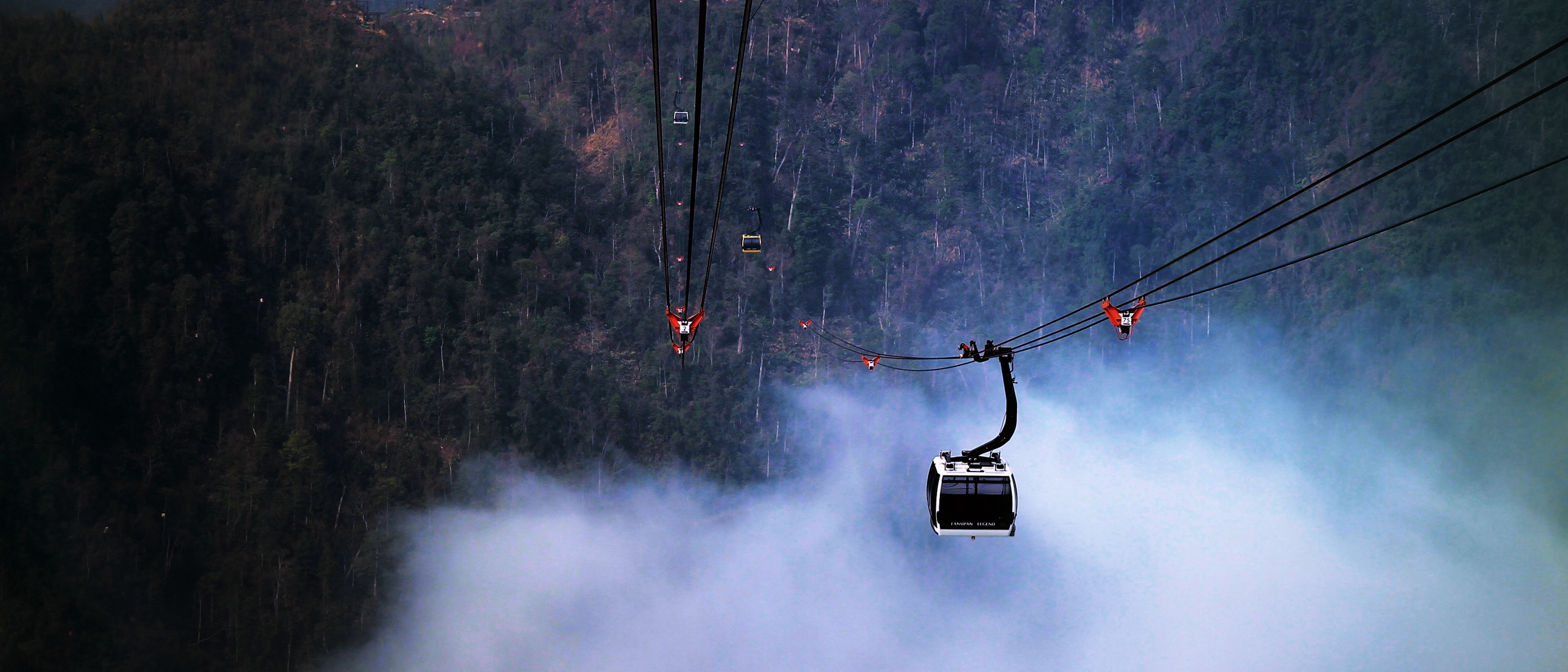
Fansipan cable car

The Fansipan cable car was inaugurated in February 2016. The gondola lift departs from a Hoàng Liên Cable Car Station, near the Mường Hoa Funicular Station, and takes twenty minutes to reach the summit. The service holds two Guinness World Records for the longest nonstop, three-rope cable car in the world, spanning 6.3 km (3 15/16 mi), and the greatest elevation difference by a nonstop, three-roped cable car for the 1,410 m (4,626 ft) difference in elevation between the termini. From the other terminus at Fansipan Cable Car Station, passengers can transfer to the Fansipan Funicular at Đỗ Quyên Funicular Station to reach the mountain peak.

== See also ==
- List of Southeast Asian mountains
- List of ultras of Southeast Asia
- List of elevation extremes by country
