= Tả Phìn =

- Commune
- Terraced rice fields in Tả Phìn commune
- Interactive map of Tả Phìn
- Coordinates: 22.395081838297063°N 103.84292954625036°E
- Country: Vietnam
- Province: Lào Cai
- Region: Northwest
- Seat: Thôn Sả Xéng

Area
  - Total: 74.68 km^{2} (28.83 sq mi)

Population (2025)
  - Total: 9,928
  - Density: 132/km^{2} (340/sq mi)

Tả Phìn is a commune in Lào Cai province, Vietnam.

== History ==
The area of present-day Tả Phìn commune was formerly part of Sa Pa district.

On 11 September 2019, the Standing Committee of the National Assembly of Vietnam issued Resolution No. 767/NQ-UBTVQH14 establishing Sa Pa town from the entire area and population of Sa Pa district. Tả Phìn commune consequently became part of Sa Pa town.

On 16 June 2025:

- The National Assembly of Vietnam adopted Resolution No. 203/2025/QH15 amending and supplementing several articles of the Constitution of the Socialist Republic of Vietnam. Under the resolution, district-level administrative units nationwide ceased to operate from 1 July 2025.
- The Standing Committee of the National Assembly of Vietnam issued Resolution No. 1673/NQ-UBTVQH15 on the reorganization of commune-level administrative units in Lào Cai province in 2025. Under the resolution, a new Tả Phìn commune was established from the former communes of Trung Chải and Tả Phìn.
