= Bảo Yên district =

Coordinates: 22.250°N 104.333°E

Bảo Yên District Huyện Bảo Yên
- District
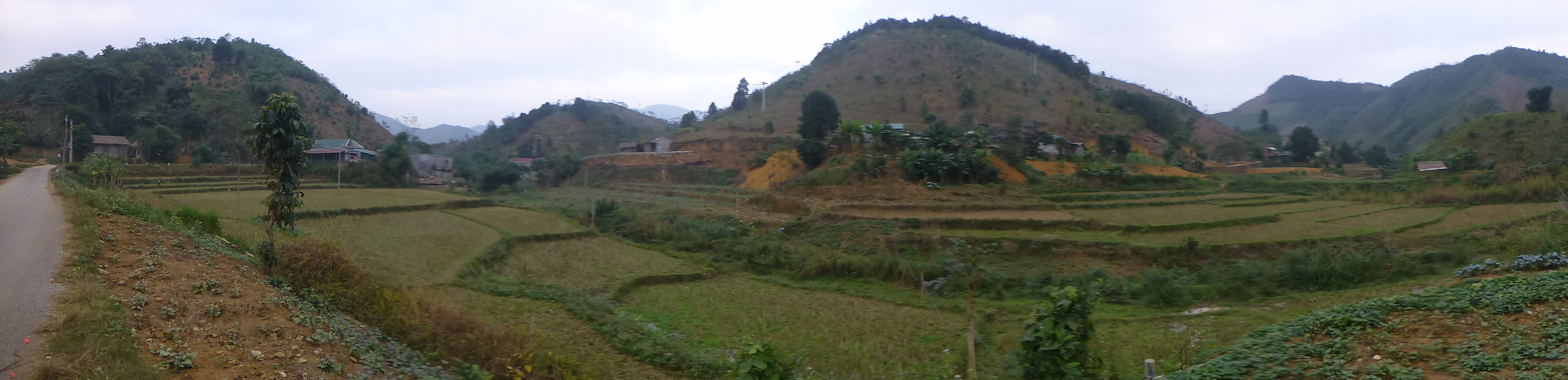
- A landscape in Kim Sơn Rural Commune

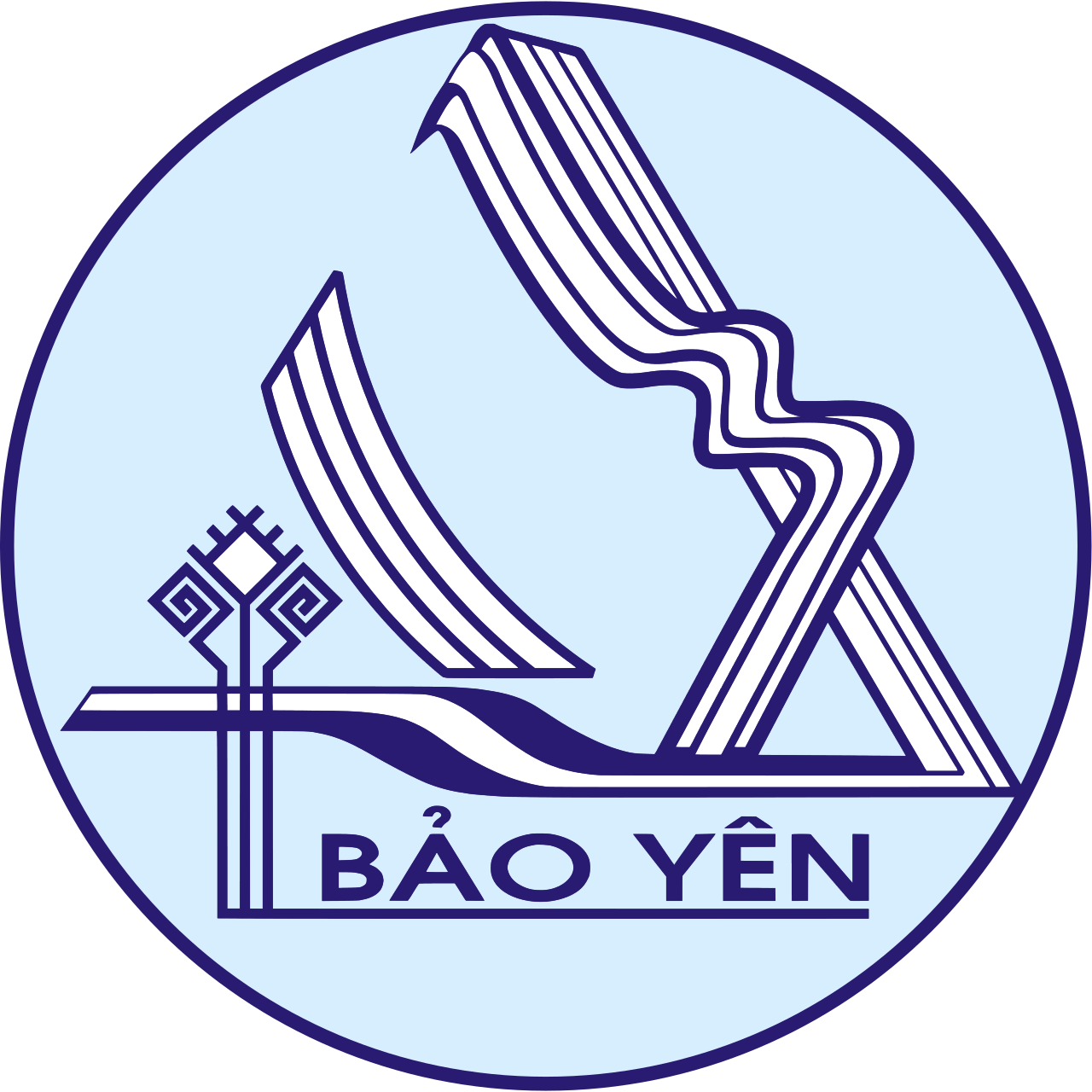
- Seal
- Interactive map of Bảo Yên District
- Country: Vietnam
- Region: Northeast
- Province: Lào Cai
- Capital: Phố Ràng

Area
  - Total: 317 sq mi (821 km^{2})

Population (2003)
  - Total: 73,924
- Time zone: UTC+7 (Indochina Time)

Bảo Yên is a former rural district of Lào Cai province in the Northeast region of Vietnam. As of 2003, the district had a population of 73,924. The district covers an area of 821 km^{2}. The district capital lies at Phố Ràng. The Giáy language is spoken in some parts of the district by local minorities. The planned Sapa Airport will be built in this district.

== Administrative divisions ==
Phố Ràng (district capital), Long Khánh, Long Phúc, Việt Tiến, Lương Sơn, Yên Sơn, Xuân Thượng, Minh Tân, Bảo Hà, Cam Con, Kim Sơn, Điện Quan, Thượng Hà, Tân Dương, Xuân Hòa, Vĩnh Yên, Nghĩa Đô and Tân Tiến.

== Climate ==
Climate data for Phố Ràng, Bảo Yên District
Month	Jan	Feb	Mar	Apr	May	Jun	Jul	Aug	Sep	Oct	Nov	Dec	Year
Mean daily maximum °C (°F)	19.9 (67.8)	20.9 (69.6)	24.4 (75.9)	28.4 (83.1)	31.6 (88.9)	33.0 (91.4)	33.1 (91.6)	32.9 (91.2)	31.6 (88.9)	28.9 (84.0)	25.5 (77.9)	21.9 (71.4)	27.7 (81.9)
Daily mean °C (°F)	15.8 (60.4)	17.2 (63.0)	20.3 (68.5)	24.0 (75.2)	26.8 (80.2)	28.2 (82.8)	28.2 (82.8)	27.7 (81.9)	26.4 (79.5)	23.8 (74.8)	20.3 (68.5)	16.6 (61.9)	23.0 (73.4)
Mean daily minimum °C (°F)	13.7 (56.7)	15.1 (59.2)	17.9 (64.2)	21.3 (70.3)	23.6 (74.5)	25.2 (77.4)	25.3 (77.5)	24.9 (76.8)	23.6 (74.5)	21.3 (70.3)	17.8 (64.0)	14.0 (57.2)	20.3 (68.5)
Average precipitation mm (inches)	30.6 (1.20)	38.4 (1.51)	61.9 (2.44)	130.2 (5.13)	191.4 (7.54)	199.0 (7.83)	250.2 (9.85)	330.7 (13.02)	201.3 (7.93)	107.4 (4.23)	47.7 (1.88)	21.5 (0.85)	1,625.6 (64.00)
Average rainy days	9.0	9.3	11.5	14.3	16.1	15.7	18.2	18.7	14.4	10.7	8.0	5.9	151.6
Average relative humidity (%)	86.6	86.1	84.6	84.0	82.9	83.6	85.2	86.6	87.0	87.2	86.6	85.8	85.4
Mean monthly sunshine hours	57.4	56.0	76.4	118.9	159.5	152.4	169.4	174.9	156.0	121.0	127.2	98.3	1,473.2
Source: Vietnam Institute for Building Science and Technology
