= Abies delavayi subsp. fansipanensis =

Conservation status
- Critically Endangered (IUCN 3.1)

Scientific classification
- Kingdom: Plantae
- Clade: Tracheophytes
- Clade: Gymnospermae
- Division: Pinophyta
- Class: Pinopsida
- Order: Pinales
- Family: Pinaceae
- Genus: Abies
- Species: A. delavayi
- Subspecies: A. d. subsp. fansipanensis

Trinomial name
- Abies delavayi subsp. fansipanensis (Q.P.Xiang, L.K.Fu & Nan Li) Rushforth

Synonyms
- Abies fansipanensis Q.P.Xiang, L.K.Fu & Nan Li

Subspecies of conifer

Abies delavayi subsp. fansipanensis, also known as the Fansipan fir, is a subspecies of fir tree in the family Pinaceae. It is endemic to northern Vietnam.

== Status ==
It is listed as critically endangered by the IUCN.
