= Tam Đường district =

Coordinates: 22°19′22″N 103°37′38″E

Tam Đường District Huyện Tam Đường
- District
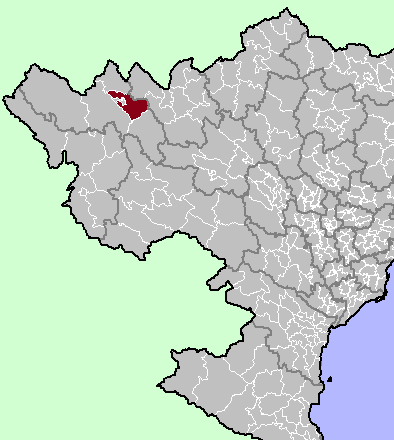
- District location in northern Vietnam
- Country: Vietnam
- Region: Northwest
- Province: Lai Châu
- Capital: Tam Đường

Area
  - Total: 662.92 km^{2} (255.95 sq mi)

Population (2020)
  - Total: 52,470
  - Density: 79.15/km^{2} (205.0/sq mi)
- Time zone: UTC+7 (Indochina Time)
- Website: tamduong.laichau.gov.vn

Tam Đường is a former rural district of Lai Châu province in the Northwest region of Vietnam. The city borders Phong Thổ district, Sìn Hồ district, Tân Uyên district, Lai Châu and Lào Cai province.

The district capital lies at Tam Đường.

== Demographics ==
As of 2020 the city had a population of 52,470, covering an area of 662.92 km^{2}.

== Administrative divisions ==
Lai Châu City is officially divided into 13 commune-level sub-divisions, including the township of Tam Đường and 12 rural communes (Bản Bo, Bản Giang, Bản Hon, Bình Lư, Giang Ma, Hồ Thầu, Khun Há, Nà Tăm, Nùng Nàng, Sơn Bình, Tả Lèng, Thèn Sin).

== Climate ==
Climate data for Tam Dương, elevation 900 m (3,000 ft)
| Month | Jan | Feb | Mar | Apr | May | Jun | Jul | Aug | Sep | Oct | Nov | Dec | Year |
|---|---|---|---|---|---|---|---|---|---|---|---|---|---|
| Record high °C (°F) | 28.7 (83.7) | 31.2 (88.2) | 34.0 (93.2) | 35.2 (95.4) | 36.6 (97.9) | 32.4 (90.3) | 33.0 (91.4) | 33.4 (92.1) | 33.3 (91.9) | 33.2 (91.8) | 29.7 (85.5) | 28.0 (82.4) | 36.6 (97.9) |
| Mean daily maximum °C (°F) | 18.8 (65.8) | 21.0 (69.8) | 24.4 (75.9) | 27.0 (80.6) | 27.5 (81.5) | 27.0 (80.6) | 26.8 (80.2) | 27.5 (81.5) | 27.0 (80.6) | 25.1 (77.2) | 22.1 (71.8) | 19.3 (66.7) | 24.5 (76.0) |
| Daily mean °C (°F) | 13.6 (56.5) | 15.4 (59.7) | 18.7 (65.7) | 21.4 (70.5) | 22.7 (72.9) | 23.1 (73.6) | 22.9 (73.2) | 23.1 (73.6) | 22.2 (72.0) | 20.2 (68.4) | 16.9 (62.4) | 13.9 (57.0) | 19.5 (67.1) |
| Mean daily minimum °C (°F) | 10.1 (50.2) | 11.4 (52.5) | 14.3 (57.7) | 17.2 (63.0) | 19.3 (66.7) | 20.7 (69.3) | 20.6 (69.1) | 20.4 (68.7) | 19.2 (66.6) | 17.0 (62.6) | 13.5 (56.3) | 10.3 (50.5) | 16.2 (61.2) |
| Record low °C (°F) | 0.8 (33.4) | 3.2 (37.8) | 2.9 (37.2) | 7.9 (46.2) | 11.9 (53.4) | 15.0 (59.0) | 16.9 (62.4) | 17.0 (62.6) | 12.7 (54.9) | 7.2 (45.0) | 4.0 (39.2) | −0.4 (31.3) | −0.4 (31.3) |
| Average rainfall mm (inches) | 40.1 (1.58) | 39.0 (1.54) | 81.2 (3.20) | 185.1 (7.29) | 340.4 (13.40) | 472.5 (18.60) | 545.2 (21.46) | 340.0 (13.39) | 186.2 (7.33) | 131.9 (5.19) | 75.3 (2.96) | 35.1 (1.38) | 2,469 (97.20) |
| Average rainy days | 7.2 | 7.0 | 8.4 | 14.0 | 21.9 | 25.2 | 26.3 | 23.0 | 16.3 | 12.5 | 8.2 | 5.1 | 175.0 |
| Average relative humidity (%) | 81.2 | 77.0 | 73.0 | 75.9 | 81.3 | 87.2 | 89.0 | 87.6 | 86.0 | 84.3 | 82.3 | 81.7 | 82.2 |
| Mean monthly sunshine hours | 161.5 | 167.0 | 189.3 | 204.3 | 186.4 | 114.5 | 117.2 | 145.2 | 157.6 | 156.4 | 164.1 | 168.0 | 1,936.8 |
Source: Vietnam Institute for Building Science and Technology
