= Sa Pa =

Sa Pa Phường Sa Pa
- Ward
- Sa Pa Ward
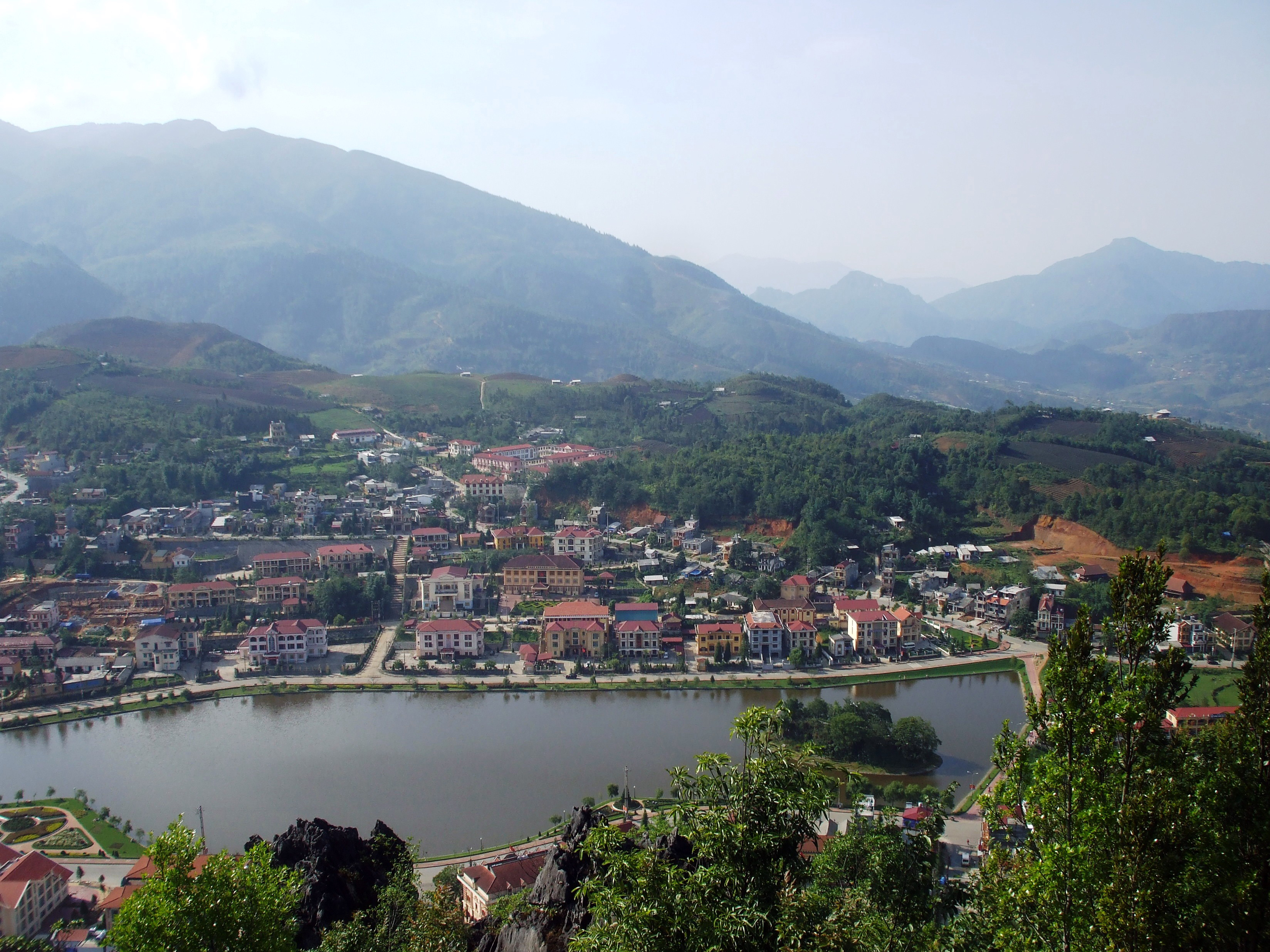
- Sa Pa town Cầu Mây Alley Quang Trường Square Sa Pa Station Sa Pa Stone Church Sa Pa

- Location of Sa Pa in Vietnam
- Coordinates: 22°20′8″N 103°50′31″E
- Country: Vietnam
- Province: Lào Cai

Area
  - Total: 6.25 km^{2} (2.41 sq mi)

Population (2019)
  - Total: 9,412
  - Density: 1.506/km^{2} (3.90/sq mi)

Sa Pa or Sapa is a ward of Lào Cai Province in Northwest Vietnam. Prior to July 2025, it was a frontier township and capital of the former Sa Pa District.

The Standing Committee of the National Assembly enacted Resolution No. 1673 on the arrangement of commune-level administrative units in Lào Cai Province in 2025. Accordingly, the entire natural area and population of the wards of Hàm Rồng, Ô Quý Hồ, Sa Pả, Cầu Mây, Phan Si Păng and Sa Pa (Sa Pa Town) were reorganized to form a new ward named Sa Pa Ward.

== Names ==
The name historically used by locals for this area is Sa Pả, meaning "sand beach". Over time, as foreigners moved in as the dominant residents, the name Sapa (pronounced without tone accents) became more common.

== Geography ==
Sa Pa is located in Lao Cai province, approximately 300 kilometers northwest of Hanoi, bordering China to the north.

Sa Pa lies on the Lo Suoi Tung plateau along the Hoang Lien Son mountain range of Northwest Vietnam. The surrounding region is notable for its high mountain peaks, including Mount Fansipan, the highest peak in Vietnam, located nine kilometers southwest of Sa Pa.

The terrain around Sa Pa is steep and highly dissected, with high mountains and hills separated by valleys that drain toward the Red River. Across Lao Cai Province, slopes steeper than 25 degrees cover roughly 80 percent of the land, creating scattered plots of cultivatable land. Local drainage is provided by two tributaries of the Red River, the Ngòi Bo and the Ngòi Ðum.

Sa Pa has a cool highland climate, with average temperatures of about 15–16 degrees celsius. Winter temperatures occasionally fall below freezing, and snow has been reocrded at elevations around 1,571 meters. Annual rainfall is 2,000–2,500 millimeters, considerably higher than in other northern Vietnamese provinces (about 1,700 mm). Most of this falls during the rainy season from April to September, which accounts for an estimated 70 to 80 percent of yearly precipitation and can cause flooding, particularly between June and early September. The dry season runs from October to March. The cold winters and dry season limit rice cultivation to a single crop per year during the rainy season.

Four main soil types occur in the area, dictated largely by altitude. High-mountain yellow-red humus soils, found at 700–1,700 meters, are the most widespread, covering about 65 percent of the direct and supporting forest trees, fruit trees and medicinal herbs. High-mountain humus soils above 1,700 meters (about 18 percent) have limited agricultural potential, while feralitic soils on sandstone (400–700 meters) and those formed by wet-rice cultivation together make up a small share. As of 2003, about three quarters of the ward's land was classified as forested, but only 48.5 percent of the district's total area was actually under tree cover, as much of the classified forest land was bare or degraded.

== History ==
In French-ruled Indochina, Sa Pa was originally settled as a hill resort station by colonialists, who deemed the cool, high-altitude plateau climate ideal for escaping the heat. Settlers equipped the town with railways and European-style hotels and villas to suit the preferences of the elite class, functionally operating as a European enclave. Sapa Church was built in 1925. Between 1938 and 1939, approximately 3,000 tourists visited the site.

Tourism halted during the First Indochina War, and in 1951 French forces bombed the town, destroying most of the previously constructed buildings. In 1991, after Vietnam opened up to a market economy, tourism began to trickle back into Sa Pa.

== Economy ==
Lao Cai province identified tourism as a key economic sector. In 2002, 80 hotels were built, and the area welcomed from 75,000 visitors in 2002 to 720,000 visitors in 2013.

According to Agoda's ranking in Jan. 2026, Sa Pa has emerged as the fastest growing destination for international tourism in Asia.
