= Tiến Thắng (disambiguation) =

Tiến Thắng is a commune of Hanoi.

Tiến Thắng may also refer to:

- Tiến Thắng, Hà Nam, a former commune of Lý Nhân district
- Tiến Thắng, Bắc Giang, a former commune of Yên Thế district

== See also ==
- Tiên Thắng, a commune of Tiên Lãng district in Haiphong
