= Tiên Lãng =

- Commune
- Interactive map of Tiên Lãng
- Coordinates: 20.72531190285056°N 106.55434893493629°E
- Country: Vietnam
- Region: Red River Delta
- Municipality: Hai Phong
- Established: 16 June 2025

Area
  - Total: 27.89 km^{2} (10.77 sq mi)

Population (2025)
  - Total: 40,446
  - Density: 1,450/km^{2} (3,800/sq mi)
- Website: tienlang.haiphong.gov.vn

Tiên Lãng is a commune in the municipality of Hai Phong, Vietnam.

== History ==
Tiên Lãng Commune was formerly located in Tiên Lãng district, Hai Phong.

On 16 June 2025, the Standing Committee of the National Assembly of Vietnam issued a resolution on the arrangement of commune-level administrative units in Hai Phong in 2025. Under the resolution, the entire area and population of Tiên Lãng Township and Quyết Tiến, Tiên Thanh, and Khởi Nghĩa communes were merged to form a new commune named Tiên Lãng.

According to the proposal for the arrangement of commune-level administrative units in Hai Phong in 2025, Tiên Lãng Commune was established from:

- The entire area of 7.12 km^{2} and population of 18,036 of Tiên Lãng Township;
- The entire area of 9.02 km^{2} and population of 8,707 of Quyết Tiến Commune;
- The entire area of 6.30 km^{2} and population of 6,804 of Tiên Thanh Commune;
- The entire area of 5.45 km^{2} and population of 6,899 of Khởi Nghĩa Commune.

Tiên Lãng Commune has a natural area of 27.89 km^{2} (132.81% of the prescribed standard) and a population of 40,446 (252.79% of the prescribed standard).

On 29 June 2026, the People's Council of Tiên Lãng Commune issued Resolution No. 18/NQ-HĐND on the arrangement and reorganization of hamlets in Tiên Lãng Commune. Under the resolution, Tiên Lãng Commune has 16 hamlets: An Tử, Cộng Hòa, Cựu Đôi, Đông Cầu, Khởi Nghĩa, Kim Đới, Ngọc Hà, Ninh Duy, Phú Kê, Quyết Tiến, Thanh Khê, Tiên Tiến, Tiên Thanh, Triều Đông, Trung Lăng Đông, and Trung Lăng Tây.
