= Việt Tiến (disambiguation) =

Việt Tiến may refer to several places in Vietnam, including:

- Việt Tiến, a commune of Hưng Yên province
- Việt Tiến, Haiphong, a former rural commune of Vĩnh Bảo district.
- Việt Tiến, Bắc Giang, a former rural commune of Việt Yên.
- Việt Tiến, Hà Tĩnh, a former rural commune of Thạch Hà district.
- Việt Tiến, Lào Cai, a former rural commune of Bảo Yên district.
