= Thủy Nguyên (city) =

Location in Haiphong, Vietnam

Coordinates: 20.933°N 106.667°E

Thủy Nguyên Giang Nam Triệu
- Municipal city (Class-3)
- City of Thủy Nguyên; Thành phố Thủy Nguyên
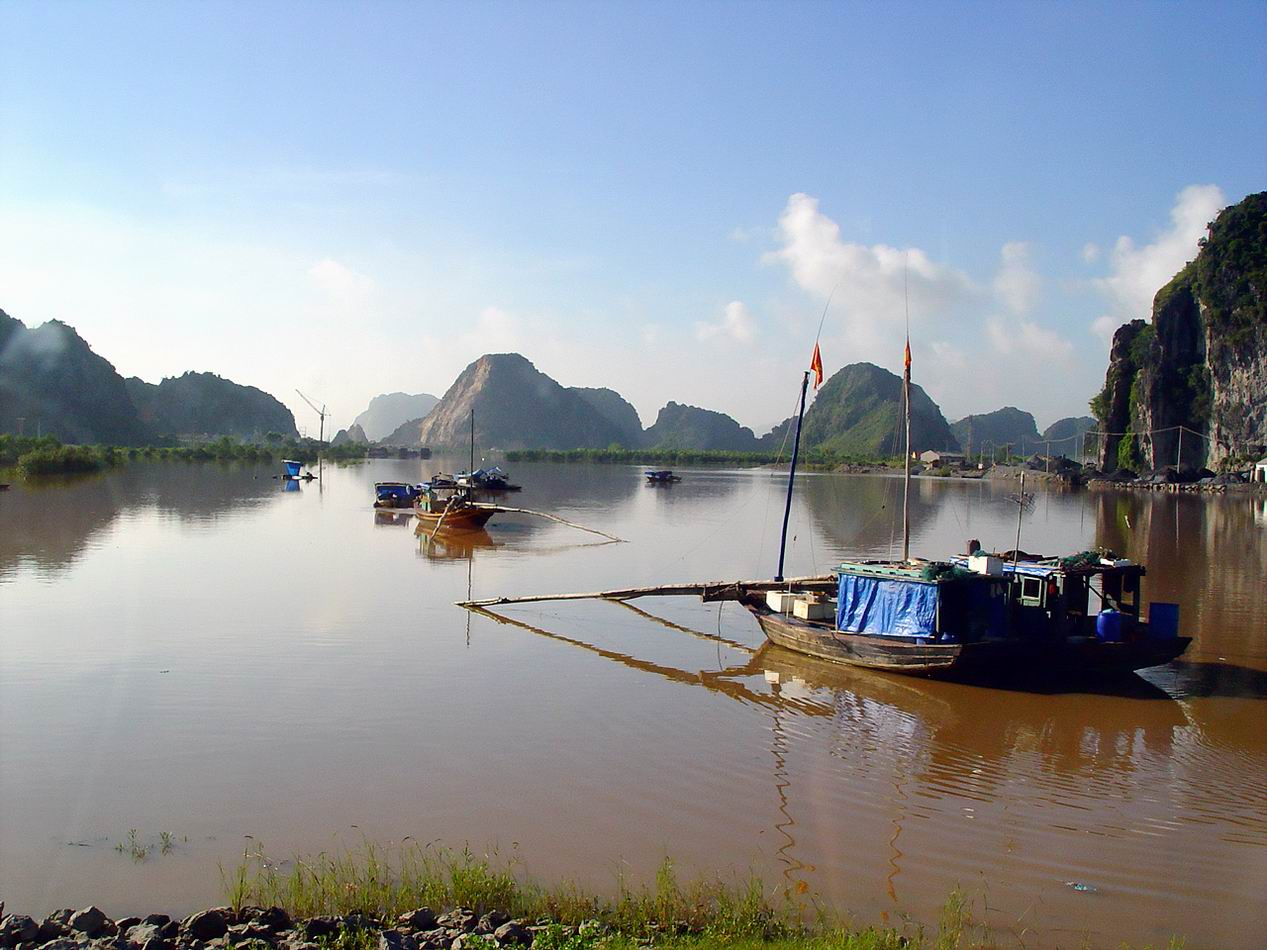
- Bạch Đằng River, section flowing through Thủy Nguyên city, Haiphong

- Location of in Vietnam Thủy Nguyên (Southeast Asia) Thủy Nguyên (Asia)
- Country: Vietnam
- Region: Red River Delta
- City: Haiphong
- Seat: Thủy Đường
- Subdivision: 17 wards, 4 rural communes

Government
  - Secretary of the Party: Phạm Văn Thép
  - Chairman of People's Council: Nguyễn Thành Lung
  - Chairman of People's Committee: Nguyễn Huy Hoàng

Area
  - Municipal city (Class-3): 269.10 km^{2} (103.90 sq mi)

Population (2024)
  - Municipal city (Class-3): 570,000
  - Density: 2,100/km^{2} (5,500/sq mi)
  - Urban: 450,000

Ethnic groups
- Time zone: UTC+07:00 (ICT)
- Website: thuynguyen.haiphong.gov.vn

Thủy Nguyên was a municipal city (sub-city) of Haiphong, the third largest municipality of Vietnam. The city is located near Quảng Ninh and Hạ Long Bay, close to the Tiên Lãng International Airport.

== Geography ==
The city was established on 1 January 2025 from the old Thủy Nguyên district. The Bạch Đằng River flows through Thủy Nguyên, and the Bính Bridge crosses the Cấm River and connects the district with the city of Hai Phong.

=== Administration ===
Thủy Nguyên is subdivided into:

- 17 wards as An Lư, Dương Quan, Hoa Động, Hòa Bình, Hoàng Lâm, Lập Lễ, Lê Hồng Phong, Lưu Kiếm, Nam Triệu Giang, Phạm Ngũ Lão, Minh Đức, Quảng Thanh, Tam Hưng, Thiên Hương, Thủy Đường, Thủy Hà, Trần Hưng Đạo.
- 4 communes as Bạch Đằng, Liên Xuân, Ninh Sơn, Quang Trung.

== See also ==
- Hải An district
