= Vĩnh Bảo district =

Coordinates: 20.700°N 106.467°E

Vĩnh Bảo district Huyện Vĩnh Bảo Vĩnh Lại huyện
- Rural District
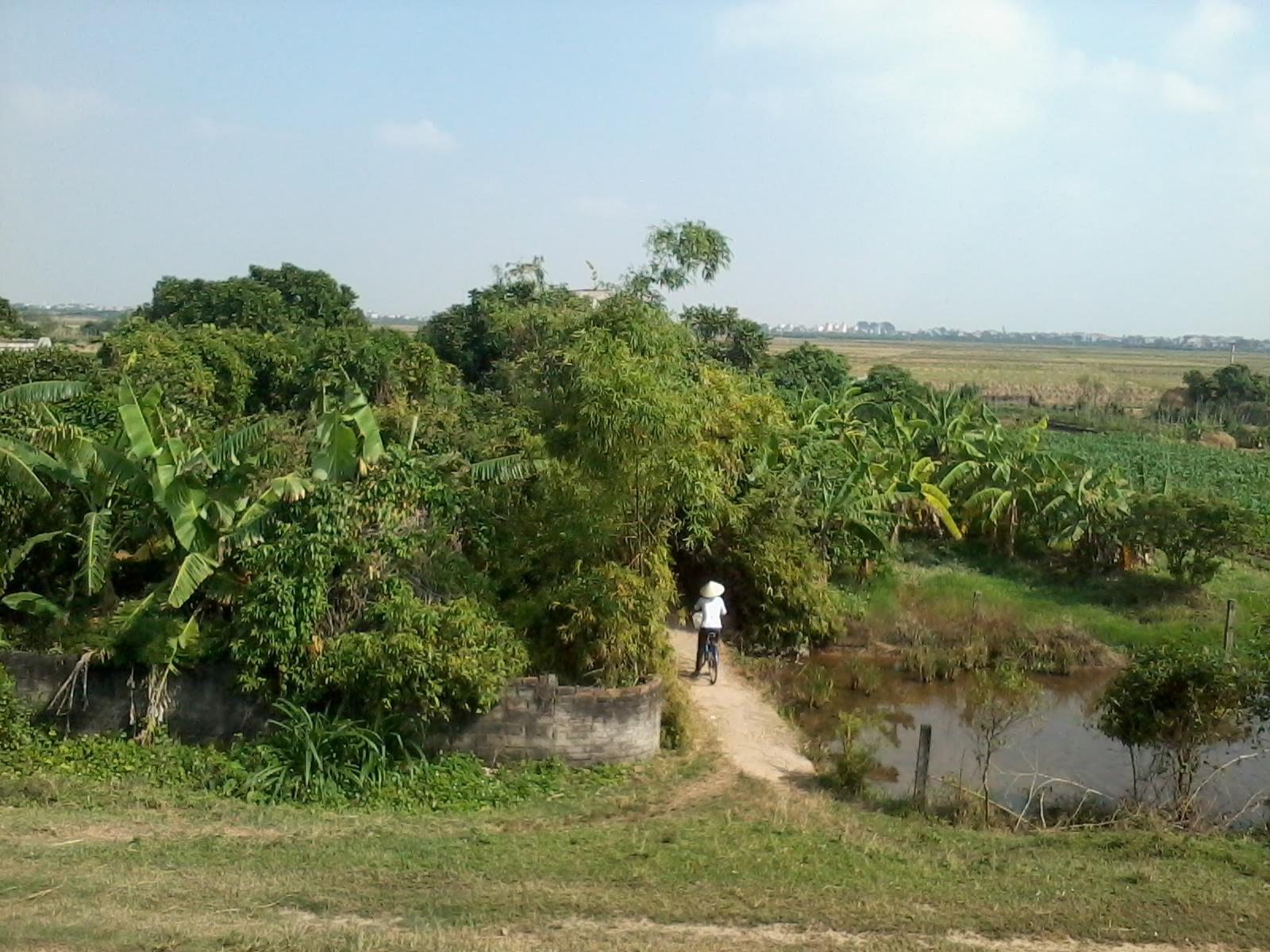
- A banana forest on a dike section of the Thái Bình River in autumn 2012.
- Interactive map of Vĩnh Bảo district
- Country: Vietnam
- Region: Red River Delta
- Municipality (Class-I): Hải Phòng
- Existence: 1838 to August 30, 2025
- Central hall: MFRJ+6GX, National Highway 10, Vĩnh Lạc township

Government
  - Type: Rural district
  - People Committee's Chairman: Nguyễn Đức Cảnh
  - People Council's Chairman: Bùi Gia Huấn
  - Front Committee's Chairman: Phạm Ngọc Quỳnh
  - Party Committee's Secretary: Nguyễn Hoàng Long

Area
  - Total: 183.16 km^{2} (70.72 sq mi)

Population (December 31, 2022)
  - Total: 224,813
  - Density: 1,227/km^{2} (3,180/sq mi)
  - Ethnicities: Kinh; Tanka
- Time zone: UTC+7 (Indochina Time)
- ZIP code: 4000–05000–05300 (Note: An official code from December 31, 2022, to 2025.)
- Website: Vinhbao.Haiphong.gov.vn; Vinhbao.Haiphong.dcs.vn

Vĩnh Bảo [vïʔïŋ˧˥:ɓa̰ːw˧˩˧] is a former rural district of Hải Phòng, the third largest city of Vietnam.

== Geography ==
Currently, Vĩnh Bảo rural district is divided into 20 commune-level administrative units.

- 1 municipality : Vĩnh Lạc capital-township.
- 19 communes : Cao Minh, Dzũng Tiến, Giang Biên, Hòa Bình, Hùng Tiến, Liên Am, Lý Học, Tam Cường, Tân Hưng, Tân Liên, Thắng Thủy, Tiền Phong, Trấn Dương, Trung Lập, Việt Tiến, Vĩnh An, Vĩnh Hải, Vĩnh Hòa, Vĩnh Hưng.

=== Topography ===
Vĩnh Bảo rural district is located in the Southern and about 40 km from the center of Hải Phòng city. Its surface is almost flat and not very high compared to sea level, therefore, that problem has made it difficult for living every time to enter the rainy season. Besides, Vĩnh Bảo is also the intersection of the three largest rivers in the Northeast Vietnam : Luộc, Hóa and Thái Bình. In particular, the water power of Thái Bình River is very large, so it is considered as one of the causes of serious flooding.

Up to now, Vĩnh Lạc township is the most important traffic hub of the whole district, where is run by large roads such as : Provincial routes of 18 Tháng 3 and 20 Tháng 8, Nguyễn Bỉnh Khiêm road (or called as National Highway 37), especially National Highway 10.

=== Population ===
According to the statistics of the Central Steering Committee of the General Census for the Population and Housing (Note: Ban chỉ-đạo Tổng điều-tra Dân-số và Nhà-ở Trung-ương, Chính-phủ Việt-nam.) on December 31, 2022, the total population of Vĩnh Bảo rural district reached 224,813. In particular, all people are registered as Kẻ Kinh.

== Culture ==
The soil cannonball contest (hội thi pháo đất) has been a tradition of Vĩnh Bảo rural district, which has been recorded by Đại Việt sử ký toàn thư since the XVII century. It is always held on the first day of the Lunar New Year to honor agriculture and pray for the new year by farmers.

== Economy ==
Vĩnh Bảo rural district is the only locality not bordering the sea in Hải Phòng, but because of the interlaced river system, it has been known as the key agricultural area of the city. With 70% of the land area to serve agriculture, it has been self-reliant to build from 70 to 80 agricultural extension models.

In the past, Vĩnh Bảo and Tiên Lãng were two localities with their tradition of processing pipe tobacco (thuốc lào), even during the war and subsidy, they were considered as strategic items. Therefore, these two localities were Vietnamese government allowing some autonomies of production, which has been considered prohibition before the 1990s. However, when the market economy has begun to crept into Vietnam society, the status of Vĩnh Bảo pipe tobacco brand was increasingly low. The locality has gradually shifted to the diversification of the economy.

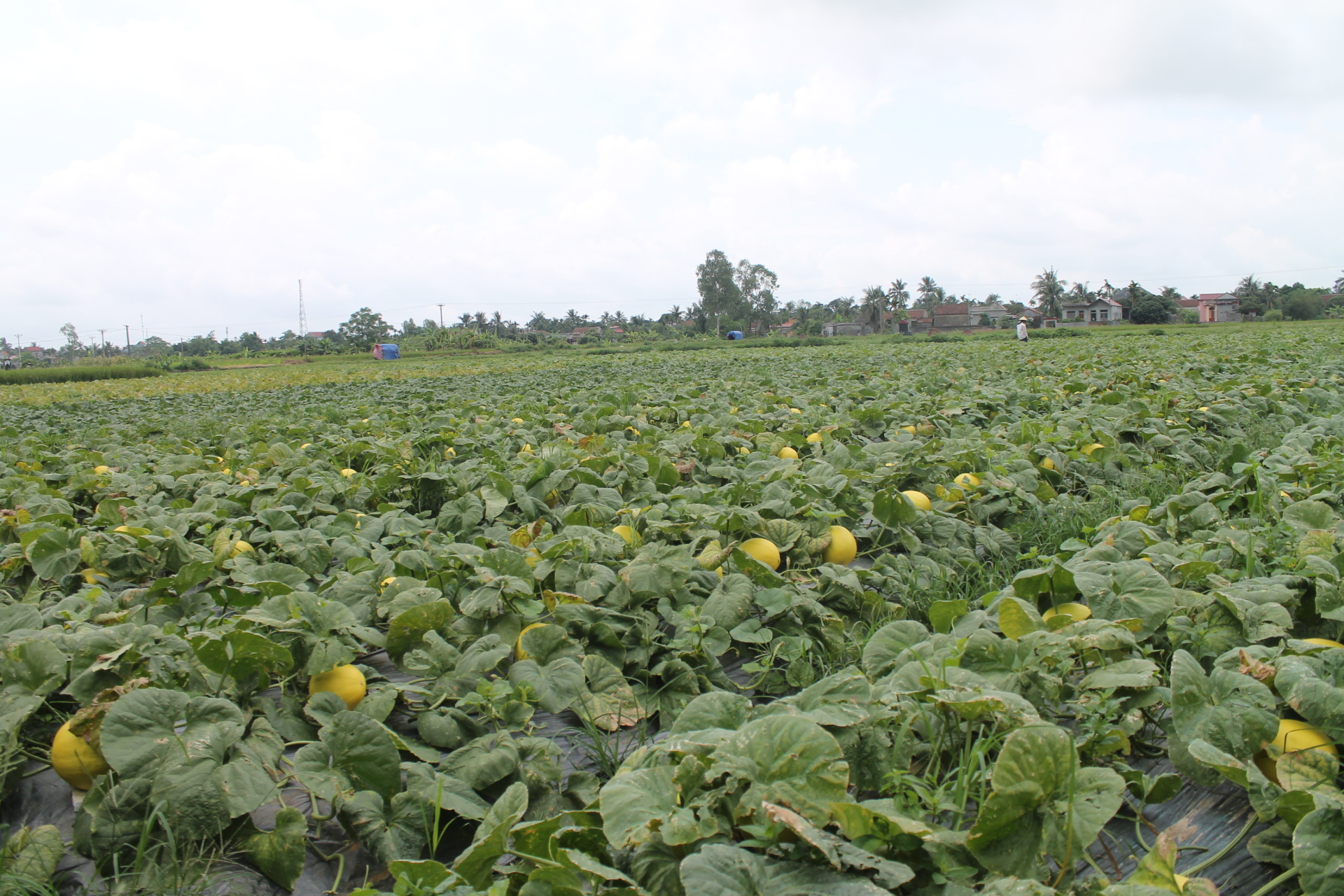
A melon field in Tân Hưng.

Since 2016, Tân Hưng commune has emerged as the locality with the most successful melon growth in Vietnam. The type of yellow melon is known as Golden Lady (kim cô nương), Golden Empress (kim hoàng hậu) or Golden Emperor (kim thiên hoàng) what can be harvested from two to three seasons per year. In particular, since VietGAP standard has been applied, the melon output has reached 1800 or 2000 tons per season.

During the years after the passing of the COVID-19 epidemic, Vĩnh Bảo Agricultural Extension Agency (Note: Trạm khuyến nông Vĩnh Bảo.) has begun to deploy intellectual investment and technical means for rươi processing.

== See also ==
- Ninh Giang district
- Quỳnh Phụ district
- Thái Thụy district
- Tiên Lãng district
- Tứ Kỳ district
