= Bính Bridge =

Bính Bridge Cầu Bính
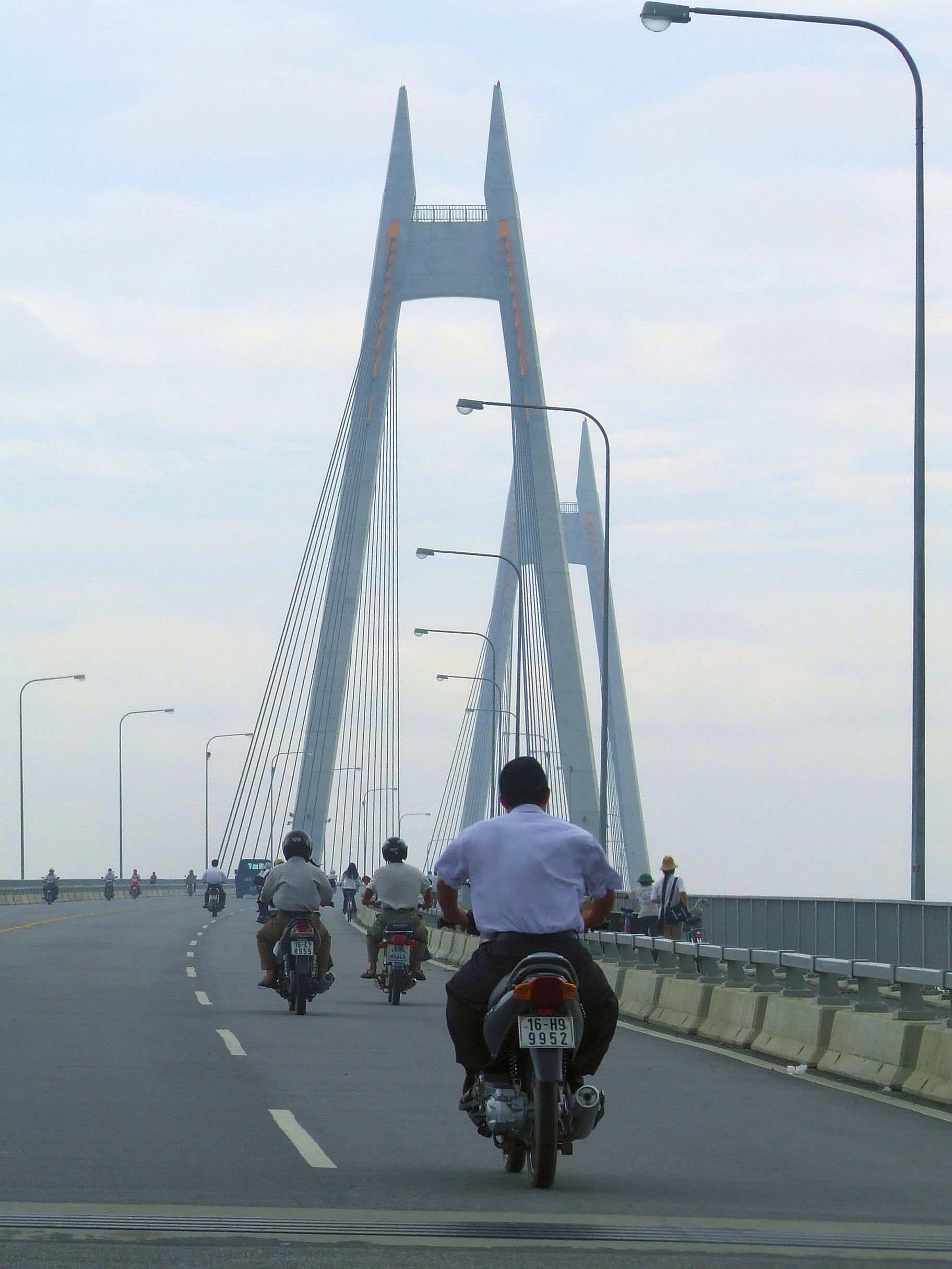
- The bridge view from road level
- Coordinates: 20°52′31″N 106°40′04″E
- Carries: 6 lanes (2 lanes each way and 2 pedestrian lanes)
- Crosses: Sông Cấm (Cấm River)
- Locale: Hai Phong, Vietnam

Characteristics
- Design: Cable-stayed bridge
- Total length: 1,280 meters (4,200 ft)
- Width: 22.5 meters (74 ft)
- Height: 102 meters (335 ft)
- Longest span: 260 meters (850 ft)
- Load limit: 3000 D WT
- Clearance below: 25 meters (82 ft)

History
- Constructed by: IHI Corporation; Sumitomo Mitsui Construction; Shimizu Corporation
- Construction start: September 1, 2002
- Opened: May 13, 2005

Location
- Interactive map of Bính Bridge

Bính Bridge (Vietnamese: Cầu Bính) is a cable-stayed bridge across the Cấm River. It was completed in 2005, and connects the Hai Phong city to the Thủy Nguyên District and out to Quảng Ninh.

== History ==
Harp-stayed structure

Bính Bridge is a modern cable-stayed bridge, measuring 1280 metres long and 22.5 metres wide. It has four lanes for traffic and two pedestrian lanes. The clearance below of 25 meters (82 ft) allows large ships to pass through. The bridge has concrete steel beam instances, continuous 17 span, the 102-metre-tall (335 ft) towers are made of reinforced concrete.

The bridge was constructed by a joint venture, consisting of Ishikawajima Harima Heavy Industries, Sumitomo Mitsui Construction and Shimizu Corporation, in 32 months. The owner of the bridge is the Project Management Office for Customs, under the leadership of the People's Committee of Hai Phong City.

Bính Bridge was built from Bính ferry 1300 m, to end the frequent traffic congestion and inconvenience to travel here by ferry. In addition, this bridge will help the development and formation of a new urban area of Hai Phong in the north area is prohibited. Along with the Kien bridge construction project on Highway 10, Bính Bridge played an important part in connection with the Quảng Ninh, Hai Phong, creating favorable conditions for the development of the transport network and the North economy of coastal areas in northern Vietnam.

Bính Bridge construction started on September 1, 2002 and ended May 13, 2005. Japanese government helped fund the bridge with a loan, around VND 943 billion or 7426 million Yen at that time. The projects are eligible for preferential loans of the Bank of Japan International Cooperation (JBIC).

== Incident ==
On the night of July 17, 2010, three large ships were moored at the wharf. Then the storm broke the cords, lead the vessels drift on the Cam River and then they had impact substantially on the Bính Bridge. Three vessels crashed into Bính Bridge include Shinsung Accord ship (Korean ship owner), tonnage 17,500 tons (the Corporation Bach Dang Shipbuilding Industry launched in mid-June), the two remaining ships was 1700 TEU Vinashin Express Transport Company 01 container ship from South China Sea Transport Company and the Vinashin Orient Corporation ship of Hai Duong Shipbuilding Industry which was being repaired here.

With scratched cables, the experts expect that if the cable is deformed, it takes about 6 months to replace the new cable.
