= Hai Phong Port =

Port group in Hai Phong City, Vietnam

Port of Hai Phong Joint Stock Company
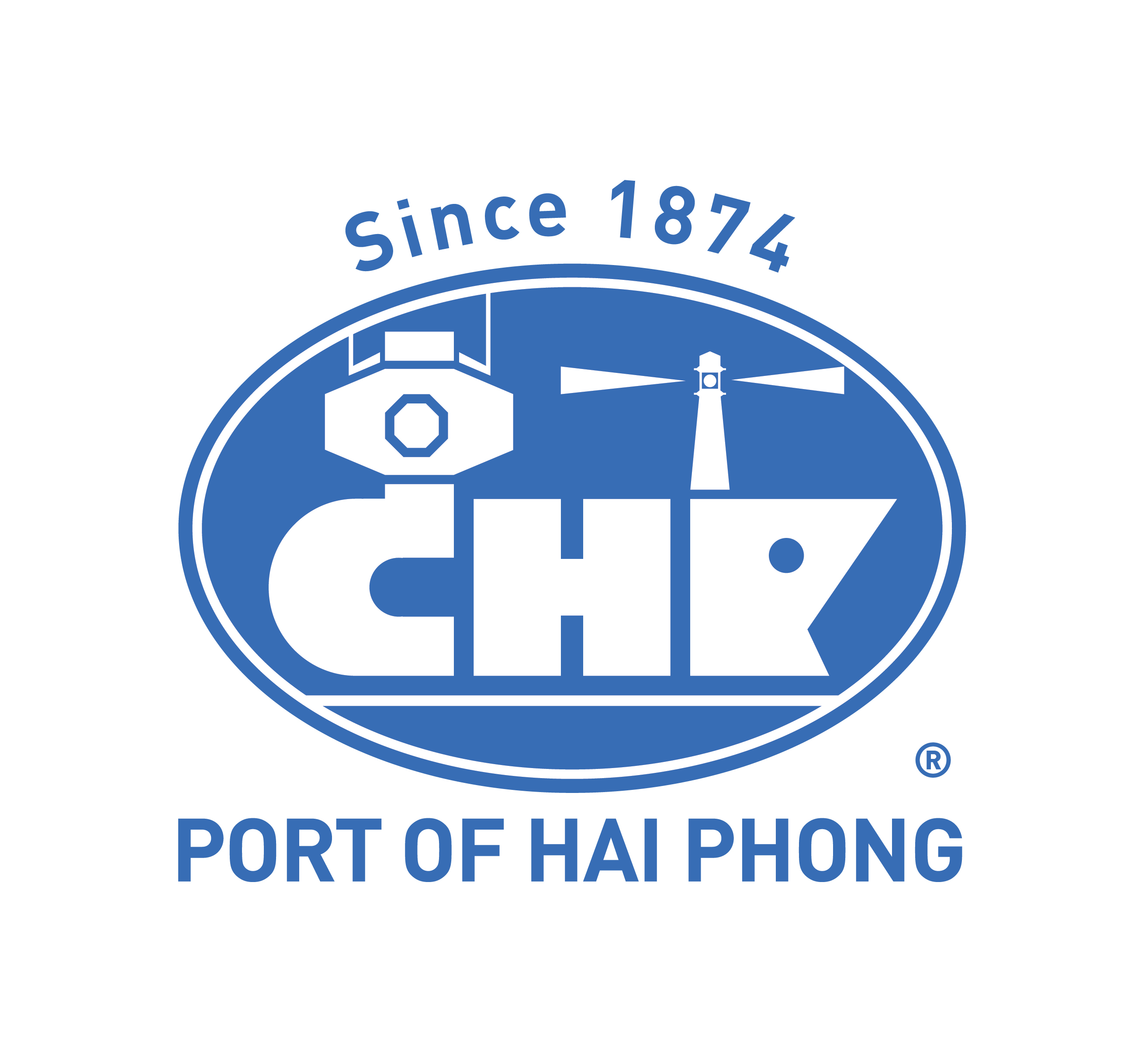
- Official logo

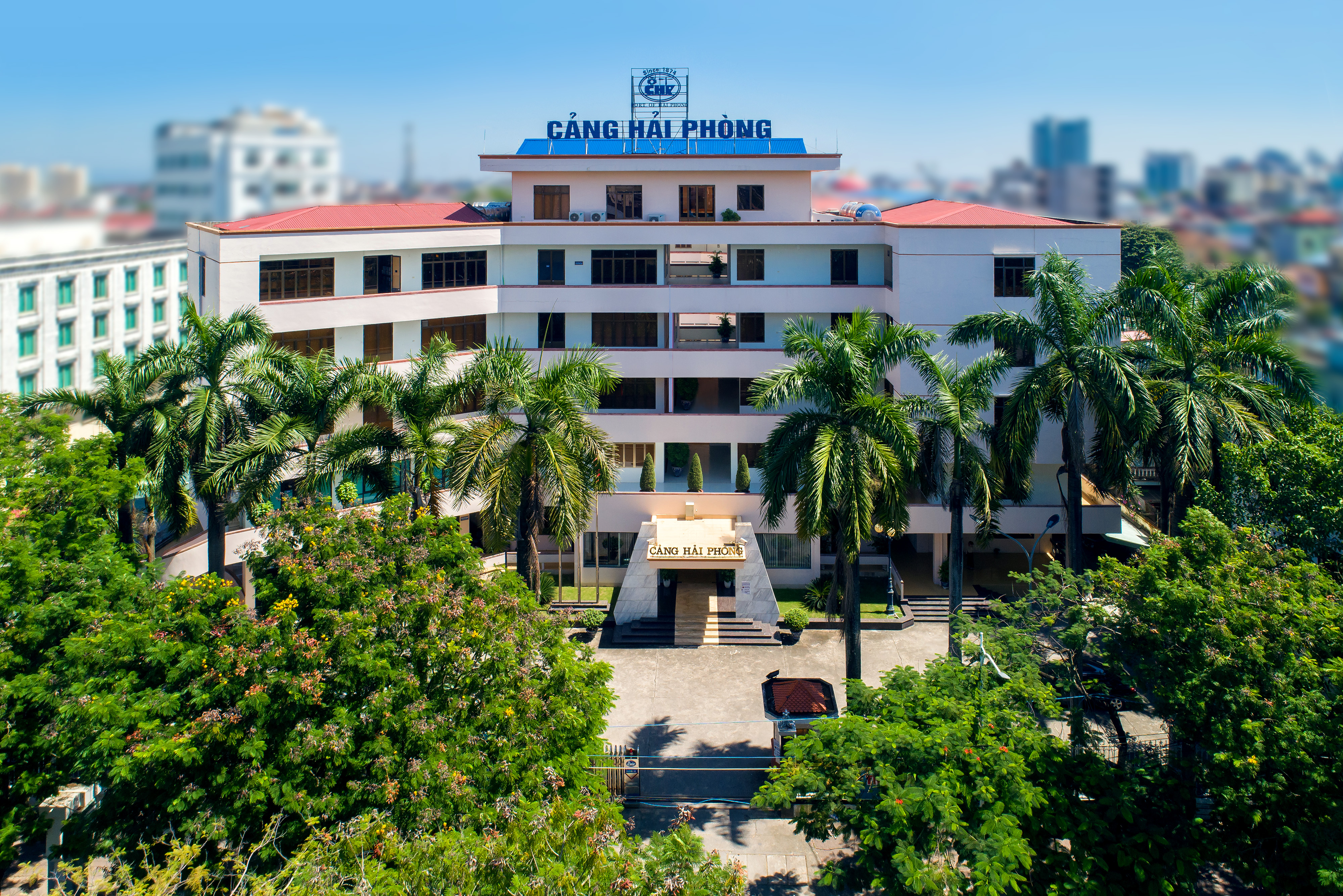
- Headquarters building of Haiphong Port
- Type: Public
- Traded as: UPCOM: PHP
- Industry: Port operations, logistics
- Founded: 1874
- Headquarters: 8A Trần Phú Street, Ngô Quyền, Haiphong, Vietnam
- Revenue: VND 2.91 trillion (2024)
- Operating income: VND 183 billion (Q1 2025)
- Website: Official website

Port of Hai Phong or Hai Phong Port (Vietnamese: Cảng Hải Phòng) is a port group in Haiphong City, Vietnam. The UN/LOCODE of Port of Hai Phong is VNHPH. This is one of the two largest and oldest general seaports in Vietnam, together with Saigon Port in the south. In 2022 and 2024, Hai Phong Port was ranked 28th and 32nd among the world’s top 100 container ports, with a throughput of 5,695,839 TEUs, according to Lloyd’s List.

Between 2018 and 2024, the development of Hai Phong area includes the construction of Lạch Huyện Island, connected to the mainland by a bridge, located approximately 40 km east of Hai Phong City. In 2024, Haiphong Port TIL International Terminal Ltd., a joint venture between Hai Phong Port and the Mediterranean Shipping Company (MSC), commenced operations at berths No. 3 and No. 4 of the Lach Huyen port area in 2025. From May 2025, the Government of Vietnam allowed Lach Huyen to accommodate vessels of up to 165,000 DWT.

In early 2025, the Kunming–Lao Cai–Hanoi–Haiphong Corridor project was announced by both China and Vietnam, aiming to turn Hai Phong into a free trade zone (FTZ Hai Phong) and a transhipment hub of the region, with new railway projects connecting China and Vietnam’s capital Hanoi, terminating at Lach Huyen.
