= Thủy Nguyên =

- Ward
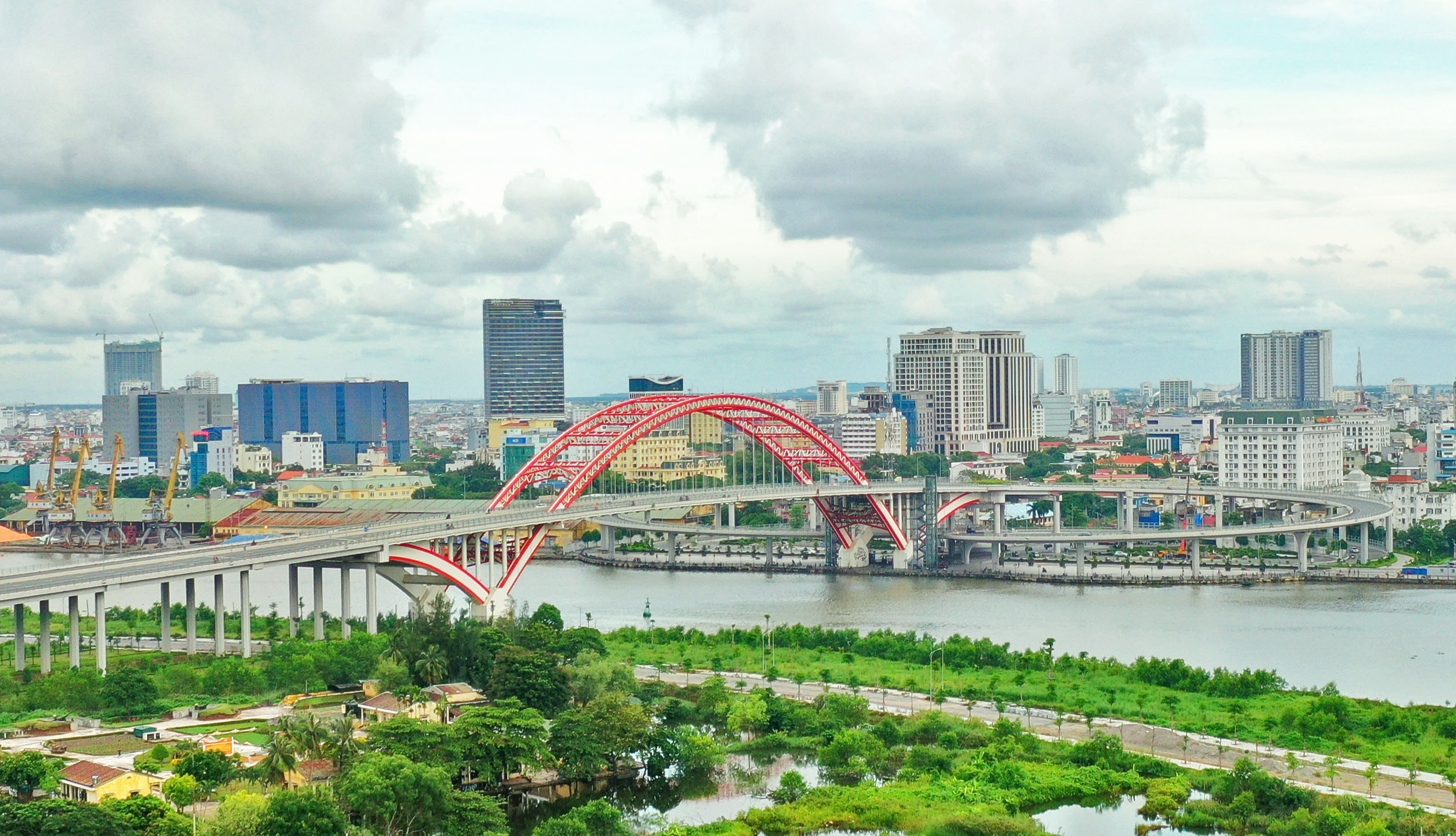
- View of the city center from Thủy Nguyên Ward
- Interactive map of Thủy Nguyên
- Coordinates: 20.91728014015509°N 106.67607934138047°E
- Country: Vietnam
- Region: Red River Delta
- Municipality: Hai Phong
- Established: 16 June 2025
- Administrative headquarters: No. 5 Đà Nẵng Street

Area
  - Total: 45.34 km^{2} (17.51 sq mi)

Population (2025)
  - Total: 71,731
  - Density: 1,582/km^{2} (4,100/sq mi)
- Website: thuynguyen.haiphong.gov.vn

Thủy Nguyên is a ward serving as the administrative center of Hai Phong, Vietnam. The ward inherited its name from the former Thủy Nguyên City.

The area of present-day Thủy Nguyên Ward was formerly located in Thủy Nguyên City, Hai Phong.

On 16 June 2025, the Standing Committee of the National Assembly of Vietnam issued a resolution on the arrangement of commune-level administrative units in Hai Phong in 2025. Under the resolution, the entire area and population of Dương Quan and Thủy Đường wards, together with parts of Hoa Động, An Lư, and Thủy Hà wards, were merged to form a new ward named Thủy Nguyên.
