= Việt Tiến =

- Commune
- Hưng Yên University of Technical Education
- Interactive map of Việt Tiến
- Coordinates: 20.831618118377143°N 106.01283342330946°E
- Country: Vietnam
- Region: Red River Delta
- Province: Hưng Yên province
- Established: 16 June 2025

Area
  - Total: 20.18 km^{2} (7.79 sq mi)

Population (2025)
  - Total: 35,161
  - Density: 1,742/km^{2} (4,510/sq mi)

Việt Tiến is a commune in Hưng Yên province, Vietnam.

== History ==
The area of present-day Việt Tiến Commune was formerly part of Khoái Châu district in Hưng Yên province.

On 16 June 2025, the National Assembly of Vietnam adopted Resolution No. 203/2025/QH15 amending and supplementing several articles of the Constitution of the Socialist Republic of Vietnam, effective on the same date. Under the resolution, district-level administrative units nationwide ceased to operate from 1 July 2025.

The Standing Committee of the National Assembly of Vietnam issued Resolution No. 1666/NQ-UBTVQH15 on the arrangement of commune-level administrative units in Hưng Yên province in 2025, effective from 16 June 2025. Under the resolution, the entire area and population of Đồng Tiến, Dân Tiến, and Việt Hòa communes, formerly part of Khoái Châu district, were merged to form a new commune named Việt Tiến.
