= Tiến Thắng =

- Commune
- Interactive map of Tiến Thắng
- Coordinates: 21.207858306819215°N 105.68795543465893°E
- Country: Vietnam
- Region: Red River Delta
- Municipality: Hanoi
- Administrative headquarters: Văn Lôi Hamlet

Area
  - Total: 36.34 km^{2} (14.03 sq mi)

Population (2025)
  - Total: 64,246
  - Density: 1,768/km^{2} (4,580/sq mi)
- Website: tienthang.hanoi.gov.vn

Tiến Thắng is a commune in the municipality of Hanoi, Vietnam.

On 16 June 2025, district-level administrative units nationwide ceased to operate.

On the same date, the Standing Committee of the National Assembly of Vietnam issued Resolution No. 1656/NQ-UBTVQH15 on the arrangement of commune-level administrative units in Hanoi in 2025. Under the resolution, the entire area and population of Tam Đồng, Tiến Thắng, and Tự Lập communes, parts of Đại Thịnh, Kim Hoa, and Thanh Lâm communes, and the remaining areas of Văn Khê and Thạch Đà communes, all formerly part of Mê Linh district, were merged to form a new commune named Tiến Thắng.
