= Tiên Lãng district =

Coordinates: 20.717°N 106.583°E

Tiên Lãng district Huyện Tiên Lãng Tiên Minh huyện
- Rural District
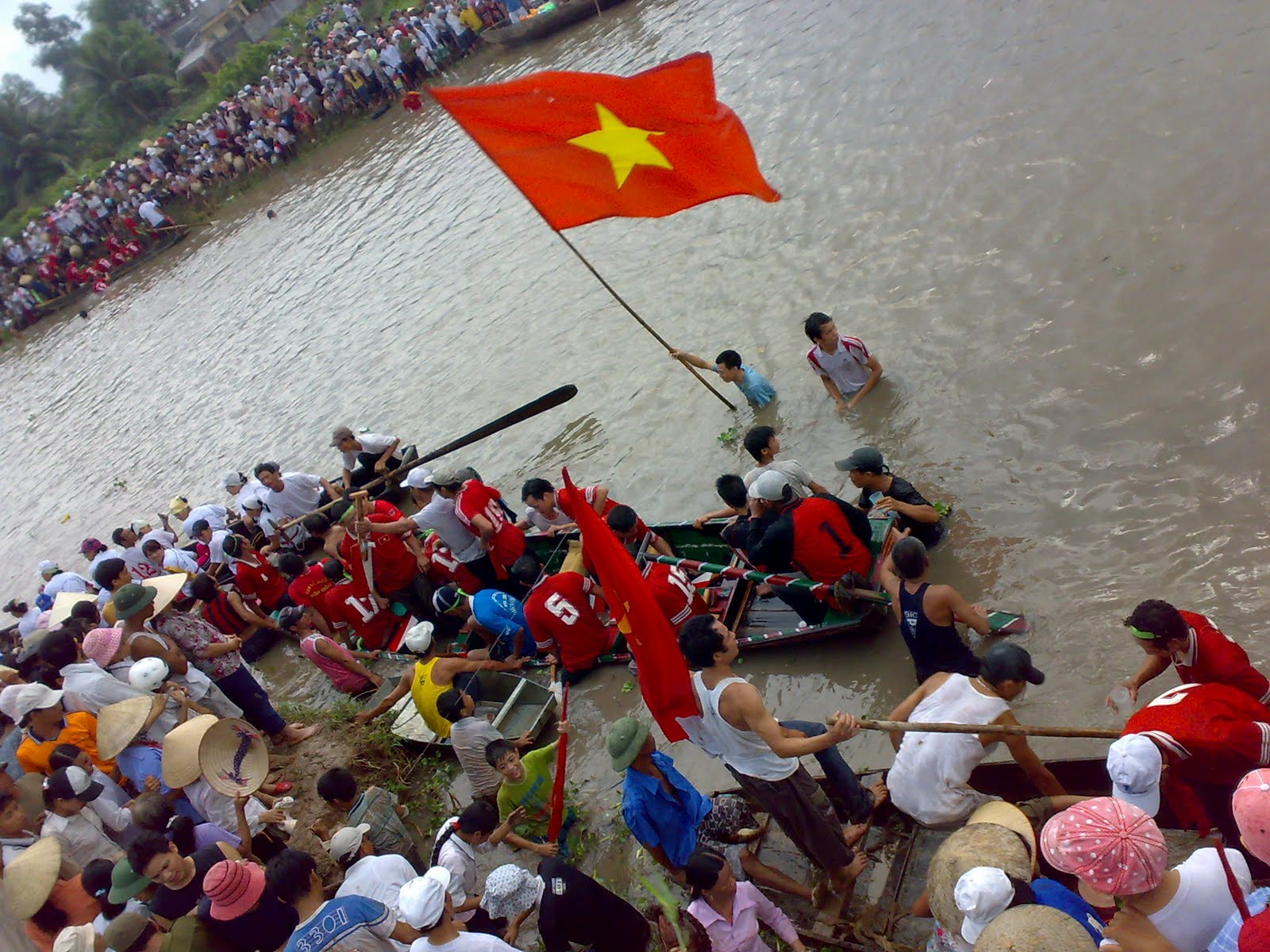
- Boating festival to pray for rain in Đoàn Lập commune, August 30, 2009.
- Interactive map of Tiên Lãng district
- Country: Vietnam
- Region: Red River Delta
- Municipality (Class-I): Hải Phòng
- Establishment: 18th century
- Central hall: Block 2, Cựu Đôi street, Tiên Lãng township

Government
  - Type: Rural district
  - People Committee's Chairman: Phạm Minh Đức
  - People Council's chairman: Nguyễn Thị Mai Phương
  - Front Committee's chairman: Nguyễn Thị Bích Huyền
  - Party Committee's Secretary: Nguyễn Thị Mai Phương

Area
  - Total: 195 km^{2} (75 sq mi)

Population (December 31, 2022)
  - Total: 185,619
  - Density: 951/km^{2} (2,460/sq mi)
  - Ethnicities: Kinh; Tanka
- Time zone: UTC+7 (Indochina Time)
- ZIP code: 4000–05000–05200 (Note: An official code from December 31, 2022, to present.)
- Website: Tienlang.Haiphong.gov.vn; Tienlang.Haiphong.dcs.vn

Tiên Lãng [tiən˧˧:laʔaŋ˧˥] is a former rural district of Hải Phòng in the Red River Delta of Vietnam.

== History ==
According to Đại Việt sử ký toàn thư, Tiên Lãng rural district (先朗縣, (Note: 漢字寫法見於法屬時期漢文資料。) huyện Tiên Lãng) used to be called Bình Hà, Tân Minh, Tiên Minh. However, since the end of the 19th century, under the Nguyễn Dynasty, it was changed to Tiên Lãng, belonging to Hải Dương province.

From February 17, 1906, until 1945, Tiên Lãng was transferred to Kiến An province. Under the State of Vietnam regime, it was called as Tiên Lãng district (先朗郡, quận Tiên Lãng).

On October 27, 1962, Kiến An province was merged into Hải Phòng city. Since then, Tiên Lãng has belonged to Hải Phòng.

== Geography ==
Currently, Tiên Lãng rural district is divided into 19 commune-level administrative units.

- 1 municipality : Tiên Lãng capital-township.
- 18 communes : Bắc Hưng, Cấp Tiến, Đại Thắng, Đoàn Lập, Đông Hưng, Hùng Thắng, Khởi Nghĩa, Kiến Thiết, Nam Hưng, Quyết Tiến, Tân Minh, Tây Hưng, Tiên Cường, Tiên Minh, Tiên Thắng, Tiên Thanh, Tự Cường, Vinh Quang.

== Culture ==
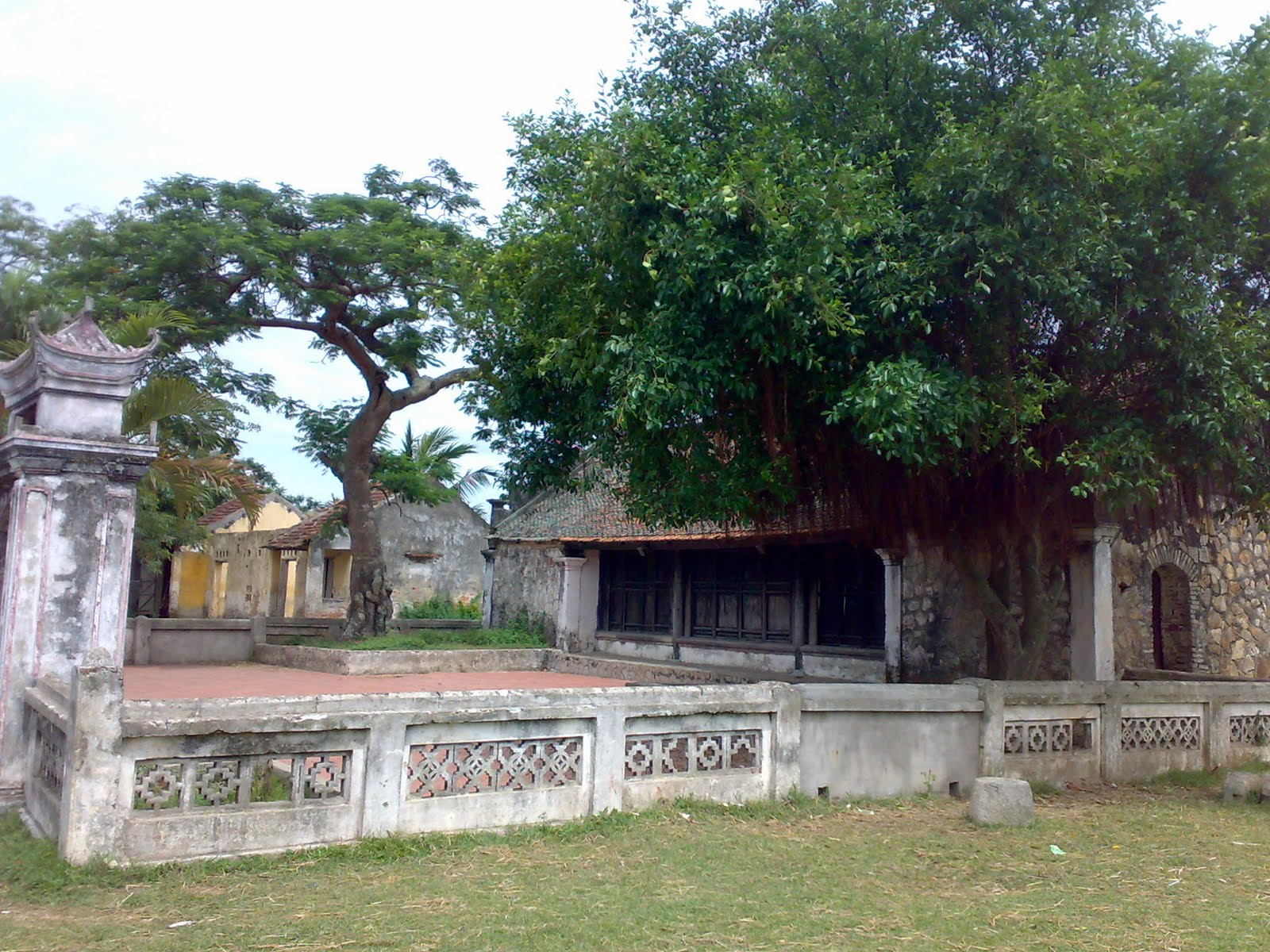
Tử Đôi communal hall

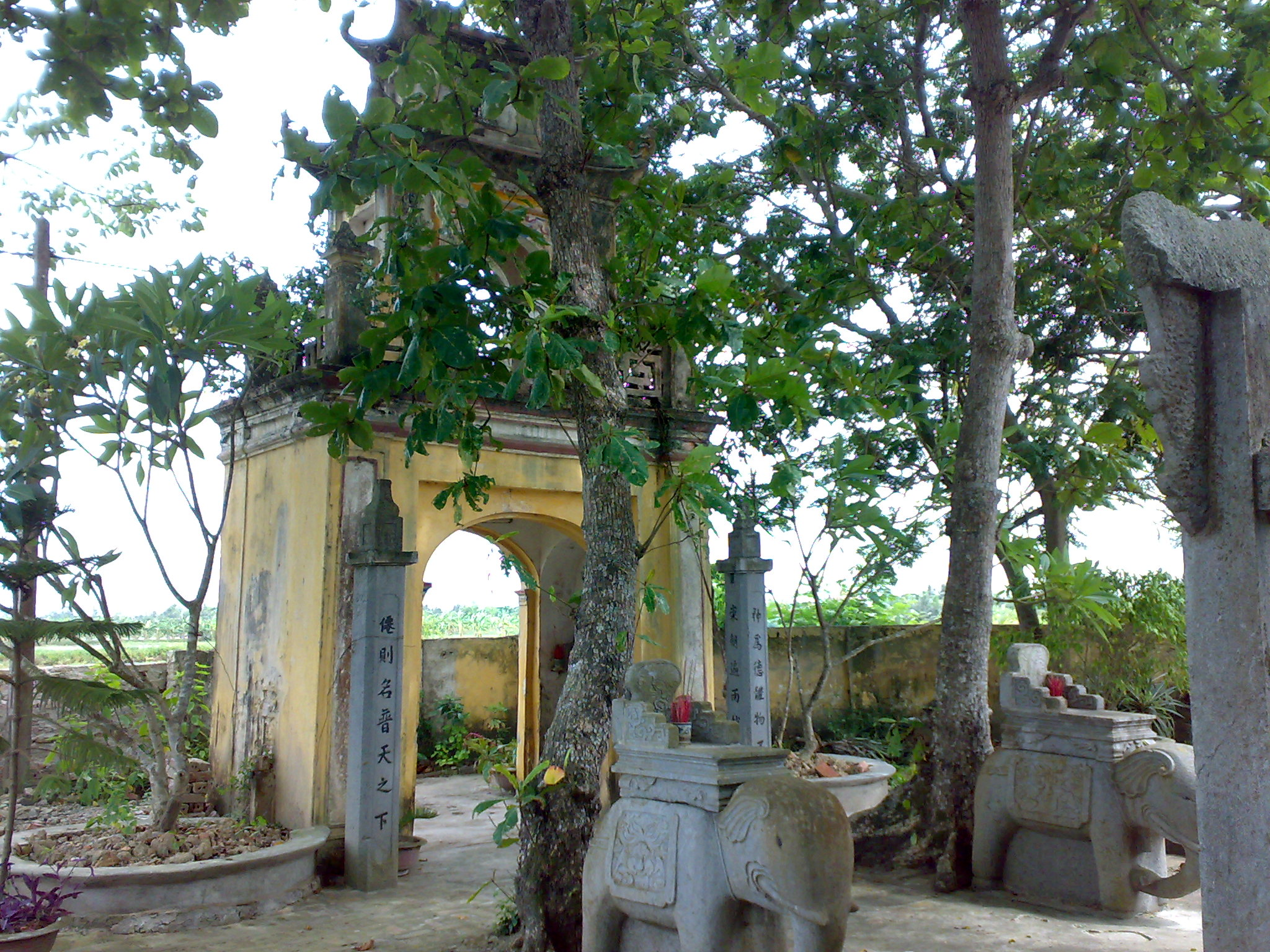
Kinh Sơn temple in Vân Đôi village

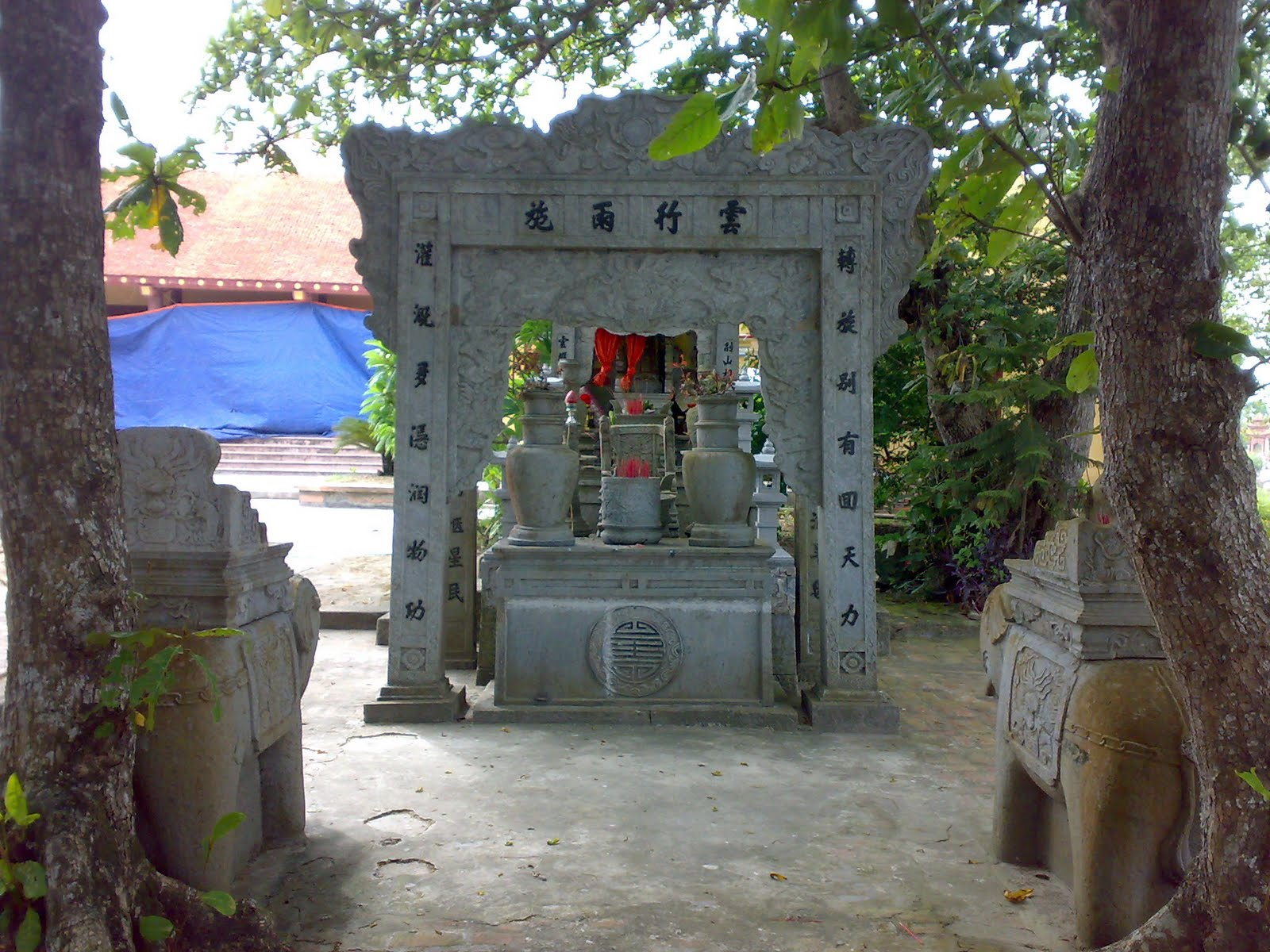
Kinh Sơn temple in Vân Đôi village

== See also ==
- An Lão district
- Cát Bà district
- Đồ Sơn district
- Thủy Nguyên district
