= Haiphong =

Centrally-governed city of Vietnam

- Centrally-governed city (Class-1)
- Hải Phòng City; Thành phố Hải Phòng
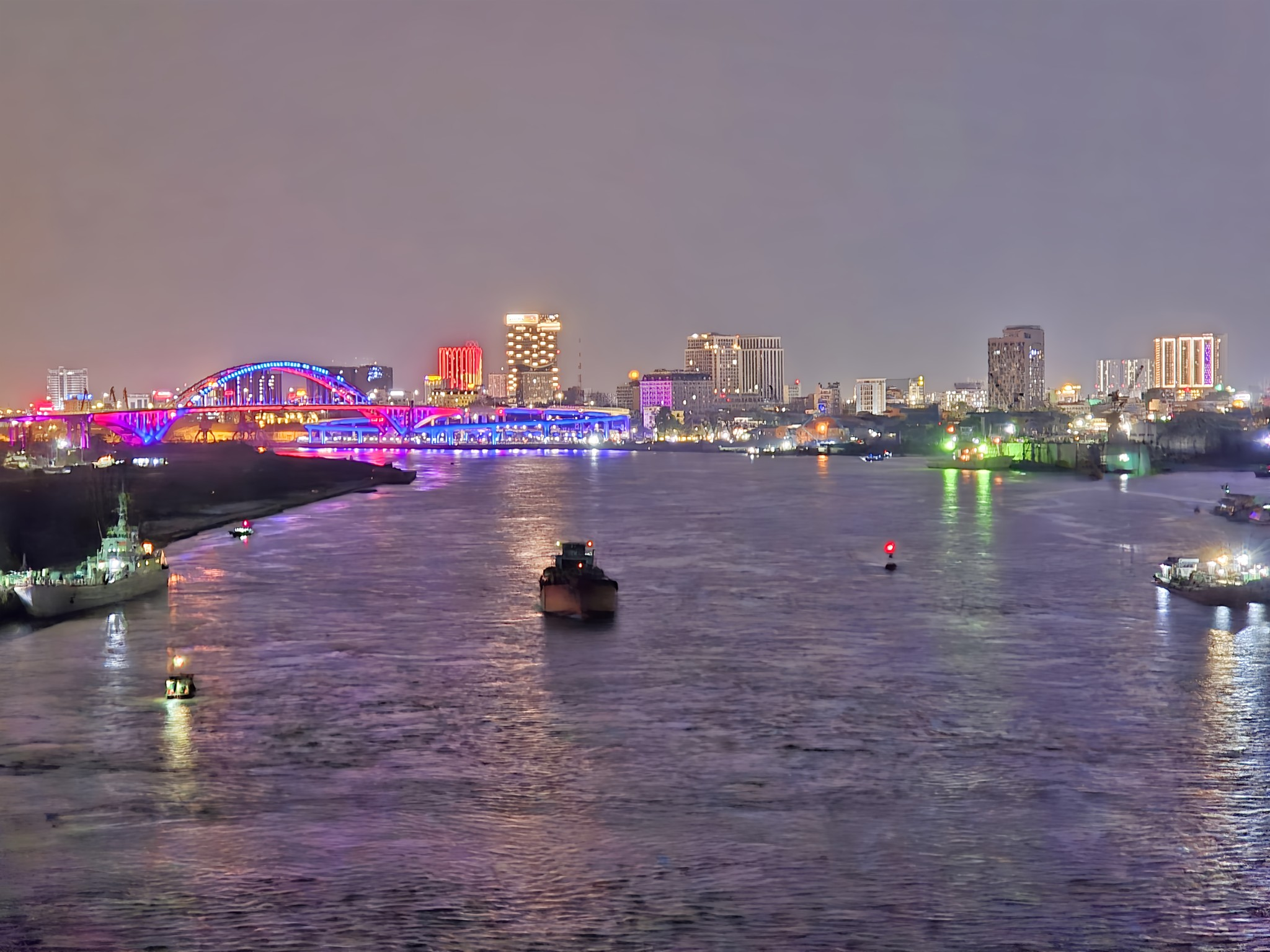
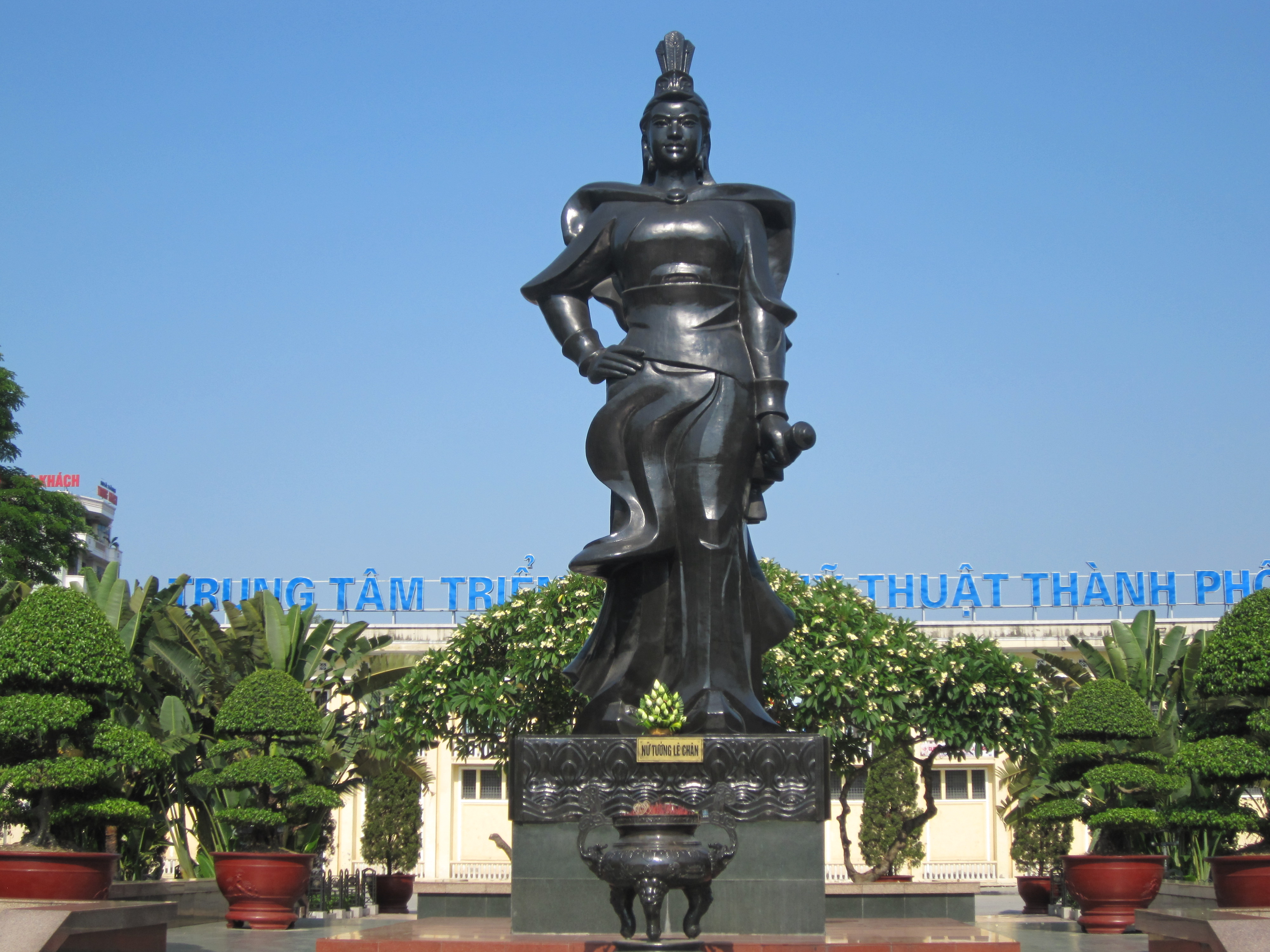
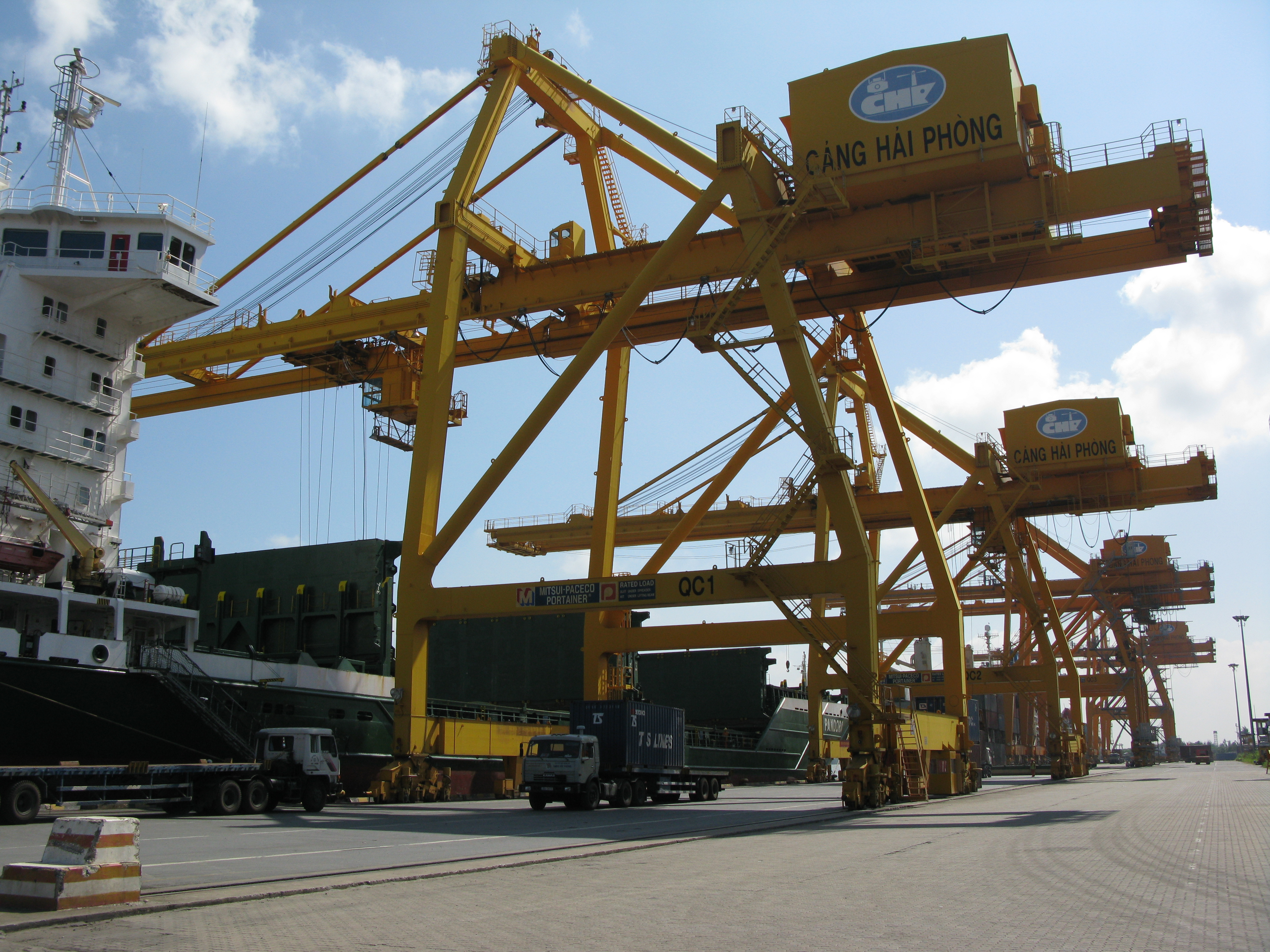
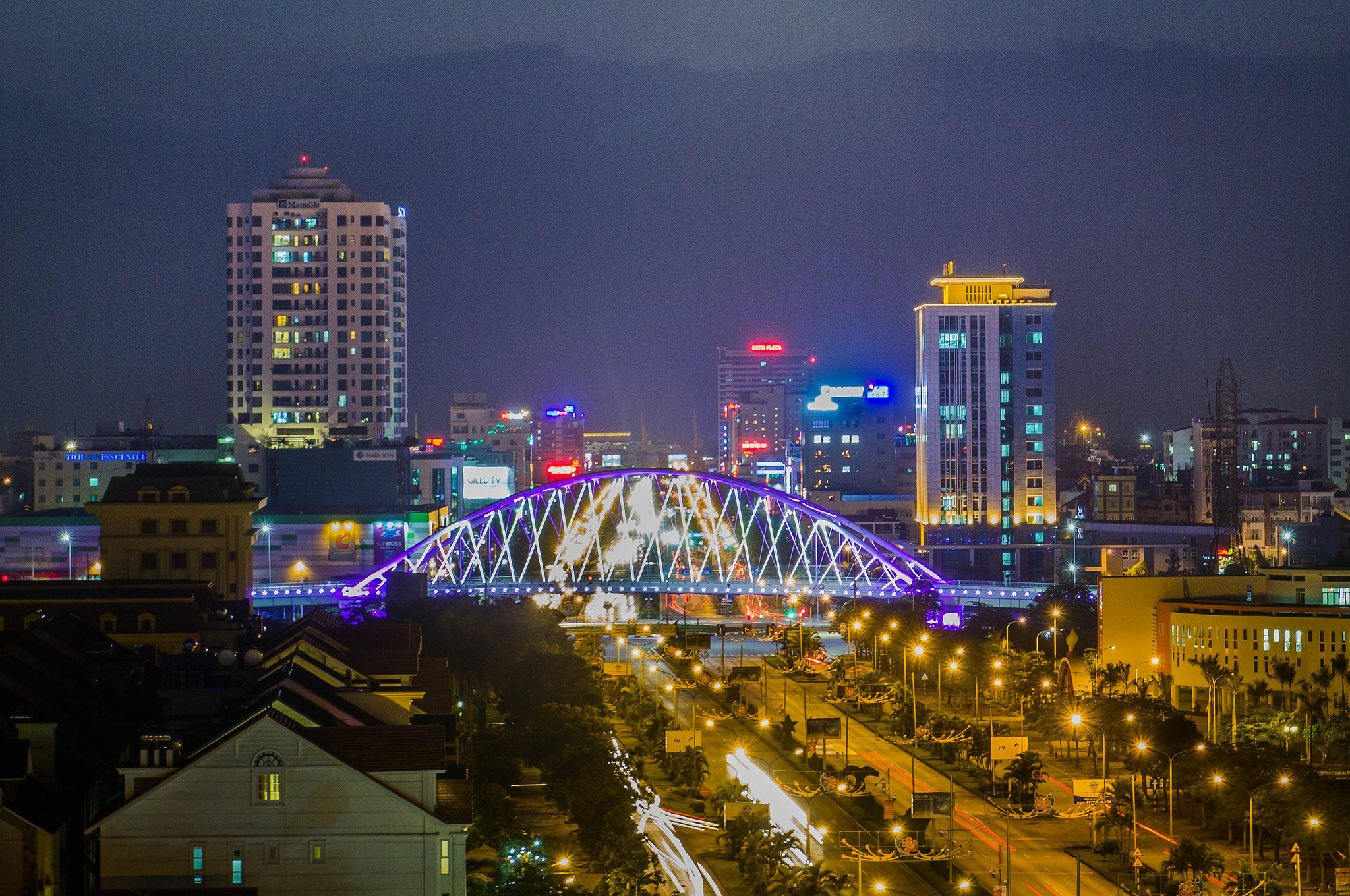
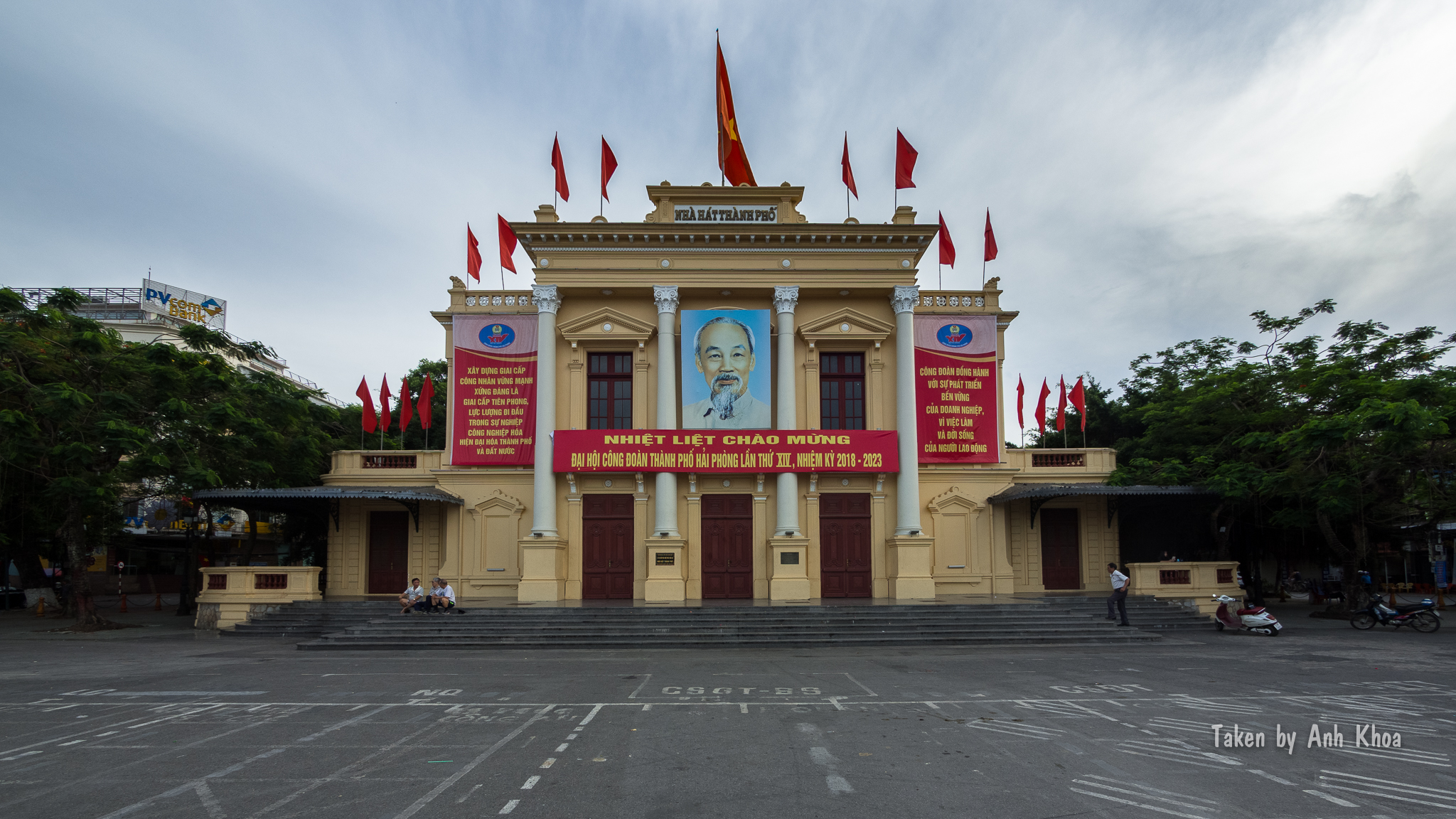
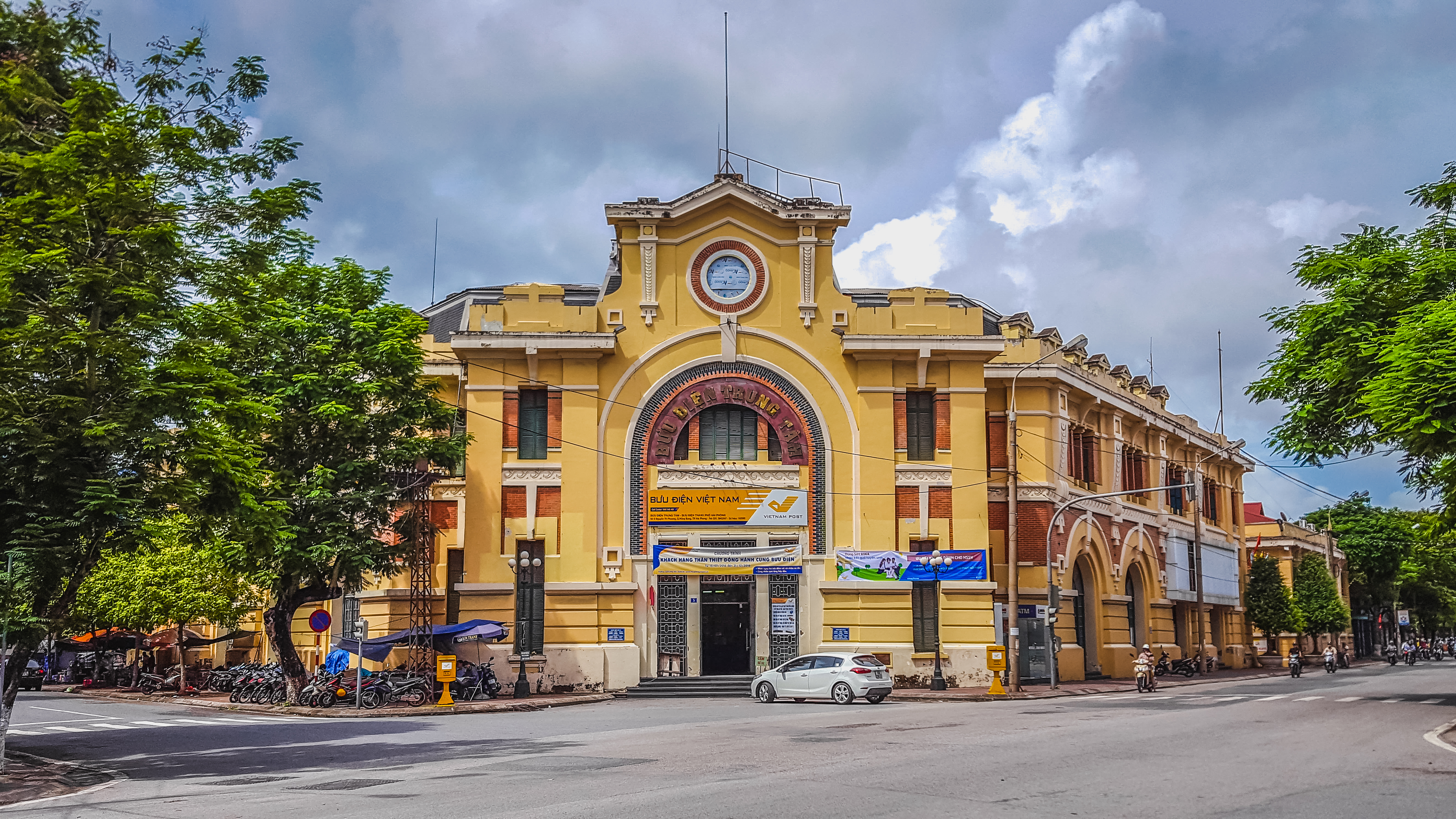
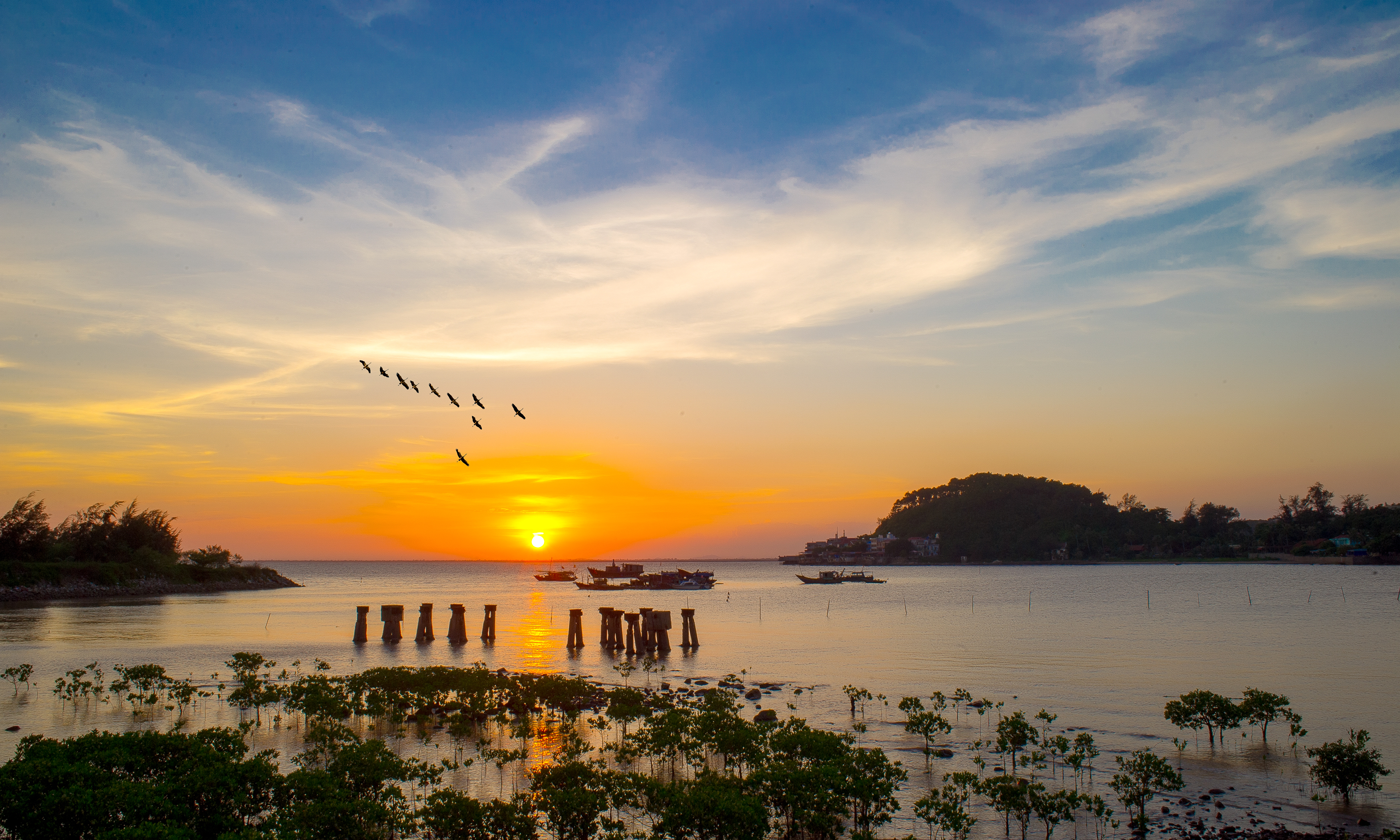
- Haiphong skyline on Cấm River Lê Chân’s statue in front of the City Art Center Chùa Vẽ Terminal of Haiphong Port Nguyễn Bỉnh Khiêm overpass Haiphong Opera House City Post Office Đồ Sơn Beach

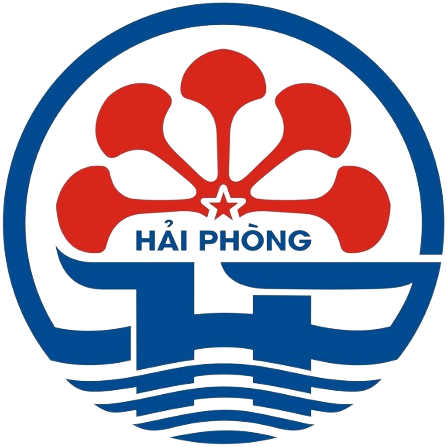
- Coat of arms
- Nickname: City of Phoenix flowers (Thành phố Hoa Phượng Đỏ)
- Provincial location in Vietnam
- Interactive map of Haiphong
- Coordinates: 20°51′54.5″N 106°41′01.8″E
- Country: Vietnam
- Region: Red River Delta
- Seat: Thủy Nguyên
- Subdivision: 45 wards, 67 communes, 2 special zones

Government
  - Type: Municipality
  - Body: Haiphong People's Council
  - Secretary of the City Party Committee: Lê Ngọc Châu
  - Chairman of City People's Council: Lê Văn Hiệu
  - Chairman of City People's Committee: Đỗ Thành Trung
  - Chairman of Fatherland Front: Phạm Văn Lập

Area
  - Centrally-governed city (Class-1): 3,194.72 km^{2} (1,233.49 sq mi)

Population (2025)
  - Centrally-governed city (Class-1): 4,664,124
  - Density: 1,459/km^{2} (3,780/sq mi)
  - Urban: 2,346,921

Ethnic groups
  - Vietnamese: 99.6%
  - Others: 0.4%

GDP (PPP, constant 2015 values)
  - Year: 2023
  - Total (Metro): $28.9 billion
  - Per capita: $20,300
- Time zone: UTC+07:00 (ICT)
- Postal code: 04xxx–05xxx
- Area codes: 225
- ISO 3166 code: VN-HP
- License plate: 15, 16, 34
- HDI (2022): ▲0.812 (4th)
- Climate: Cwa
- International airport: Cat Bi International Airport
- Website: en.haiphong.gov.vn

Haiphong or Hai Phong (Vietnamese: Hải Phòng, pronounced [haːj˧˩ fawŋ͡m˨˩]) is the third-largest city in Vietnam, with an area of 3,194.72 km^{2} (1,233.49 mi^{2}). It includes Bạch Long Vĩ and Cát Bà islands in the Gulf of Tonkin. Haiphong has a population of 4,664,124 in 2025. Haiphong holds the historical distinction of being the first city in both Vietnam and Mainland Southeast Asia to be electrified.

== Geography ==
Haiphong is a coastal city located at the mouth of the Cấm River, in Vietnam's north-eastern coastal area. The Bính Bridge crosses the Cam and connects the city with Thủy Nguyên municipal city. It has a total natural area of 3,194.72 square kilometres or 319,472 hectares. It borders Quảng Ninh City to the north, Bắc Ninh Province to the northwest, Hưng Yên Province to the southwest, and the Gulf of Tonkin to the east. Bach Long Vi island, Cat Ba Island and the Long Châu islands, located in the Gulf, are also administered as part of the city. Tidal flat ecosystems occur adjacent to the city, some have been reclaimed for agriculture or development purposes.

=== Climate ===
Haiphong features a humid subtropical climate (Koppen: Cwa) with hot, humid summers and warm, dry winters. The city is wetter from April through October; roughly 90% of the city's annual rainfall (which totals approximately 1,700 millimetres or 67 inches) typically falls during these months. There is a difference in temperatures between the city's winters and summers. Haiphong's coolest months, January and February, sees average high temperatures reach 20 °C (68 °F) and average low temperatures at around 14 °C (57.2 °F). Its warmest months, June and July, sees average high temperatures hover around 33 °C (91.4 °F) and average low temperatures at around 26 °C (78.8 °F). Sea temperatures range from a low of 21 °C (70 °F) in February to a high of 30 °C (86 °F) during the months of July and August.

Climate data for Haiphong (Phù Liễn, Kiến An district)
Month	Jan	Feb	Mar	Apr	May	Jun	Jul	Aug	Sep	Oct	Nov	Dec	Year
Record high °C (°F)	31.0 (87.8)	34.1 (93.4)	35.4 (95.7)	37.4 (99.3)	41.5 (106.7)	39.5 (103.1)	38.5 (101.3)	39.4 (102.9)	37.4 (99.3)	36.6 (97.9)	33.1 (91.6)	30.0 (86.0)	41.5 (106.7)
Mean daily maximum °C (°F)	19.8 (67.6)	20.1 (68.2)	22.2 (72.0)	26.4 (79.5)	30.6 (87.1)	32.0 (89.6)	32.1 (89.8)	31.5 (88.7)	30.8 (87.4)	29.0 (84.2)	25.8 (78.4)	22.1 (71.8)	26.9 (80.4)
Daily mean °C (°F)	16.3 (61.3)	17.0 (62.6)	19.4 (66.9)	23.1 (73.6)	26.6 (79.9)	28.2 (82.8)	28.4 (83.1)	27.8 (82.0)	26.9 (80.4)	24.7 (76.5)	21.5 (70.7)	18.1 (64.6)	23.2 (73.8)
Mean daily minimum °C (°F)	14.2 (57.6)	15.2 (59.4)	17.7 (63.9)	21.1 (70.0)	24.1 (75.4)	25.6 (78.1)	25.9 (78.6)	25.3 (77.5)	24.3 (75.7)	22.0 (71.6)	18.8 (65.8)	15.5 (59.9)	20.8 (69.4)
Record low °C (°F)	4.5 (40.1)	4.5 (40.1)	6.1 (43.0)	10.4 (50.7)	15.5 (59.9)	18.4 (65.1)	20.3 (68.5)	20.4 (68.7)	15.6 (60.1)	12.7 (54.9)	9.0 (48.2)	4.9 (40.8)	4.5 (40.1)
Average rainfall mm (inches)	28.0 (1.10)	27.4 (1.08)	48.5 (1.91)	85.3 (3.36)	201.6 (7.94)	238.1 (9.37)	238.1 (9.37)	353.0 (13.90)	257.1 (10.12)	136.3 (5.37)	43.0 (1.69)	22.8 (0.90)	1,679.3 (66.11)
Average rainy days	8.4	12.8	17.1	12.9	12.6	14.1	14.2	17.5	13.8	9.7	6.4	5.5	145.2
Average relative humidity (%)	84.4	88.5	90.9	90.7	87.5	86.8	86.6	88.4	86.3	82.3	79.8	79.5	86.0
Mean monthly sunshine hours	82.0	46.6	41.3	85.0	183.7	181.3	199.1	169.5	179.1	179.8	148.5	126.8	1,624.8
Source 1: Vietnam Institute for Building Science and Technology
Source 2: The Yearbook of Indochina (1930–1931)

Average sea temperature
Month	Jan	Feb	Mar	Apr	May	Jun	Jul	Aug	Sep	Oct	Nov	Dec	Year
Average temperature °C (°F)	22 °C (72 °F)	21 °C (70 °F)	22 °C (72 °F)	24 °C (75 °F)	27 °C (81 °F)	29 °C (84 °F)	30 °C (86 °F)	30 °C (86 °F)	29 °C (84 °F)	28 °C (82 °F)	26 °C (79 °F)	23 °C (73 °F)	26 °C (79 °F)

== History ==
=== Dynasties ===
Haiphong was the home of Lê Chân, one of the female generals under the command of the Trưng Sisters who rose against Chinese domination in 40 AD and ruled until their defeat in 43 AD. Lê Chân was known to have established the Hải tần Phòng thủ ("Defense of the Coast") during the war against general Ma Yuan of the Han dynasty.

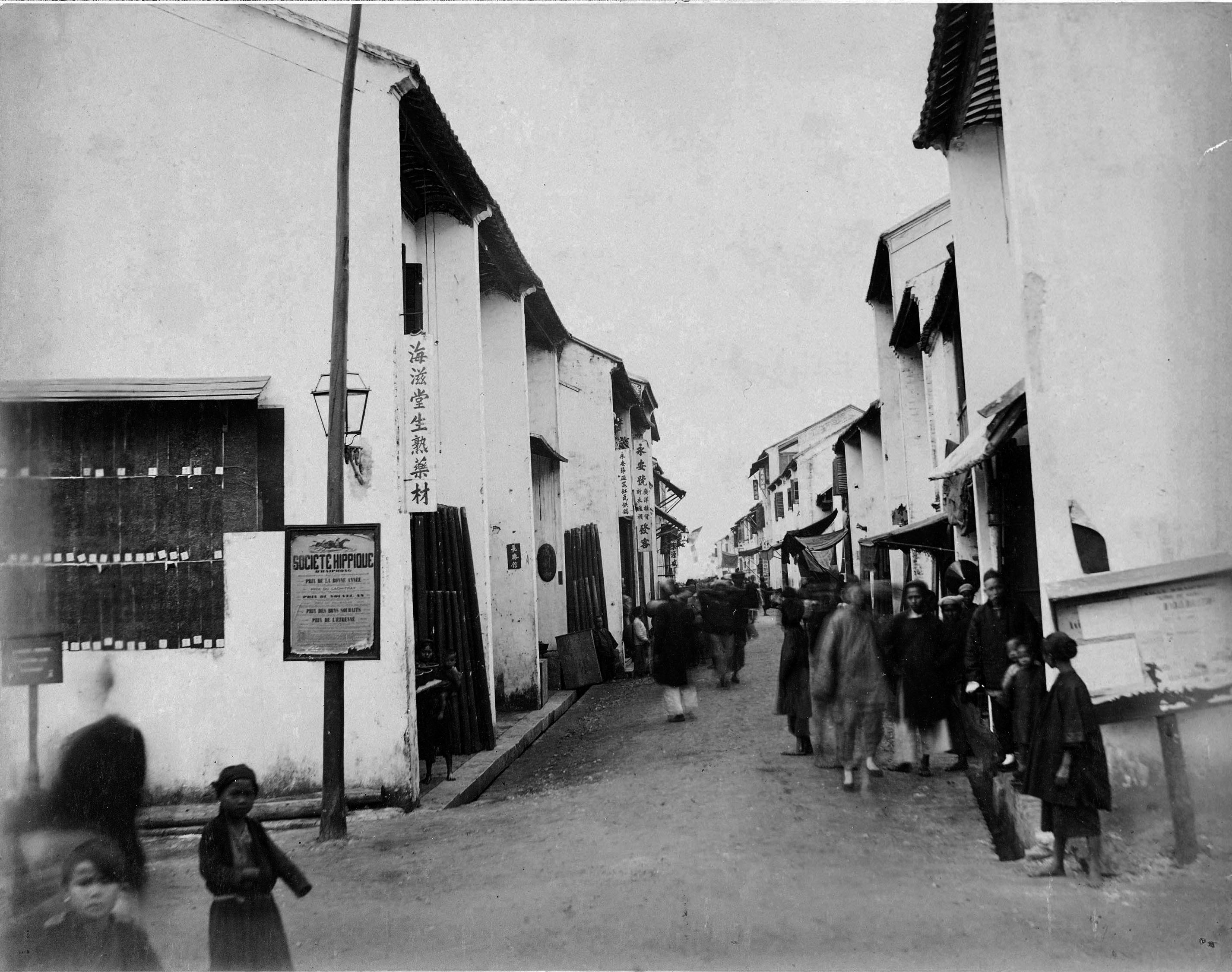
A street in the 19th century

By the 19th century, at the end of Tự Đức's reign, the Hang Kenh Communal House in what is later the city's Le Chan District was made the administrative seat of An Dương District.

=== Democratic Republic of Vietnam ===
Following the defeat of Japan in World War II, Vietnamese nationalists agitated for independence against French return. French forces landed in Haiphong and encountered resistance which resulted in the deaths of three French soldiers. In retaliation, the French ships, among them the cruiser Suffren, shelled the city, setting it ablaze and precipitating the First Indochina War. French infantry forces under the command of Jean-Étienne Valluy entered the city, fighting house to house with the support of armored units and airplanes.

In the Vietnam War, Haiphong was subjected to bombing by US Navy and Air Force strike aircraft. U.S. Admiral Thomas H. Moorer ordered the mining of Haiphong harbor on 8 May 1972, effectively sealing the port. Until it was lifted, the mining caused no casualties. The physical structure of the city was mostly unaffected by the war as the US had a self-imposed prohibition zone for the city. After the war, the city recovered its role as an industrial center.

=== Socialist Republic of Vietnam ===
On 20 February 2025 the Vietnamese parliament approved an $8 billion railroad investment to upgrade under Xi Jinping's Belt and road initiative the old French-built Kunming–Haiphong railway, which serves the Chinese border city Hekou Yao, Lao Cai, Hanoi and Haiphong.

On 12 June 2025, the National Assembly issued Resolution No. 202/2025/QH15 on the arrangement of provincial-level administrative units (the resolution took effect on June 12, 2025). Accordingly, Hải Dương Province was merged into Hai Phong City.

== Economy ==
Haiphong is an economic center of the North in particular and Vietnam in general both. Under French domination, Haiphong was level 1 city, equal to Saigon and Hanoi. The last years of the 19th century, the French had proposed to build Haiphong into the economic capital of Indochina.

In 2009, Haiphong state budget revenue reached 34,000 billion Vnd. In 2011, budget revenues in the city reached 47,725 billion, increase 19% compared to 2010. In 2015, total revenues of the city reached 56 288 billion. Government plans that to 2020, Haiphong's revenues will be over 80,000 billion and the domestic revenue reach 20.000 billion. In the ranking of the Provincial Competitiveness Index (PCI) 2013 of Vietnam, Haiphong city ranked at No. 15/63 provinces. Haiphong has relationship of trading goods with more than 40 countries and territories around the world. It is striving to become one of the largest commercial centers of the country. On Vietnam's Provincial Competitiveness Index 2023, a tool for evaluating the business environment in Vietnam's provinces, Hai Phong received a score of 70.34. This was an improvement from 2022 in which the province received a score of 70.76. In 2023, the province received its highest scores on the 'Labor Policy' and 'Time Costs' criterion and lowest on 'Policy Bias' and ‘Transparency’.

=== Industry ===
Industry is a key sector in Haiphong including food processing, light industries and heavy industries. Major products include fish sauce, beer, cigarettes, textiles, paper, plastic pipes, cement, iron, pharmaceuticals, electric fans, motorbikes, steel pipes and ships and out-sourcing software implementation. Most of these industries have been growing more significantly between 2000 and 2007, with the exceptions of the cigarette and pharmaceutical industries. Shipbuilding, steel pipes, plastic pipes and textiles are among the industries with the most rapid growth.

There are also growing industries supplying products used by existing industries in the city. PetroVietnam set up a joint-venture PVTex with textile manufacturer Vinatex to build Vietnam's first polyester fiber plant in Haiphong. The factory will use by-products from oil-refining and reduce reliance on imported materials. 270,600 people were employed in Haiphong's industry. 112,600 industrial jobs were created between 2000 and 2007.

=== Agriculture, forestry and fishery ===
Around one third of Haiphong's area or 52,300 ha (as of 2007) are used for agriculture. Rice takes up around 80% of the agricultural land with an output of 463,100 tons in 2007. Other agricultural products include maize, sugar and peanuts.

Haiphong has a fishing sector with an output of 79,705 tons (2007). Gross output has almost doubled between 2000 and 2007, mostly due to growth in aquaculture, which made up 60% of gross output in 2007. Sea fish contribute around one fourth to the sector.

As of 2007, 315,500 were employed in agriculture and fishery, a decrease from 396,300 in 2000. These sectors still account for almost a third of total employment in Haiphong, a larger share than industry.

== Demographics ==
Haiphong is the third most populous city in Vietnam, with a population of 2.103.500 for the metropolitan area (2015), encompassing an area of 1,507.57 km^{2} (582.08 sq mi), 46.1% of population reside in the urban districts. The gender distribution is half female (50.4%).

As of the 2009 census, Haiphong's average annual population growth rate was given as 4.0%. Haiphong's crude birth rate was recorded at 18.1 live births per 1000 persons vs the crude death rate of 7.6 per 1000 persons. Life expectancy at birth was estimated at 77.1 years for women and 72.0 years for men, or 74.5 years overall. Infant mortality rate was measured at 11.8 infant deaths per 1000 live births, over two points above the nation's average for urban areas. In the same census, the city's out-migration was 1.9% vs in-migration of 2.8% and, for a net migration rate of 0.9%.

== Transport ==
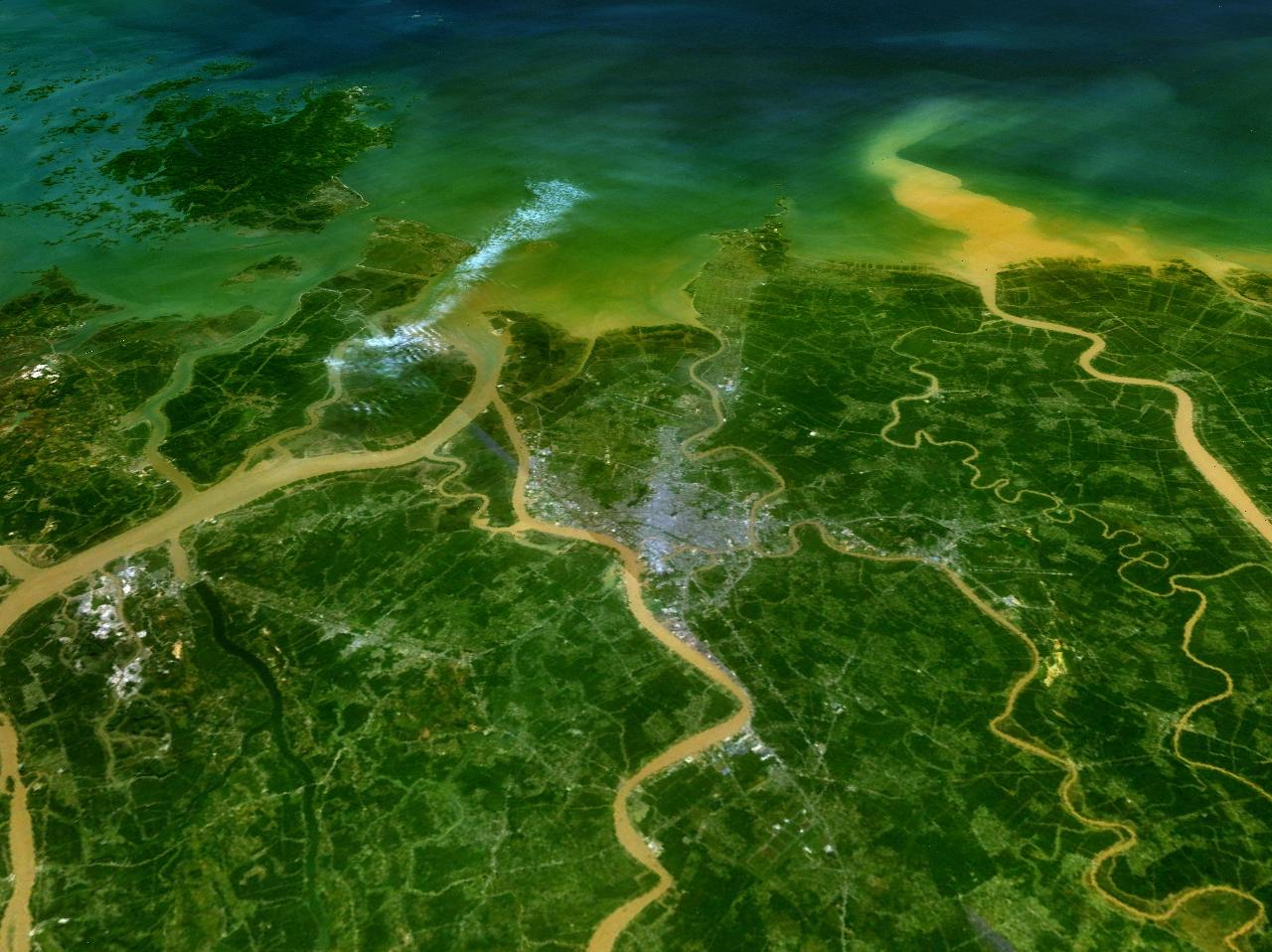
NASA image of Haiphong

Haiphong is located at the junction of two National Highways: Route 5, leading west to Hanoi, and Route 10, leading south to Nam Định and onward to connect with National Route 1 at Ninh Bình. Highway 356 passes west–east from the Route 5/10 junction through Haiphong's city center all the way to the coast. A connecting road from route 5 to route 18 links Haiphong with Quảng Ninh Province. In 2015, the new highway connecting Haiphong with Hanoi was completed; this reduces the trip by one hour as compared to the previous route.

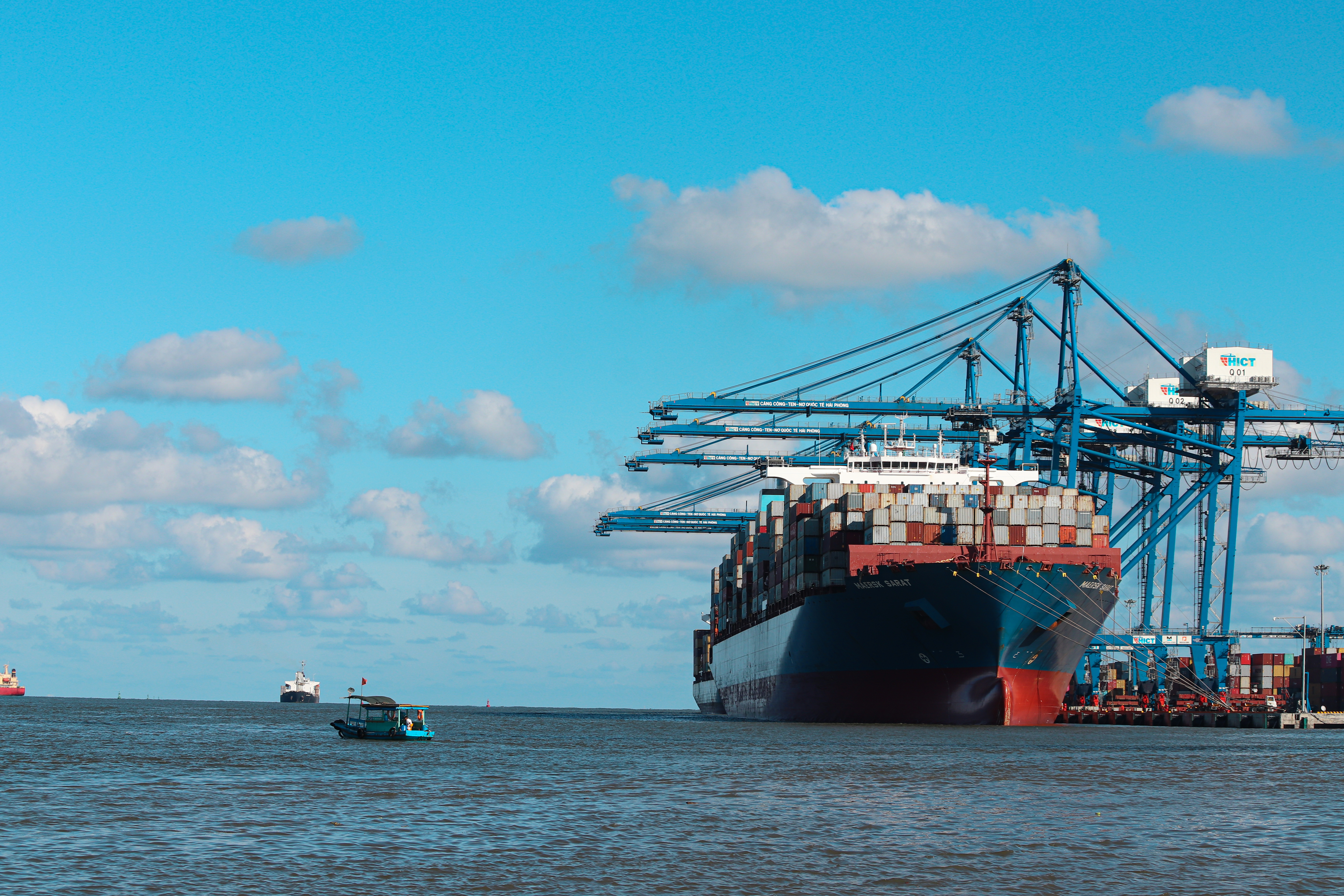
Moored container ship waiting to return to sea

The Port of Haiphong on the Cấm River is divided into three main docks: Hoang Dieu (Central terminal) located near the city's center, Chua Ve, and Dinh Vu both farther downstream to the east.

== Twin towns ==
- Da Nang, Vietnam
- Incheon, South Korea
- Kitakyushu, Japan
- Livorno, Italy
- Nanning, China
- Saint Petersburg, Russia
- Seattle, United States
- Tianjin, China

== Gallery ==
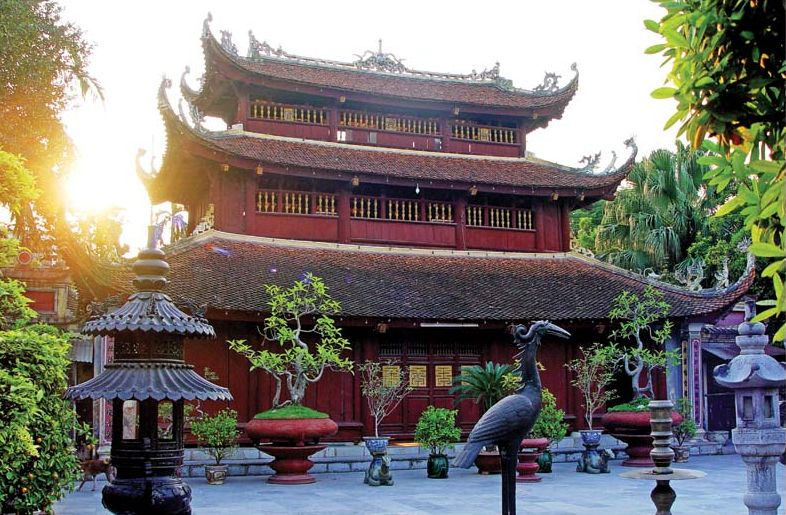
Du Hang Pagoda

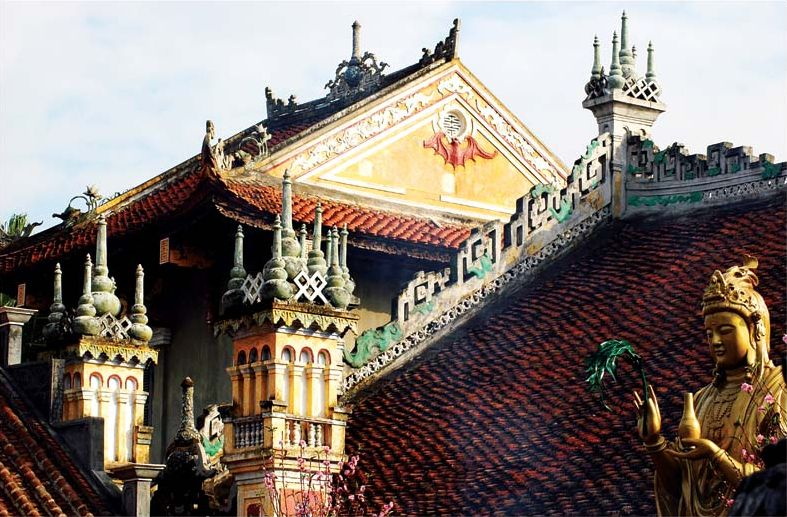
Du Hang Pagoda architecture

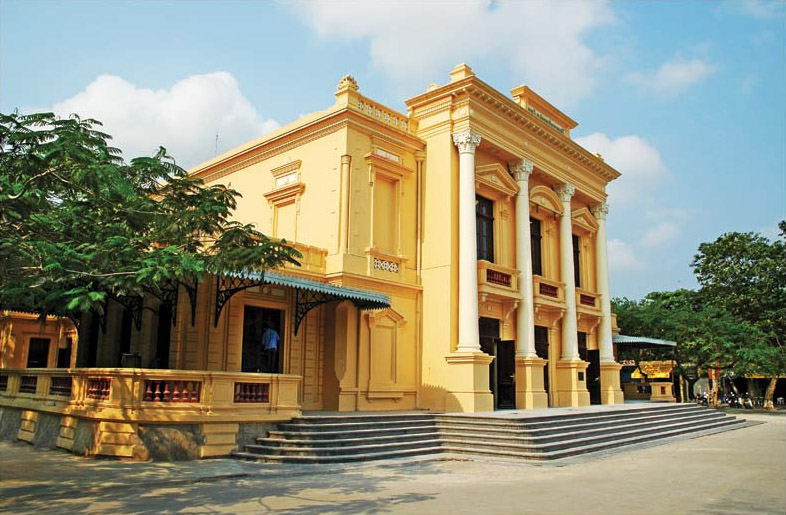
The city's Opera House

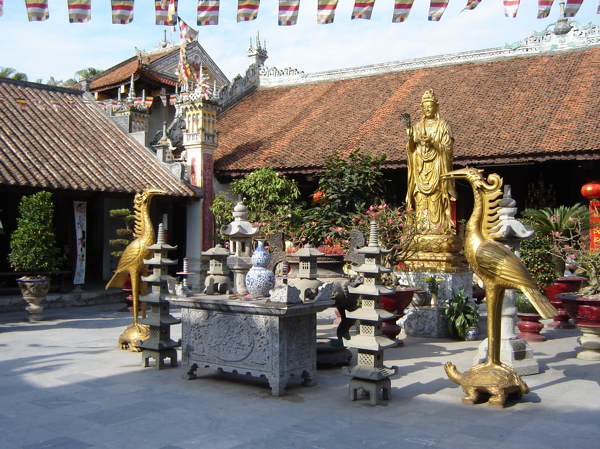
A Buddhist temple in Haiphong.

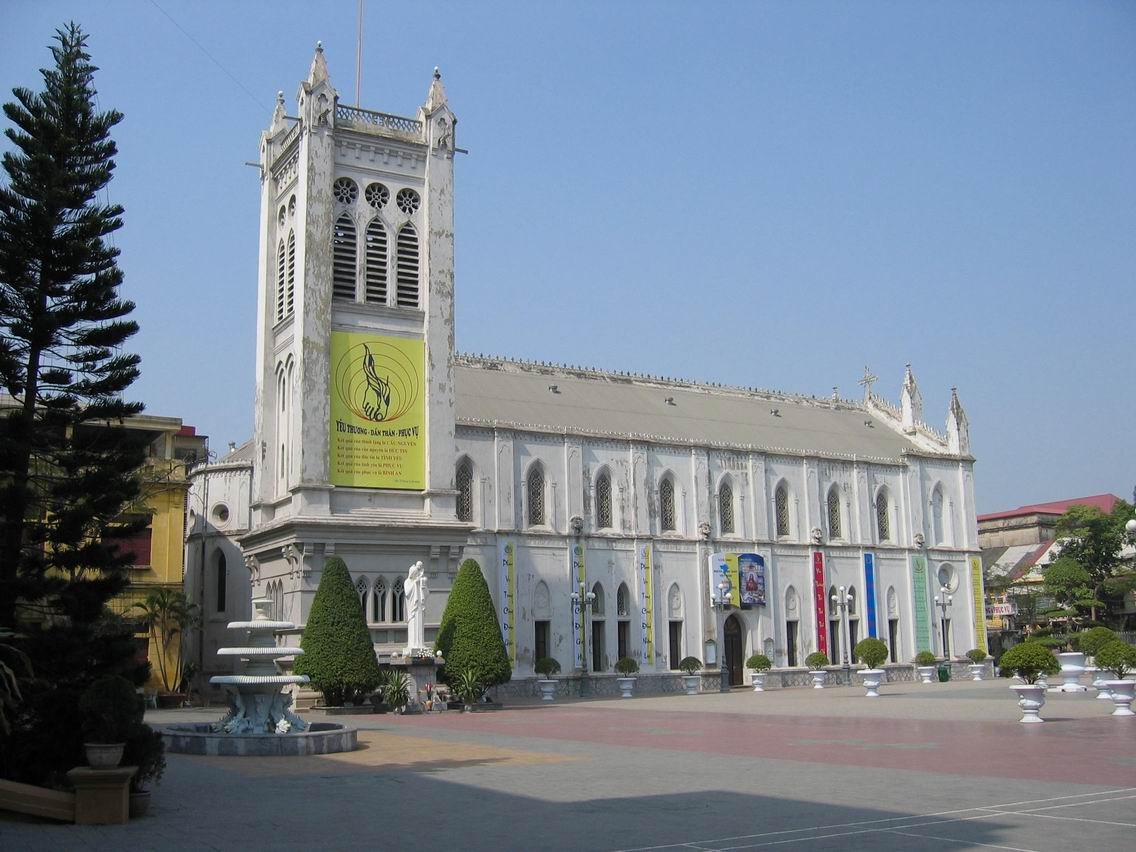
Haiphong Cathedral (2007)

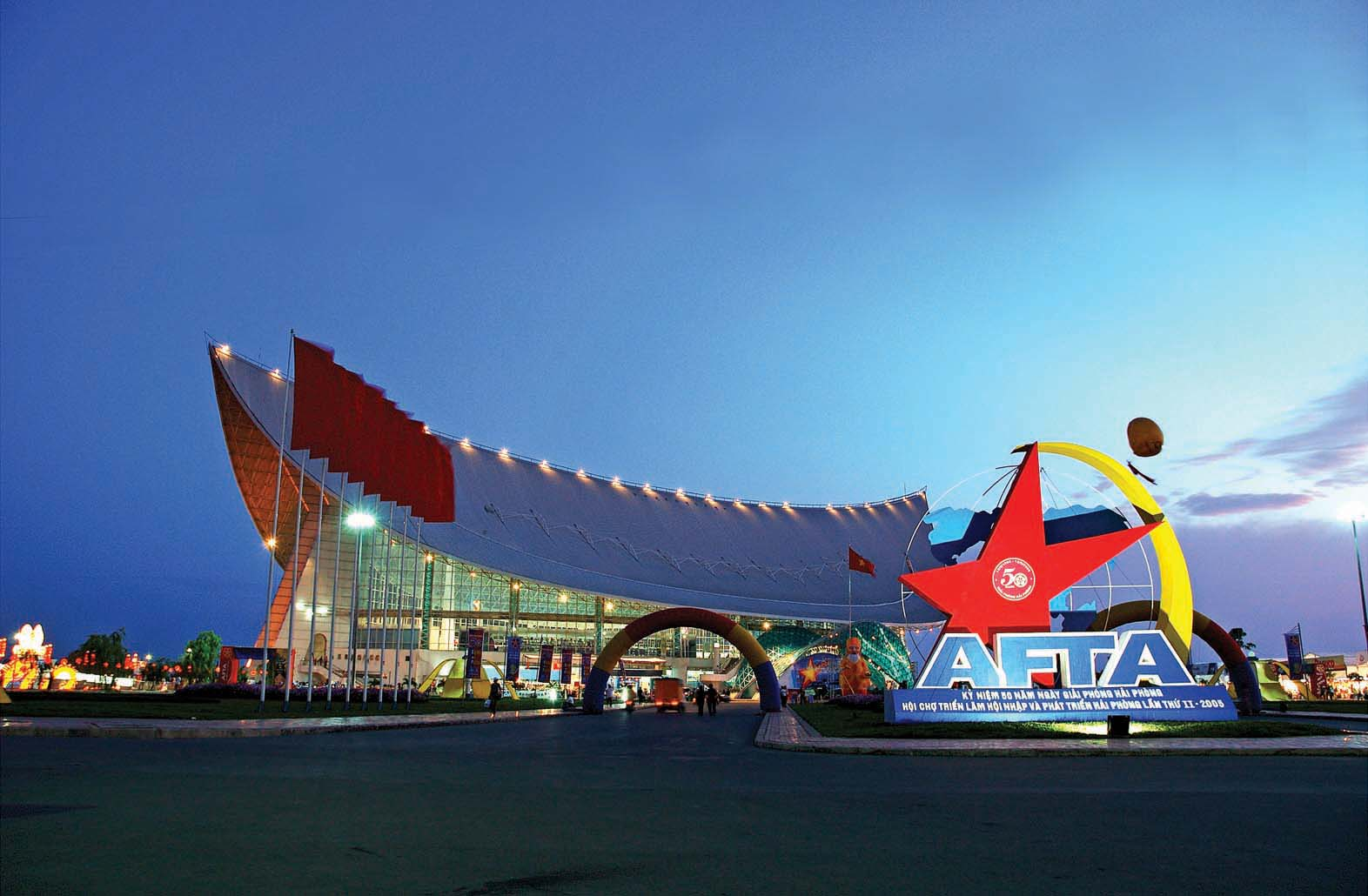
Haiphong City International Exhibition Center

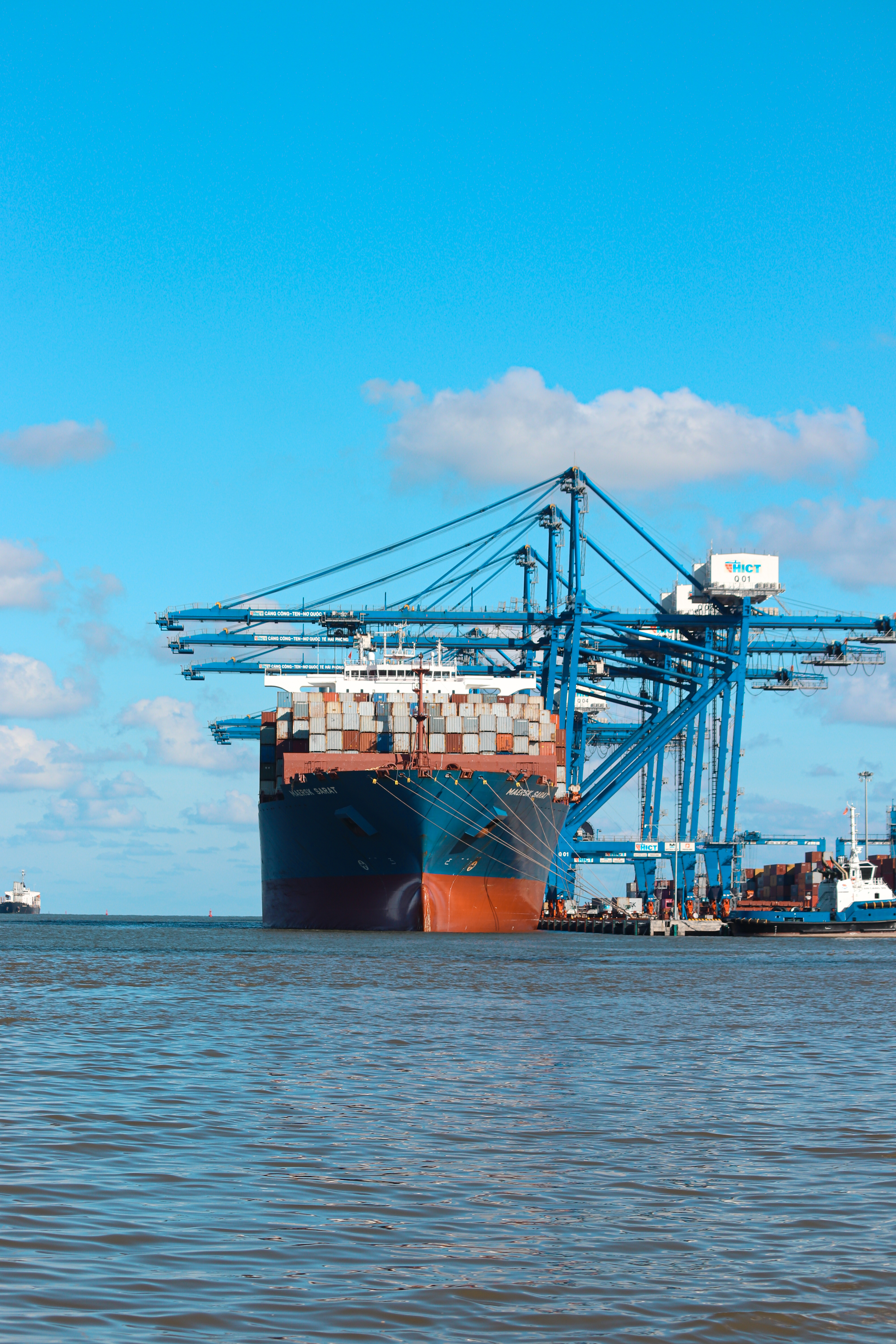
Container ship at the Hai Phong International Container Terminal 03
