= Điện Biên Đông district =

Điện Biên Đông District Huyện Điện Biên Đông
- District
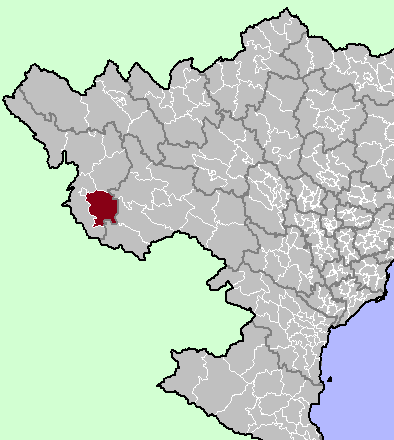
- District location in northern Vietnam
- Coordinates: 21°15′N 103°14′E
- Country: Vietnam
- Region: Northwest
- Province: Điện Biên
- Capital: Mường Luân

Area
  - Total: 466 sq mi (1,206 km^{2})

Population (2003)
  - Total: 48,990
- Time zone: UTC+7 (Indochina Time)

Điện Biên Đông is a former rural district of Điện Biên province in the Northwest region of Vietnam. The district is predominantly mountainous, and was established in 1995.

As of 2003, the district had a population of 48,990. It covers an area of 1,206 km^{2}. The capital lies at Mường Luân, although the only town in the district is Điện Biên Đông.

== Geography ==
The district lies in the southeastern part of Điện Biên Province, to the immediate southeast of Điện Biên Phủ City, south of Tuần Giáo district, east of Điện Biên district, north/northwest of Sốp Cộp district and west of Sông Mã district and Thuận Châu district in Sơn La province.

Điện Biên Đông is located at an average elevation of 900–1000 m. The land is dominated by many streams and mountains which account for 90% of natural land. The main river is the Nậm Mạ River which flows through the central part of the district. Điện Biên Đông has a tropical climate, influenced each year by two large air masses: the northern dry air, and the cold and hot humid air from the south. Average rainfall is from 1600–1700 mm, falling mostly in June, and the average temperature throughout the year is 22 degrees Celsius. The ethnic composition is as follows: Hmong (53.73%), Thai (32.06%), Lao (2.9%), Kho Mu (5.96%) and Sinh Mun (3.46%), with the remainder being minorities.

== Administrative divisions ==
Điện Biên Đông has 14 administrative units, including a township and 13 communes:

- Điện Biên Đông township
- Chiềng Sơ
- Háng Lìa
- Keo Lôm
- Luân Giới
- Mường Luân
- Na Son
- Nong U
- Phì Nhừ
- Phình Giàng
- Pu Nhi
- Pú Hồng
- Tìa Dình
- Xa Dung

== Economy ==
The main agricultural commodities are rice, corn, peanuts, betel nuts, cotton, tea and products from livestock farming. Điện Biên Đông district has reserves of gold ore, lead and zinc. Many of the Thai inhabitants live in two colonnade homes with wooden floors, usually along the streams and mainly farm rice and weave. There is a notable tower in the commune of Mường Luân, classified as a national monument in 1981. National Route 130 passes through the central part of the district.
