= Tuần Giáo district =

Coordinates: 21.667°N 103.333°E

Tuần Giáo District Huyện Tuần Giáo
- District
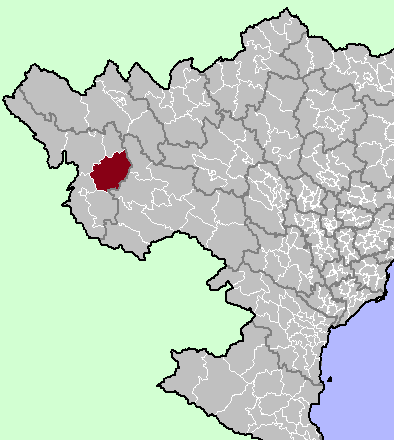
- District location in northern Vietnam
- Country: Vietnam
- Region: Northwest
- Province: Điện Biên
- Capital: Tuần Giáo

Area
  - Total: 438.72 sq mi (1,136.29 km^{2})

Population (2006)
  - Total: 71,423
  - Density: 160/sq mi (63/km^{2})
- Time zone: UTC+07:00 (Indochina Time)

Tuần Giáo is a former rural district of Điện Biên province in the Northwest region of Vietnam. As of 2006, the district had a population of 71,423. The district covers an area of 1,136.29 km^{2}. The district capital lies at Tuần Giáo.

On 24 June 1983, a 6.7 earthquake occurred in Tuần Giáo at around 14:00 local time, 11 km northeast of Tuần Giáo townlet, causing heavy losses to the Tuần Giáo district and surrounding areas. After the event, a series of aftershocks occurred, with the largest occurring on 15 July 1983 with a magnitude of 5.4.

In 2006, a portion of the district was carved out to form Mường Ảng district.

== Administrative divisions ==
Tuan Giao has 14 administrative units, including 1 town and 13 communes:

- Tuần Giáo (town)
- Chiềng Sinh
- Mùn Chung
- Mường Mùn
- Mường Thín
- Nà Sáy
- Phình Sáng
- Pú Nhung
- Quài Cang
- Quài Nưa
- Quài Tở
- Ta Ma
- Tênh Phông
- Tỏa Tình

== Climate ==
Climate data for Tuần Giáo, elevation 570 m (1,870 ft)
Month	Jan	Feb	Mar	Apr	May	Jun	Jul	Aug	Sep	Oct	Nov	Dec	Year
Record high °C (°F)	31.3 (88.3)	36.3 (97.3)	36.8 (98.2)	38.8 (101.8)	39.8 (103.6)	36.6 (97.9)	36.3 (97.3)	36.4 (97.5)	36.4 (97.5)	35.6 (96.1)	34.0 (93.2)	32.1 (89.8)	39.8 (103.6)
Mean daily maximum °C (°F)	22.4 (72.3)	24.7 (76.5)	28.1 (82.6)	30.6 (87.1)	31.1 (88.0)	30.6 (87.1)	30.2 (86.4)	30.4 (86.7)	30.2 (86.4)	28.4 (83.1)	25.5 (77.9)	22.9 (73.2)	27.9 (82.2)
Daily mean °C (°F)	15.1 (59.2)	16.8 (62.2)	19.9 (67.8)	23.0 (73.4)	24.8 (76.6)	25.4 (77.7)	25.3 (77.5)	25.1 (77.2)	24.2 (75.6)	22.0 (71.6)	18.7 (65.7)	15.4 (59.7)	21.3 (70.3)
Mean daily minimum °C (°F)	11.1 (52.0)	12.1 (53.8)	14.7 (58.5)	18.3 (64.9)	21.0 (69.8)	22.6 (72.7)	22.6 (72.7)	22.3 (72.1)	20.9 (69.6)	18.5 (65.3)	15.0 (59.0)	11.6 (52.9)	17.6 (63.7)
Record low °C (°F)	−0.6 (30.9)	2.7 (36.9)	4.1 (39.4)	10.3 (50.5)	13.9 (57.0)	14.3 (57.7)	19.0 (66.2)	17.1 (62.8)	11.5 (52.7)	7.7 (45.9)	3.6 (38.5)	−0.4 (31.3)	−0.6 (30.9)
Average rainfall mm (inches)	26.7 (1.05)	25.9 (1.02)	58.7 (2.31)	135.6 (5.34)	216.8 (8.54)	286.3 (11.27)	316.7 (12.47)	276.3 (10.88)	137.8 (5.43)	65.8 (2.59)	40.5 (1.59)	25.7 (1.01)	1,612.9 (63.50)
Average rainy days	4.8	4.2	6.5	13.2	17.4	21.3	23.2	21.2	13.7	8.9	5.8	3.9	144.4
Average relative humidity (%)	82.6	79.5	77.8	79.5	81.8	85.1	86.3	86.8	85.9	84.8	84.6	83.8	83.2
Mean monthly sunshine hours	141.8	152.0	178.3	199.0	193.2	132.4	132.7	149.5	162.4	158.8	150.1	145.9	1,896.3
Source: Vietnam Institute for Building Science and Technology

Climate data for Pha Din, elevation 1,347 m (4,419 ft)
Month	Jan	Feb	Mar	Apr	May	Jun	Jul	Aug	Sep	Oct	Nov	Dec	Year
Record high °C (°F)	29.3 (84.7)	31.8 (89.2)	36.0 (96.8)	36.5 (97.7)	36.6 (97.9)	35.5 (95.9)	36.0 (96.8)	33.8 (92.8)	32.6 (90.7)	31.4 (88.5)	31.2 (88.2)	29.1 (84.4)	36.6 (97.9)
Mean daily maximum °C (°F)	17.2 (63.0)	19.6 (67.3)	22.7 (72.9)	25.0 (77.0)	25.2 (77.4)	24.6 (76.3)	24.2 (75.6)	24.5 (76.1)	24.2 (75.6)	22.4 (72.3)	19.7 (67.5)	17.1 (62.8)	22.2 (72.0)
Daily mean °C (°F)	12.5 (54.5)	14.5 (58.1)	17.7 (63.9)	20.0 (68.0)	20.7 (69.3)	20.8 (69.4)	20.6 (69.1)	20.6 (69.1)	20.0 (68.0)	18.1 (64.6)	15.2 (59.4)	12.4 (54.3)	17.7 (63.9)
Mean daily minimum °C (°F)	9.8 (49.6)	11.3 (52.3)	14.3 (57.7)	16.6 (61.9)	17.9 (64.2)	18.7 (65.7)	18.7 (65.7)	18.6 (65.5)	17.7 (63.9)	15.8 (60.4)	12.7 (54.9)	10.0 (50.0)	15.2 (59.4)
Record low °C (°F)	−4.2 (24.4)	0.1 (32.2)	−0.1 (31.8)	5.9 (42.6)	11.0 (51.8)	13.1 (55.6)	14.0 (57.2)	15.0 (59.0)	10.9 (51.6)	8.3 (46.9)	4.2 (39.6)	−4.2 (24.4)	−4.2 (24.4)
Average rainfall mm (inches)	26.0 (1.02)	30.3 (1.19)	64.1 (2.52)	133.8 (5.27)	222.9 (8.78)	305.3 (12.02)	359.6 (14.16)	324.8 (12.79)	168.6 (6.64)	71.7 (2.82)	44.1 (1.74)	26.0 (1.02)	1,784.3 (70.25)
Average rainy days	5.7	5.4	7.5	13.7	17.9	22.0	24.4	22.3	15.6	10.1	6.8	4.6	155.9
Average relative humidity (%)	81.4	75.8	71.1	75.5	83.0	89.7	91.4	90.5	86.9	86.0	83.9	81.9	83.2
Mean monthly sunshine hours	179.7	172.6	205.9	213.4	192.5	119.7	125.6	140.5	162.4	164.9	162.7	180.9	2,019.9
Source: Vietnam Institute for Building Science and Technology
