= Tủa Chùa district =

Coordinates: 22.000°N 103.333°E

Tủa Chùa District Huyện Tủa Chùa
- District
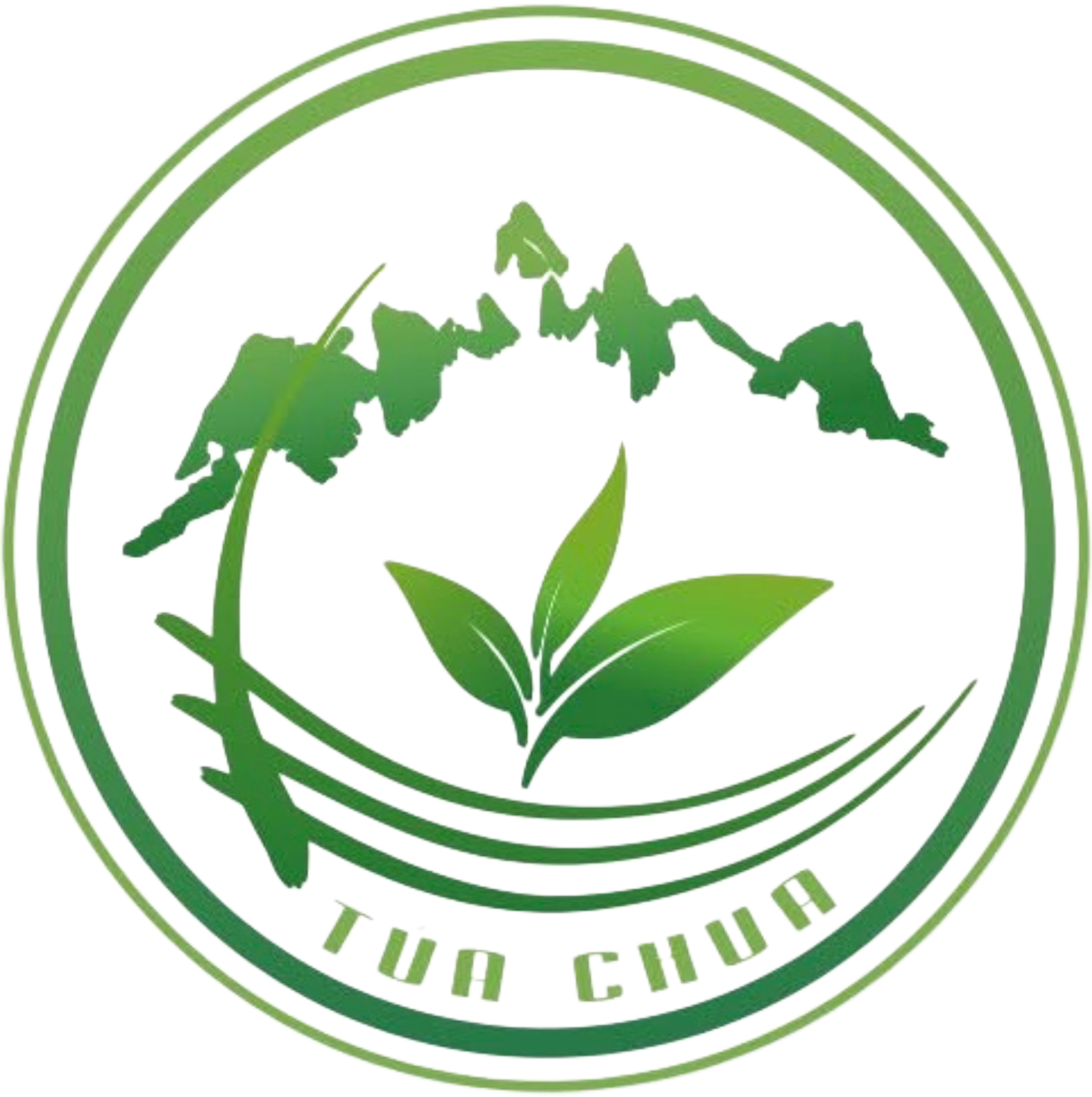
- Seal

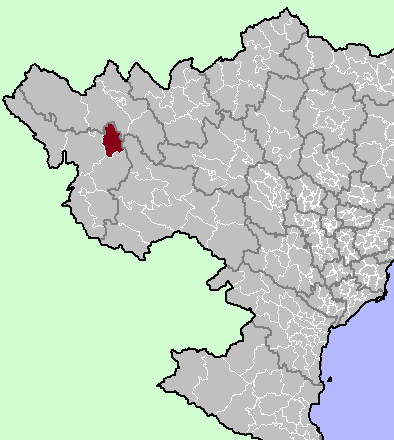
- District location in northern Vietnam
- Country: Vietnam
- Region: Northwest
- Province: Điện Biên
- Capital: Tủa Chùa

Area
  - Total: 262 sq mi (679 km^{2})

Population (2003)
  - Total: 42,366
- Time zone: UTC+7 (Indochina Time)

Tủa Chùa is a former rural district of Điện Biên province in the Northwest region of Vietnam. As of 2003, the district had a population of 42,366. The district covers an area of 679 km^{2}. The district capital lies at Tủa Chùa.

== Administrative divisions ==
Tua Chua has 12 administrative units, including 1 town and 11 communes:

- Tủa Chùa (town)
- Huổi Só
- Lao Xả Phình
- Mường Báng
- Mường Đun
- Sín Chải
- Sính Phình
- Tả Phìn
- Tả Sìn Thàng
- Trung Thu
- Tủa Thàng
- Xá Nhè
