= 2025 Điện Biên province floods =

Vietnamese 2025 flood disaster

The 2025 Điện Biên province floods were caused by extended periods of heavy rainfall between late July and early August. The rains triggered widespread flash floods and landslides, particularly affecting mountainous communes such as Xa Dung and Hang Pu Xi. The floods resulted in significant damage to homes and infrastructure, displacing numerous residents and isolating communities. In response, the Vietnamese government allocated substantial funding for relief and recovery efforts, including reconstruction projects and resettlement initiatives.

== Background and impact ==
The 2025 floods in Điện Biên province, Vietnam, were primarily triggered by prolonged heavy rainfall that began in late July and intensified into early August. The provincial hydro-meteorological station reported that moderate to heavy rains persisted over 12 hours, with some areas experiencing very heavy rainfall. This sustainment led to flash floods and landslides across several communes, including Xa Dung and Hang Pu Xi. The mountainous terrain of Điện Biên increased the impact of the rains. The runoff from saturated soil contributed to the onset of the flash floods and mudslides, which overwhelmed low-lying areas and isolated numerous villages. The heavy rainfall led to the collapse of over 319 houses, primarily in Na Son, Phinh Giang, and Xa Dung.

== Aftermath ==
In response to the disaster, the Vietnamese government allocated VND 250 billion from the national budget reserves to support affected provinces, including Điện Biên, Sơn La, and Nghệ An. Of this, Điện Biên received VND 100 billion to aid in initial recovery efforts, including restoring essential infrastructure and stabilizing residents' lives.

Prime Minister Phạm Minh Chính visited the province on 3 August to inspect the damage and direct recovery operations. He met with residents in severely affected areas and commended the efforts of local police, military personnel, and militia in rescue operations.

=== Reconstruction ===
The construction of 80 new homes for families whose houses were destroyed or are located in unsafe areas has been initiated. Two resettlement sites, totaling 6.2 hectares in Xa Dũng and Tìa Dình communes, have been approved, with construction being expedited with military support to ensure safety and durability.
