= Nậm Pồ district =

Nậm Pồ district Huyện Nậm Pồ
- District
- Interactive map of Nậm Pồ district
- Country: Vietnam
- Region: Northwest
- Province: Điện Biên
- Capital: Nà Hỳ

Area
  - Total: 578.43 sq mi (1,498.12 km^{2})

Population (2012)
  - Total: 43,542
  - Density: 75/sq mi (29/km^{2})
- Time zone: UTC+07:00 (Indochina Time)

Nậm Pồ is a former rural district in Điện Biên province in the Northwest region of Vietnam. As of 2012, the district had a population of 43,542. The district covers an area of 1,498.12 km^{2}. The district capital lies at Nà Hỳ commune.

Nậm Pồ district was formed from portions of Mường Chà district and Mường Nhé district on August 25, 2012.

The district is divided into 15 rural communes, including: Chà Cang, Chà Nưa, Chà Tở, Na Cô Sa, Nà Bủng, Nà Hỳ, Nà Khoa, Nậm Chua, Nậm Khăn, Nậm Nhừ, Nậm Tin, Pa Tần, Phìn Hồ, Si Pa Phìn and Vàng Đán.
