= Mường Nhé district =

Coordinates: 22°11′30″N 102°27′20″E

Mường Nhé District Huyện Mường Nhé
- District
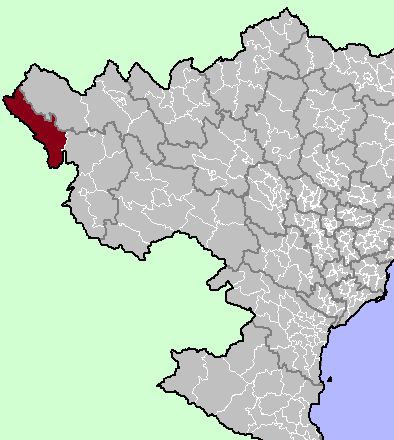
- District location in northern Vietnam
- Country: Vietnam
- Region: Northwest
- Province: Điện Biên
- Capital: Mường Nhé

Area
  - Total: 607.62 sq mi (1,573.73 km^{2})

Population (2019 census)
  - Total: 45,727
  - Density: 75.256/sq mi (29.056/km^{2})
- Time zone: UTC+07:00 (Indochina Time)

Mường Nhé is a former rural district of Điện Biên province in the Northwest region of Vietnam. As of 2019, the district had a population of 45,727. The district covers an area of 1,573.73 km^{2}. The district capital lies at Mường Nhé commune. It contains the 182,000 hectare Mường Nhé Nature Reserve.

On 25 August 2012, the eastern portion of the district was carved out to form Nậm Pồ district.

== Administrative divisions ==
Mường Nhé district is divided into 11 rural communes, including:

- Chung Chải
- Huổi Lếch
- Leng Su Sìn
- Mường Nhé (district capital)
- Mường Toong
- Nậm Kè
- Nậm Vì
- Pá Mỳ
- Quảng Lâm
- Sen Thượng
- Sín Thầu

== History ==
The district was established on 14 January 2002.

In late April 2011, 7,000 people, most of them ethnic Hmong Christians, demonstrated against the government in Huổi Khon and neighboring villages, some of whom were calling for an independent Hmong kingdom. Police and army were quick to dissipate the unrest.

On 13 March 2012, eight ethnic Hmong men who allegedly traveled to Mường Nhé in 2011 to pray and await the arrival of a new king were jailed for up to 30 months, having been found guilty of "disturbing public order" by attempting to set up an independent Hmong kingdom in Mường Nhé. The government media claimed the culprits were illiterate and blamed the unrest to a "millenarian plot".
