= Mường Chà district =

Coordinates: 21°43′40″N 103°04′49″E

Mường Chà District Huyện Mường Chà
- District
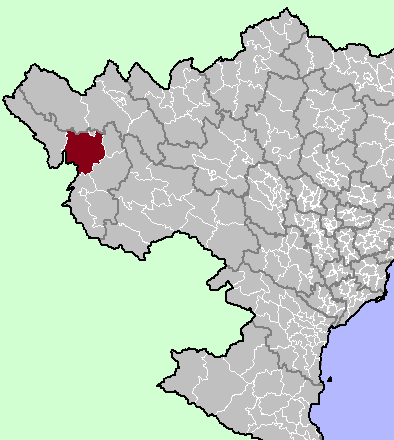
- Mường Chà district location in northern Vietnam
- Country: Vietnam
- Region: Northwest
- Province: Điện Biên
- Capital: Mường Chà

Area
  - Total: 463.10 sq mi (1,199.42 km^{2})

Population (2012)
  - Total: 39,456
  - Density: 85/sq mi (33/km^{2})
- Time zone: UTC+7 (Indochina Time)

Mường Chà is a former rural district of Điện Biên province in the Northwest region of Vietnam. As of 2012 the district had a population of 39,456. The district covers an area of 1,199.42 km^{2}. The district capital lies at Mường Chà.

On 25 August 2012, the western portion of the district was carved out to form Nậm Pồ district.

== Administrative divisions ==
Mường Chà has 12 administrative units, including 1 town and 11 communes:

- Mường Chà town
- Huổi Lèng
- Huổi Mí
- Hừa Ngài
- Ma Thì Hồ
- Mường Mươn
- Mường Tùng
- Na Sang
- Nậm Nèn
- Pa Ham
- Sa Lông
- Sá Tổng
