= Chiềng Sinh =

Chiềng Sinh may refer to several places in Vietnam, including:

- Chiềng Sinh, Sơn La, a ward of Sơn La province
- Chiềng Sinh, Điện Biên, a commune of Điện Biên province
