= List of extreme points of Vietnam =

The extreme points of Vietnam include the northernmost, southernmost, easternmost, and westernmost locations in Vietnam's territory, as well as the highest and the lowest altitudes in Vietnam. Because Vietnam is located in the eastern Indochinese Peninsula, the northernmost point and the westernmost point both lie on the land, and there are two southernmost points and two easternmost points along and inside the South China Sea. Vietnam stretches along the coast of the South China Sea, with the northernmost point being more than 1,650 km from the southernmost. Most extreme points are not in dispute with any other countries; only one extreme point, Tennent Reef, is disputed by China, Taiwan, and the Philippines as a part of the Spratly Islands dispute (though Tennent Reef is currently administered by Vietnam).

The latitude and longitude are expressed in decimal degree notation, in which a positive latitude value refers to the northern hemisphere, and a negative value refers to the southern hemisphere. Similarly, a positive longitude value refers to the eastern hemisphere, and a negative value refers to the western hemisphere. The coordinates used in this article are sourced from Google Earth, which makes use of the WGS84 geodetic reference system. Additionally, a negative altitude value refers to land below sea level.

== Extreme points ==
Color Notes

extreme points on mainland (2) extreme points on coast (2) extreme points on sea (2)

#	Heading	Location	Administrative entity	Bordering entity	Coordinates (Note: Coordinates obtained from Google Earth. Google Earth makes use of the WGS84 geodetic reference system.)	Ref	Image
1	North	Lũng Cú commune, Đồng Văn district	Hà Giang	Yunnan, China	23.392505°N 105.323240°E		Cột cờ Lũng Cú.
2	West	A Pa Chải-Tá Miếu (Sín Thầu, Mường Nhé district)	Điện Biên	Border tripoint Vietnam-China-Laos (Điện Biên–Yunnan–Phongsaly)	22.400734°N 102.143940°E		
3	South (on mainland)	Cape Cà Mau, Ngọc Hiển district	Cà Mau	South China Sea	8.623°N 104.71°E		Mũi Cà Mau.
4	South (at sea)	at Amboyna Cay, Spratly Islands, Trường Sa District	Khánh Hòa	South China Sea	7.8909°N 112.9210°E (approximately)		
5	East (on mainland)	Cape Đôi on Hòn Gốm peninsula, Vân Phong Bay, Vạn Thạnh, Vạn Ninh district	Khánh Hòa	South China Sea	12.6483756°N 109.4616339°E		
6	East (at sea)	at Tennent Reef, Spratly Islands, Trường Sa District	Khánh Hòa	South China Sea	8.855°N 114.655°E		Da Tien Nu.

== Altitudes ==
#	Extremity	Name	Altitude	Location	Province	Coordinates	Ref	Image
1	Highest	Phan Xi Păng	3,143 m (10,312 ft)	Hoàng Liên Sơn, northwest of Việt Nam	between Lào Cai and Lai Châu province	22.304276°N 103.777063°E		Fansipan
2	Lowest	sea surface	0 m	South China Sea	-	-		East sea, cape mũi Né.

== See also ==
- Geography of Vietnam
- Extreme points of Asia
- List of extreme points of India
- List of extreme points of Japan
