= Nà Bủng =

- Commune and village
- Country: Vietnam
- Province: Điện Biên
- District: Nậm Pồ
- Time zone: UTC+07:00 (Indochina Time)

Nà Bủng is a commune (xã) and village of the Nậm Pồ District of Điện Biên Province, northwestern Vietnam.

Since 1 July 2025, the commune is managed by Tax Sub-district 5 of the Điện Biên Provincial Tax Department, with its headquarters located in Mường Nha commune, Điên Biên province.
