= Núa Ngam =

Coordinates: 21.2175°N 103.0519°E

- Commune and village
- Interactive map of Núa Ngam
- Country: Vietnam
- Province: Điện Biên
- District: Điện Biên
- Established: 1955
- Time zone: UTC+07:00 (Indochina Time)

Núa Ngam is a commune (xã) and village of the Điện Biên District of Điện Biên Province, northwestern Vietnam.

Đoàn Kết commune, now called Núa Ngam commune, was established in 1955.
