= Nà Tấu =

Coordinates: 21.5300°N 103.0975°E

- Commune and village
- Interactive map of Nà Tấu
- Country: Vietnam
- Province: Điện Biên
- District: Điện Biên
- Time zone: UTC+07:00 (Indochina Time)

Nà Tấu is a commune (xã) and village of the Điện Biên District of Điện Biên Province, northwestern Vietnam.
