= Mường Thanh =

Coordinates: 21.3869°N 103.0156°E

- Ward
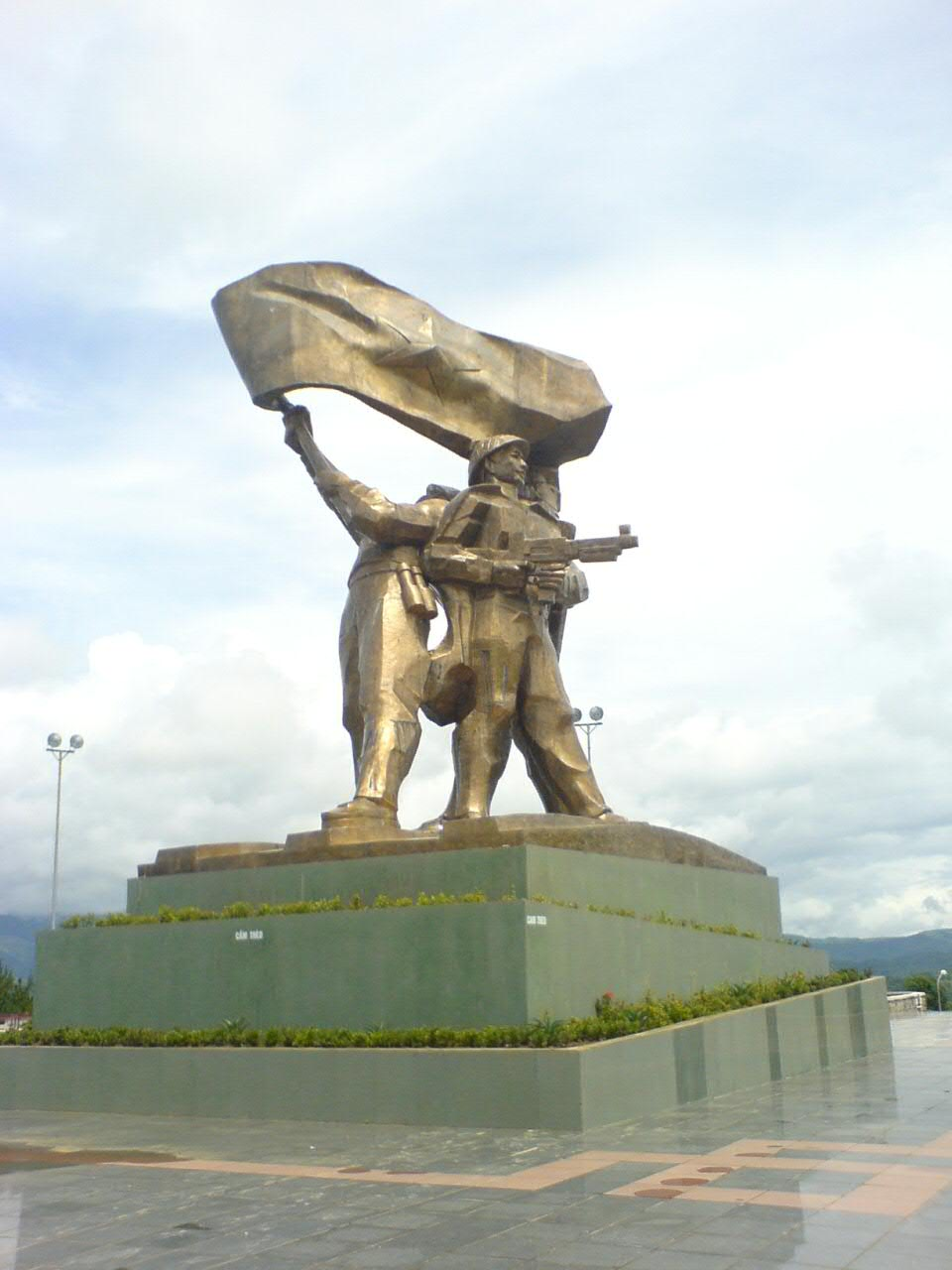
- Điện Biên Phủ Monument
- Interactive map of Mường Thanh
- Country: Vietnam
- Province: Điện Biên

Area
  - Total: 27.56 km^{2} (10.64 sq mi)

Population (2025)
  - Total: 25,517
  - Density: 925.9/km^{2} (2,398/sq mi)
- Time zone: UTC+07:00 (Indochina Time)
- Postal code: 03136

Mường Thanh is a ward (phường) of Điện Biên Province in northwestern Vietnam. It was a township of Điện Biên District before it was incorporated into Điện Biên Phủ city.

Mường Thanh is named after Muang Theng or Müang Thaeng, which was, according to the Khun Borom creation myth, the original home of the Tai peoples (Lao, Thai, Shan, upland Tai peoples).

Until the 1950s, Mường Thanh was the centre of an autonomous chiefdom of the Tai Dam ("Black Tai"), one of the 12 cantons of the confederation Sip Song Chau Tai.

The Standing Committee of the National Assembly promulgated Resolution No. 1661/NQ-UBTVQH15 on the reorganization of commune-level administrative units of Điện Biên Province in 2025 (the resolution takes effect from June 16, 2025). Accordingly, the entire natural area and population of Noong Bua Ward, Nam Thanh Ward (formerly thuộc Điện Biên Phủ City), and Thanh Xương Commune (formerly thuộc Điện Biên District) are reorganized to form a new ward named Mường Thanh Ward.
