= Thanh Nưa =

Coordinates: 21.4536°N 102.9536°E

- Commune and village
- Interactive map of Thanh Nưa
- Country: Vietnam
- Province: Điện Biên
- Time zone: UTC+07:00 (Indochina Time)

Thanh Nưa is a commune (xã) and village of the Điện Biên Province, northwestern Vietnam.

The entire natural area and population of Hua Thanh Commune, Thanh Luông Commune, Thanh Hưng Commune, Thanh Chăn Commune, and Thanh Nưa Commune are reorganized to form a new administrative unit named Thanh Nưa Commune.
