= Thanh Yên =

Coordinates: 21.3372°N 102.9769°E

- Commune and village
- Interactive map of Thanh Yên
- Country: Vietnam
- Province: Điện Biên
- Established: 1965

Area
  - Total: 19.79 km^{2} (7.64 sq mi)

Population (2022)
  - Total: 7,449
  - Density: 376/km^{2} (970/sq mi)
- Time zone: UTC+07:00 (Indochina Time)
- Postal code: 03346

Thanh Yên is a commune (xã) and village of the Điện Biên Province, northwestern Vietnam.

The entire natural area and population of Noong Luống Commune, Pa Thơm Commune, and Thanh Yên Commune are reorganized to form a new commune named Thanh Yên Commune.
