= Mường Toong =

- Commune and village
- Interactive map of Mường Toong
- Country: Vietnam
- Province: Điện Biên
- District: Mường Nhé
- Time zone: UTC+07:00 (Indochina Time)

Mường Toong is a commune (xã) and village of the Mường Nhé District of Điện Biên Province, northwestern Vietnam.

On July 1, 2025, the entire natural area and population of Huồi Lệch and Mường Toong communes to form new Mường Toong commune.
