= Mường Ảng =

- Commune-level town
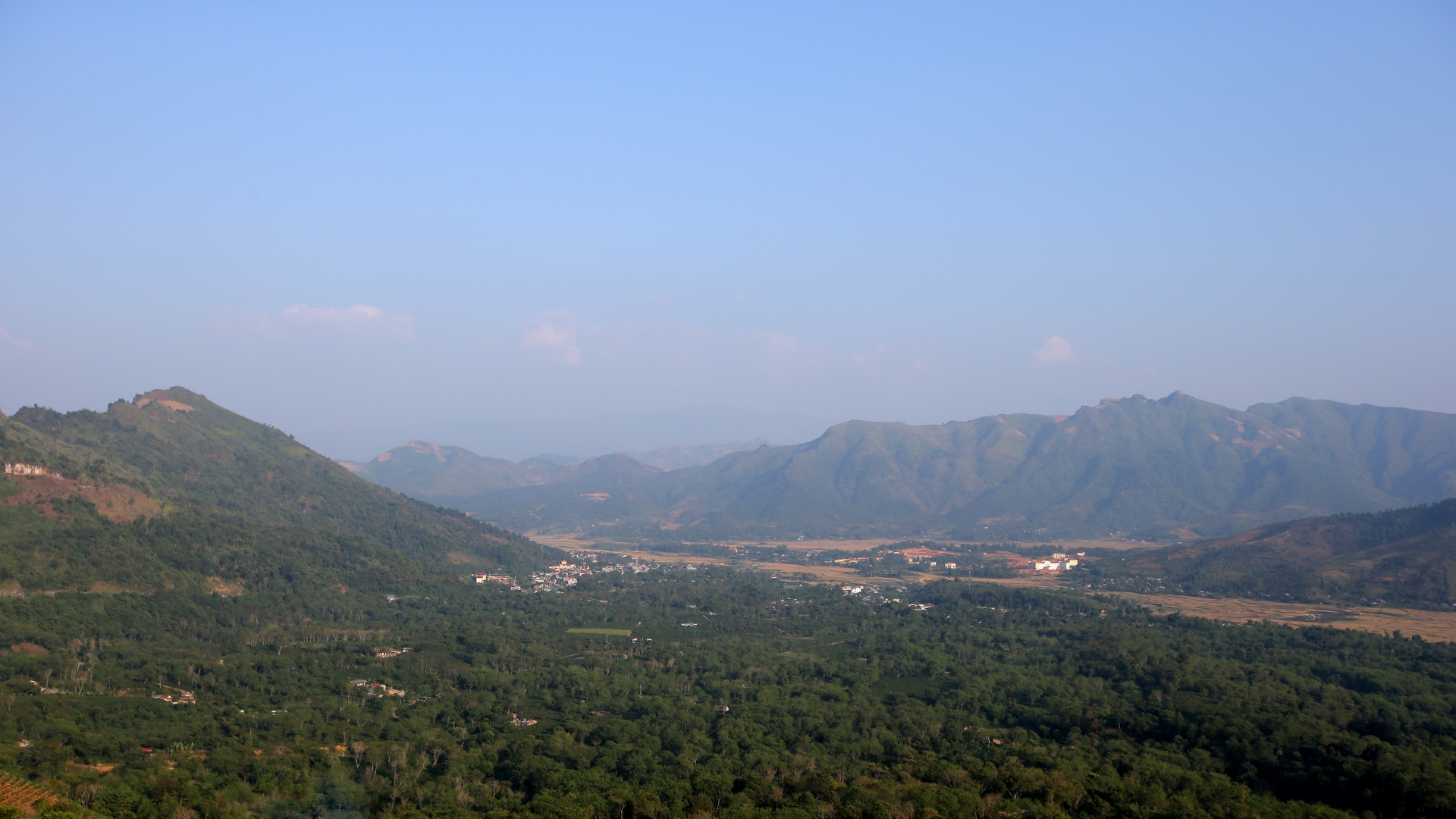
- Hills in Mường Ảng

- Location in Vietnam
- Coordinates: 21°31′12″N 103°13′22″E
- Country: Vietnam
- Province: Điện Biên
- District: Mường Ảng
- Established: 1997

Area
  - Total: 85.94 km^{2} (33.18 sq mi)

Population (2025)
  - Total: 17,604
  - Density: 204.8/km^{2} (530.5/sq mi)
- Time zone: UTC+07:00 (Indochina Time)

Mường Ảng is a commune-level town (thị trấn) and capital of Mường Ảng District of Điện Biên Province, northwestern Vietnam. Mường is equivalent to Mueang.
