= Trung Thu =

Trung Thu may refer to:

- Mid-Autumn Festival
- Trung Thu, Dien Bien, Vietnam
