= Phìn Hồ =

Phìn Hồ may refer to several places in Vietnam:

- Phìn Hồ, Điện Biên, a rural commune of Nậm Pồ District
- Phìn Hồ, Lai Châu, a rural commune of Sìn Hồ District
