= Mường Luân =

- Rural commune and village
- Location in Vietnam
- Coordinates: 21°25′N 103°19′E
- Country: Vietnam
- Province: Điện Biên

Area
  - Total: 62.4 km^{2} (24.1 sq mi)

Population
  - Total: 3,473
  - Density: 0.56/km^{2} (1.5/sq mi)
- Time zone: UTC+07:00 (Indochina Time)

Mường Luân is a rural commune (xã) and village of Điện Biên Province, northwestern Vietnam. It lies about 100 km from Điện Biên Đông town. The commune covers an area of 62.4 square kilometres and has a reported population of 3473. The average elevation of the commune is 1,700m. A reported 36% of the population live below the poverty line. The village itself has a population of about 600 people in 80 households.

A 25-meter wide irrigation dam and irrigation canal has been built within the commune, first proposed project by the Foundation for Microprojects in Vietnam with the provincial authorities in August 1999. Completed in April 2001, the dam is 2.8 meters high with a 1,680 meter canal (80 meters cement and 1,600 meters dirt) and irrigates some 22 hectares of rice fields, a 2.5-hectare (6.2-acre) fish pond. The irrigation scheme has a target to increase rice production from 2.75 to 3.55 metric tons annually per hectare.

The Standing Committee of the National Assembly promulgated Resolution No. 1661/NQ-UBTVQH15 on the rearrangement of commune-level administrative units of Điện Biên Province in 2025 (the Resolution takes effect from 16 June 2025). Accordingly, the entire natural area and population of Chiềng Sơ Commune, Luân Giói Commune, and Mường Luân Commune are rearranged to form a new commune named Mường Luân Commune.
