= Nhung =

Nhung is a given name. Notable people called Nhung include:

- Âu Hồng Nhung (born 1993), member of the Vietnam women's national volleyball team
- Bùi Thị Nhung (born 1983), Vietnamese high jumper
- Hồng Nhung (born 1970), Vietnamese singer
- Khương Thị Hồng Nhung (born 1972), Vietnamese chess player, Woman International Master
- Lê Ngọc Nguyên Nhung (born 1984), Vietnamese badminton player
- Nguyễn Văn Nhung (1919–1964), officer in the Army of the Republic of Vietnam (ARVN)
- Phi Nhung (1970–2021), Vietnamese-American singer, actress and humanitarian
- Trần Thị Hồng Nhung (born 1992), Vietnamese footballer
- Trần Văn Nhung (1933–2020), Vietnamese footballer who played for the South Vietnam national team
- Vũ Thị Nhung (born 1992), Vietnamese footballer

== See also ==
- Pú Nhung, commune (xã) and village in Điện Biên Province, northwestern Vietnam
- Nhung Nu Hon Ruc Ro (Burning Kisses), a 2010 Vietnamese film
