= Sam Mứn =

Coordinates: 21°16′N 103°01′E

- Commune and village
- Interactive map of Sam Mứn
- Country: Vietnam
- Province: Điện Biên
- Time zone: UTC+07:00 (Indochina Time)

Sam Mứn is a commune (xã) and village of the Điện Biên Province, northwestern Vietnam.

The entire natural area and population of Pom Lót Commune and Na Ư Commune are reorganized to form a new commune named Sam Mứn Commune.
