= Quài Tở =

Coordinates: 21.5539°N 103.4608°E

- Commune and village
- Interactive map of Quài Tở
- Country: Vietnam
- Province: Điện Biên
- Time zone: UTC+7 (UTC+7)

Quài Tở is a commune (xã) and village of the Điện Biên Province, northwestern Vietnam.

The entire natural area and population of Tỏa Tình Commune, Tênh Phông Commune, and Quài Tở Commune are reorganized to form a new administrative unit named Quài Tở Commune.
