= Điện Biên district =

Điện Biên District Huyện Điện Biên
- District
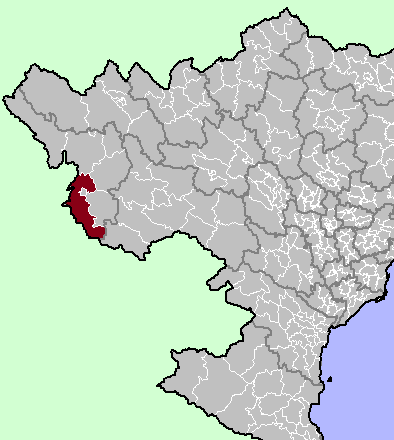
- District location in northern Vietnam
- Country: Vietnam
- Region: Northwest
- Province: Điện Biên
- Capital: Thanh Xương

Area
  - Total: 1,395.99 km^{2} (538.99 sq mi)

Population (2019)
  - Total: 93,850
  - Density: 67.23/km^{2} (174.1/sq mi)
- Time zone: UTC+7 (Indochina Time)

Điện Biên is a former district of Vietnam's Điện Biên province. As of 2019, it had a population of 93,850 people, covering an area of 1395.99 km^{2}, making it the most populous district in the province. The district capital lies at Thanh Xương. It is bordered by Sơn La province, Mường Chà district, Điện Biên Đông district, Điện Biên Phủ, and Phongsaly province of Laos.

== Administrative divisions ==
The district is officially divided into 21 commune-level sub-divisions (Hẹ Muông, Hua Thanh, Mường Lói, Mường Nhà, Mường Pồn, Na Tông, Na Ư, Noong Hẹt, Noong Luống, Núa Ngam, Pa Thơm, Phu Luông, Pom Lót, Sam Mứn, Thanh An, Thanh Chăn, Thanh Hưng, Thanh Luông, Thanh Nưa, Thanh Xương, Thanh Yên).
