= Nà Hỳ =

Coordinates: 19°34′N 104°32′E

- Commune and village
- Interactive map of Nà Hỳ
- Country: Vietnam
- Province: Điện Biên
- Time zone: UTC+07:00 (Indochina Time)

Nà Hỳ is a commune (xã) and village of the Điện Biên Province, northwestern Vietnam.

The Standing Committee of the National Assembly issued Resolution No. 1661/NQ-UBTVQH15 on the reorganization of commune-level administrative units of Điện Biên Province in 2025 (effective from 16 June 2025). Accordingly, the entire natural area and population of Nà Khoa Commune, Nậm Nhừ Commune, Nậm Chua Commune, and Nà Hỳ Commune are reorganized to form a new commune named Nà Hỳ Commune.
