= Mường Ảng district =

Coordinates: 21°31′18″N 103°13′52″E

Mường Ảng district Huyện Mường Ảng
- District
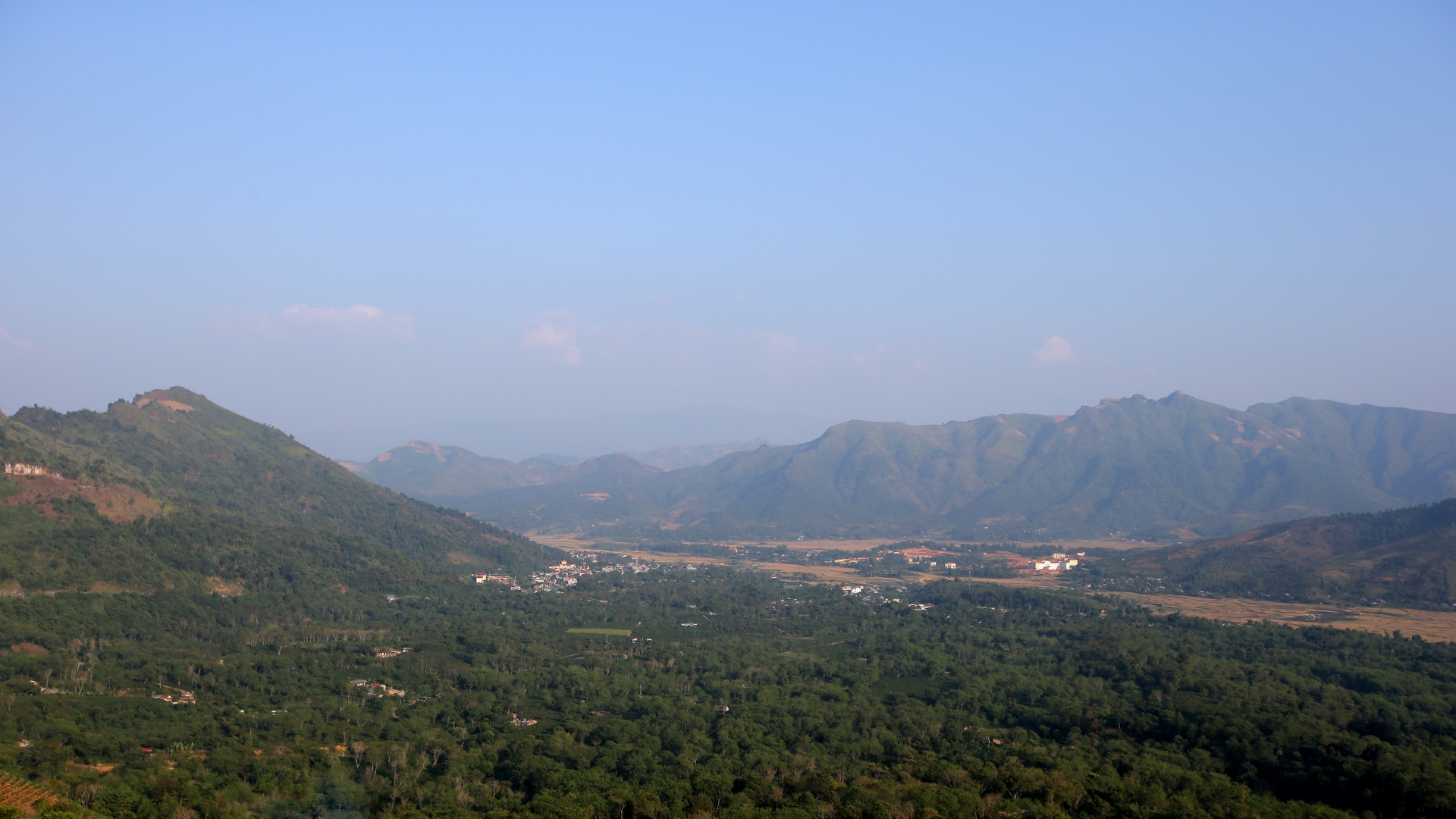
- View of the mountains on way from Điện Biên Phủ to Sơn La
- Interactive map of Mường Ảng district
- Country: Vietnam
- Region: Northwest
- Province: Dien Bien
- Capital: Mường Ảng

Area
  - Total: 171.1 sq mi (443.2 km^{2})

Population (2006)
  - Total: 37,077
  - Density: 220/sq mi (84/km^{2})
- Time zone: UTC+07:00 (Indochina Time)

Mường Ảng is a former rural district (huyện) of Điện Biên province in the Northwest region of Vietnam.

As of 2006, the district had a population 37,077. The district covers an area of 443.2 km^{2}. The district capital lies at Mường Ảng town.

Mường Ảng is subdivided to a township and 9 rural communes, including Mường Ảng township and the communes of Ẳng Cang, Ẳng Nưa, Ẳng Tở, Búng Lao, Mường Đăng, Mường Lạn, Nặm Lịch, Ngối Cáy and Xuân Lao.
