= Tuần Giáo =

- Commune
- Location in Vietnam
- Coordinates: 21°35′N 103°25′E
- Country: Vietnam
- Province: Điện Biên
- Established: 7 April 1965

Area
  - Total: 17.6 km^{2} (6.8 sq mi)

Population (2009)
  - Total: 7,258
  - Density: 412/km^{2} (1,070/sq mi)
- Time zone: UTC+07:00 (Indochina Time)
- Climate: Cwa

Tuần Giáo is a commune (xã) of Điện Biên Province, northwestern Vietnam.

The entire natural area and population of Tuần Giáo Township, Quài Cang Commune, and Quài Nưa Commune are reorganized to form a new administrative unit named Tuần Giáo Commune.
