= Mường Nhà =

- Commune and village
- Location in Vietnam
- Coordinates: 21°8′15″N 103°5′40″E
- Country: Vietnam
- Province: Điện Biên
- Time zone: UTC+07:00 (Indochina Time)

Mường Nhà is a commune (xã) and village of the Điện Biên Province, northwestern Vietnam. It lies north by road from Mường Lói. The commune has problems with narcotics smuggling and addiction, being located near the Laotian border.

The Standing Committee of the National Assembly promulgated Resolution No. 1661/NQ-UBTVQH15 on the rearrangement of commune-level administrative units of Điện Biên Province in 2025 (the Resolution takes effect from 16 June 2025). Accordingly, the entire natural area and population of Mường Lói Commune, Phu Luông Commune, and Mường Nhà Commune are rearranged to form a new commune named Mường Nhà Commune.
