= Pu Nhi =

Coordinates: 21.3458°N 103.1519°E

- Commune and village
- Interactive map of Pu Nhi
- Country: Vietnam
- Province: Điện Biên

Area
  - Total: 100 km^{2} (39 sq mi)

Population (2005)
  - Total: 3,567
  - Density: 35/km^{2} (91/sq mi)
- Time zone: UTC+07:00 (Indochina Time)

Pu Nhi is a commune (xã) and village of the Điện Biên Province, northwestern Vietnam.

The Standing Committee of the National Assembly promulgated Resolution No. 1661/NQ-UBTVQH15 on the reorganization of commune-level administrative units of Điện Biên Province in 2025 (the resolution takes effect from June 16, 2025). Accordingly, the entire natural area and population of Nong U Commune and Pu Nhi Commune are reorganized to form a new commune named Pu Nhi Commune.
