= Chà Tở =

Coordinates: 21°59′10″N 102°56′24″E

- Commune and village
- Interactive map of Chà Tở
- Country: Vietnam
- Province: Điện Biên

Area
  - Total: 227.92 km^{2} (88.00 sq mi)

Population (2025)
  - Total: 5,208
  - Density: 22.85/km^{2} (59.18/sq mi)
- Time zone: UTC+07:00 (Indochina Time)
- Administrative code: 03175

Chà Tở is a commune (xã) and village of the Điện Biên Province, northwestern Vietnam.

The Standing Committee of the National Assembly promulgated Resolution No. 1661/NQ-UBTVQH15 on the reorganization of commune-level administrative units of Điện Biên Province in 2025 (the resolution takes effect from June 16, 2025). Accordingly, the entire natural area and population of Nậm Khăn Commune and Chà Tở Commune are reorganized to form a new commune named Chà Tở Commune.
