= Chiềng An =

Chiềng An Phường Chiềng An
- Ward
- Interactive map of Chiềng An
- Location in Vietnam
- Country: Vietnam
- Regions: Northwest
- Province: Sơn La Province
- Established: June 16, 2025

Area
  - Total: 149.08 km^{2} (57.56 sq mi)

Population (2025)
  - Total: 20,322
  - Density: 136.32/km^{2} (353.06/sq mi)
- Time zone: UTC+07:00 (Indochina Time)

Chiềng An is a ward (phường) of Sơn La Province, Vietnam.

== Geography ==
Chiềng An Ward located in central Sơn La Province, and adjacent to:

- Mường Khiêng Commune and Chiềng La Commune to the north
- Chiềng Cơi Ward and Tô Hiệu Ward to the south
- Muổi Nọi Commune and Thuận Châu Commune to the west
- Chiềng Sinh Ward and Mường Bú Commune to the east.

== History ==
On June 16, 2025, the Standing Committee of the National Assembly of Vietnam issued Resolution No. 1681/NQ-UBTVQH15 on the arrangement of commune-level administrative units of Sơn La Province in 2025 (effective from June 16, 2025). Accordingly, the entire land area and population of Chiềng An Ward, Chiềng Xôm Commune and Chiềng Đen Commune were merged to form a new ward named Chiềng An Ward.
