= Chiềng Cơi =

Chiềng Cơi Phường Chiềng Cơi
- Ward
- View of Chiềng Cơi Ward
- Interactive map of Chiềng Cơi
- Location in Vietnam
- Country: Vietnam
- Regions: Northwest
- Province: Sơn La Province
- Established: June 16, 2025

Area
  - Total: 93.56 km^{2} (36.12 sq mi)

Population (2025)
  - Total: 22,694
  - Density: 242.6/km^{2} (628.2/sq mi)
- Time zone: UTC+07:00 (Indochina Time)

Chiềng Cơi is a ward (phường) of Sơn La Province, Vietnam. It is the capital of Sơn La Province.

== Geography ==
Chiềng Cơi Ward located in central Sơn La Province, and adjacent to:

- Chiềng An Ward to the north
- Chiềng Mai Commune and Mường Chanh Commune to the south
- Muổi Nọi Commune to the west
- Chiềng Sinh Ward and Tô Hiệu Ward to the east.

== History ==
On June 16, 2025, the Standing Committee of the National Assembly of Vietnam issued Resolution No. 1681/NQ-UBTVQH15 on the arrangement of commune-level administrative units of Sơn La Province in 2025 (effective from June 16, 2025). Accordingly, the entire land area and population of Chiềng Cơi Ward, Hua La Commune and Chiềng Cọ Commune were merged to form a new ward named Chiềng Cơi Ward.
