= Mường Tùng =

Coordinates: 21°58′N 103°08′E

- Commune and village
- Interactive map of Mường Tùng
- Country: Vietnam
- Province: Điện Biên
- Time zone: UTC+07:00 (Indochina Time)

Mường Tùng is a commune (xã) and village of the Điện Biên Province, northwestern Vietnam.

The Standing Committee of the National Assembly promulgated Resolution No. 1661/NQ-UBTVQH15 on the rearrangement of commune-level administrative units of Điện Biên Province in 2025 (the Resolution takes effect from 16 June 2025). Accordingly, the entire natural area and population of Huổi Lèng Commune and Mường Tùng Commune are rearranged to form a new commune named Mường Tùng Commune.
