= Mường Mùn =

Coordinates: 21.7256°N 103.2672°E

- Commune and village
- Interactive map of Mường Mùn
- Country: Vietnam
- Province: Điện Biên
- Time zone: UTC+7 (UTC+7)

Mường Mùn is a commune (xã) and village of the Điện Biên Province, northwestern Vietnam.

The Standing Committee of the National Assembly promulgated Resolution No. 1661/NQ-UBTVQH15 on the reorganization of commune-level administrative units of Điện Biên Province in 2025 (effective from June 16, 2025). Accordingly, the entire natural area and population of Mùn Chung Commune, Pú Xi Commune, and Mường Mùn Commune are rearranged to form a new commune named Mường Mùn Commune.
