= Sín Chải =

Coordinates: 22.0989°N 103.3372°E

- Commune and village
- Interactive map of Sín Chải
- Country: Vietnam
- Province: Điện Biên
- Time zone: UTC+7 (UTC+7)

Sín Chải is a commune (xã) and village of the Điện Biên Province, northwestern Vietnam.

The entire natural area and population of Tả Sìn Thàng Commune, Lao Xả Phình Commune, and Sín Chải Commune are rearranged to form a new commune named Sín Chải Commune.
