= Điện Biên Phủ Victory Museum =

- Bảo tàng Chiến thắng Điện Biên Phủ
- Established: 5 May 2014
- Location: Điện Biên Phủ, Điện Biên province
- Type: History museum
- Collection size: over 7,000
- Director: Vũ Thị Tuyết Nga
- Website: btctdbp.svhttdl.dienbien.gov.vn

The Điện Biên Phủ Victory Museum (Vietnamese: Bảo tàng Chiến thắng Điện Biên Phủ) is a museum located in Điện Biên Phủ, Điện Biên Province, Vietnam. It is dedicated to preserving and exhibiting artifacts, documents, and historical materials related to the Dien Bien Phu Campaign and the victory in 1954, which marked a significant turning point in the First Indochina War. The museum serves as an educational and commemorative site, attracting visitors interested in Vietnam's military history.

== History ==
The museum was constructed on the site of an older museum established in 1984 to commemorate the 30th anniversary of the Dien Bien Phu Victory. Construction of the current building began in October 2012 and was completed in time for its inauguration on May 5, 2014, ahead of the 60th anniversary of the battle. On March 1, 2025, the museum's name was officially changed from "Bảo tàng Chiến thắng lịch sử Điện Biên Phủ" to "Bảo tàng Chiến thắng Điện Biên Phủ" under the management of the Department of Culture, Sports and Tourism of Điện Biên Province. The museum has hosted various exhibitions and events, including collaborations with international institutions such as the Caen Memorial Museum in France. It plays a key role in educating the public about the historical significance of the battle and has seen increased visitor numbers during anniversaries.

== Architecture ==
The museum building is designed in the shape of a truncated cone, symbolizing the conical hat worn by Vietnamese soldiers during the war, covered with a camouflage net pattern. The structure spans over 22,000 square meters, with more than 7,000 square meters dedicated to exhibition space.

== Exhibits ==
The museum houses over 7,000 artifacts, documents, and photographs related to the Dien Bien Phu Campaign. Exhibits include weapons, military equipment, personal items from soldiers, and historical records that illustrate the events of the 1954 battle. The displays are organized chronologically and thematically, covering topics such as the preparation for the campaign, key battles, and the aftermath. A highlight of the museum is the large panorama painting depicting the Dien Bien Phu Campaign. The artwork measures 132 meters in length, 20.5 meters in height, and has a diameter of 42 meters. It provides a panoramic view of the battlefield and has been exhibited in replicas elsewhere, including Hanoi.The museum also features temporary exhibitions, such as photo displays of war correspondents and thematic shows on heroes of the armed forces.
