= Tô Hiệu, Sơn La =

Tô Hiệu Phường Tô Hiệu
- Ward
- Sơn La Prison
- Interactive map of Tô Hiệu
- Location in Vietnam
- Country: Vietnam
- Regions: Northwest
- Province: Sơn La Province
- Established: June 16, 2025

Area
  - Total: 11.92 km^{2} (4.60 sq mi)

Population (2025)
  - Total: 51,293
  - Density: 4,303/km^{2} (11,140/sq mi)
- Time zone: UTC+07:00 (Indochina Time)

Tô Hiệu is a ward (phường) of Sơn La Province, Vietnam.

== Geography ==
Tô Hiệu Ward located in central Sơn La Province, and adjacent to:

- Chiềng An Ward to the north
- Chiềng Cơi Ward to the south and west
- Chiềng Sinh Ward to the east.

== History ==
On June 16, 2025, the Standing Committee of the National Assembly of Vietnam issued Resolution No. 1681/NQ-UBTVQH15 on the arrangement of commune-level administrative units of Sơn La Province in 2025 (effective from June 16, 2025). Accordingly, the entire land area and population of Quyết Thắng, Quyết Tâm, Chiềng Lề and Tô Hiệu Wards were merged to form a new ward named Tô Hiệu Ward.
