= Tủa Thàng =

Coordinates: 21°57′N 103°26′E

- Commune and village
- Interactive map of Tủa Thàng
- Country: Vietnam
- Province: Điện Biên
- Time zone: UTC+7 (UTC+7)

Tủa Thàng is a commune (xã) and village of the Điện Biên Province, northwestern Vietnam.

The entire natural area and population of Huổi Só Commune and Tủa Thàng Commune are rearranged to form a new commune named Tủa Thàng Commune.
