= Tủa Chùa =

- Commune
- Location in Vietnam
- Coordinates: 21°58′N 103°13′E
- Country: Vietnam
- Province: Điện Biên

Area
  - Total: 14.49 km^{2} (5.59 sq mi)

Population (2019)
  - Total: 8,184
  - Density: 565/km^{2} (1,460/sq mi)
- Time zone: UTC+07:00 (Indochina Time)
- Climate: Cwa

Tủa Chùa is a commune (xã) of Điện Biên Province, northwestern Vietnam.

The entire natural area and population of Tủa Chùa Township, Mường Báng Commune, and Nà Tòng Commune are rearranged to form a new commune named Tủa Chùa Commune.
