= Na Sang =

- Commune and village
- Country: Vietnam
- Province: Điện Biên

Area
  - Total: 360.15 km^{2} (139.05 sq mi)

Population (2025)
  - Total: 19,598
  - Density: 54.416/km^{2} (140.94/sq mi)
- Time zone: UTC+07:00 (Indochina Time)

Na Sang is a commune (xã) and village of the Điện Biên Province, northwestern Vietnam.

The Standing Committee of the National Assembly promulgated Resolution No. 1661/NQ-UBTVQH15 on the reorganization of commune-level administrative units of Điện Biên Province in 2025 (effective from June 16, 2025). Accordingly, the entire natural area and population of Mường Chà Township and the communes of Ma Thì Hồ, Sa Lông, and Na Sang are rearranged to form a new commune named Na Sang Commune.
