= Pa Ham =

Coordinates: 21°55′N 103°14′E

- Commune and village
- Interactive map of Pa Ham
- Country: Vietnam
- Province: Điện Biên
- Time zone: UTC+07:00 (Indochina Time)

Pa Ham is a commune (xã) and village of Điện Biên Province, northwestern Vietnam.

The Standing Committee of the National Assembly promulgated Resolution No. 1661/NQ-UBTVQH15 on the rearrangement of commune-level administrative units of Điện Biên Province in 2025 (the Resolution takes effect from 16 June 2025). Accordingly, the entire natural area and population of Hừa Ngài Commune and Pa Ham Commune are rearranged to form a new commune named Pa Ham Commune.
