= Tìa Dình =

Coordinates: 21°08′N 103°21′E

- Commune and village
- Interactive map of Tìa Dình
- Country: Vietnam
- Province: Điện Biên
- District: Điện Biên Đông

Area
  - Total: 98.82 km^{2} (38.15 sq mi)

Population
  - Total: 2,468
  - Density: 24.97/km^{2} (64.68/sq mi)
- Time zone: UTC+07:00 (Indochina Time)

Tìa Dình is a commune (xã) and village of the Điện Biên Đông District of Điện Biên Province, northwestern Vietnam. The commune covers an area of 98.82 square kilometres and has a reported population of 2468.

The entire natural area and population of Háng Lìa Commune and Tìa Dình Commune are rearranged to form a new commune named Tìa Dình Commune.
