= Nậm Kè =

Coordinates: 22°07′N 102°35′E

- Commune and village
- Interactive map of Nậm Kè
- Country: Vietnam
- Province: Điện Biên
- Time zone: UTC+07:00 (Indochina Time)

Nậm Kè is a commune (xã) and village of the Điện Biên Province, northwestern Vietnam.

The Standing Committee of the National Assembly promulgated Resolution No. 1661/NQ-UBTVQH15 on the reorganization of commune-level administrative units of Điện Biên Province in 2025 (the resolution takes effect from June 16, 2025). Accordingly, the entire natural area and population of Pá Mỳ Commune and Nậm Kè Commune are reorganized to form a new commune named Nậm Kè Commune.
