= Mường Nhé =

- Commune
- Location in Vietnam
- Coordinates: 22°11′56″N 102°26′53″E
- Country: Vietnam
- Province: Điện Biên
- Time zone: UTC+07:00 (Indochina Time)

Mường Nhé is a rural commune (xã) of Điện Biên Province, northwestern Vietnam. The commune is the capital of Mường Nhé District.

The Standing Committee of the National Assembly promulgated Resolution No. 1661/NQ-UBTVQH15 on the rearrangement of commune-level administrative units of Điện Biên Province in 2025 (the Resolution takes effect from 16 June 2025). Accordingly, the entire natural area and population of Nậm Vì Commune, Chung Chải Commune, and Mường Nhé Commune are rearranged to form a new commune named Mường Nhé Commune.
