= Chiềng Sinh, Sơn La =

Ward in Sơn La province, Vietnam

Chiềng Sinh Phường Chiềng Sinh
- Ward
- Interactive map of Chiềng Sinh
- Location in Vietnam
- Country: Vietnam
- Regions: Northwest
- Province: Sơn La Province
- Established: June 16, 2025

Area
  - Total: 68.40 km^{2} (26.41 sq mi)

Population (2025)
  - Total: 27,099
  - Density: 396.2/km^{2} (1,026/sq mi)
- Time zone: UTC+07:00 (Indochina Time)

Chiềng Sinh is a ward (phường) of Sơn La Province, Vietnam.

== Geography ==
Chiềng Sinh Ward located in central Sơn La Province, and adjacent to:

- Chiềng An Ward and Mường Bú Commune to the north
- Chiềng Mung Commune to the south and east
- Tô Hiệu Ward, Chiềng Cơi Ward and Chiềng Mai Commune to the west.

== History ==
On June 16, 2025, the Standing Committee of the National Assembly of Vietnam issued Resolution No. 1681/NQ-UBTVQH15 on the arrangement of commune-level administrative units of Sơn La Province in 2025 (effective from June 16, 2025). Accordingly, the entire land area and population of Chiềng Sinh Ward and Chiềng Ngần Commune were merged to form a new ward named Chiềng Sinh Ward.
