= Sính Phình =

Coordinates: 21.9142°N 103.3525°E

- Commune and village
- Interactive map of Sính Phình
- Country: Vietnam
- Province: Điện Biên
- Time zone: UTC+7 (UTC+7)

Sính Phình is a commune (xã) and village of the Điện Biên Province, northwestern Vietnam.

The entire natural area and population of Trung Thu Commune, Tả Phìn Commune, and Sính Phình Commune are reorganized to form a new administrative unit named Sính Phình Commune.
