= Sín Thầu =

- Commune and village
- Interactive map of Sín Thầu
- Country: Vietnam
- Province: Điện Biên
- Time zone: UTC+07:00 (Indochina Time)

Sín Thầu is a commune (xã) and village of the Điện Biên Province, northwestern Vietnam.

The entire natural area and population of Sen Thượng Commune, Leng Su Sìn Commune, and Sín Thầu Commune are rearranged to form a new commune named Sín Thầu Commune.
