= Phình Giàng =

Coordinates: 21.1267°N 103.2125°E

- Commune and village
- Interactive map of Phình Giàng
- Country: Vietnam
- Province: Điện Biên

Area
  - Total: 104.2 km^{2} (40.2 sq mi)

Population
  - Total: 2,940
- Time zone: UTC+07:00 (Indochina Time)

Phình Giàng is a commune (xã) and village of the Điện Biên Province, northwestern Vietnam. The commune covers an area of 104.2 square kilometres and has a reported population of 2940.

The Standing Committee of the National Assembly issued Resolution No. 1661/NQ-UBTVQH15 on the reorganization of commune-level administrative units of Điện Biên Province in 2025 (effective from June 16, 2025). Accordingly, the entire natural area and population of Pú Hồng Commune and Phình Giàng Commune are reorganized to form a new administrative unit named Phình Giàng Commune.
