= Mường Chà =

- Commune
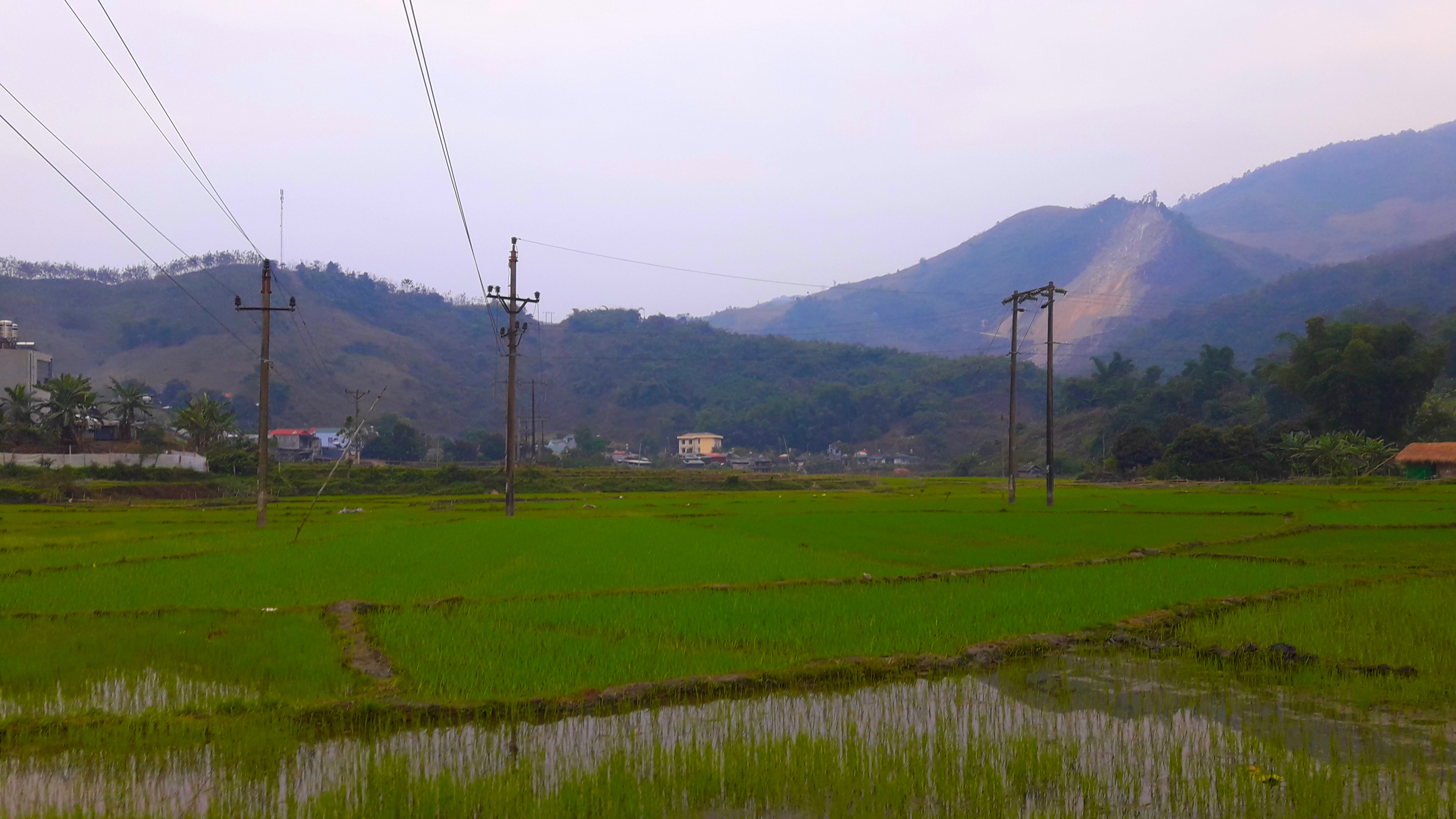
- Rice fields in Muong Cha

- Location in Vietnam
- Coordinates: 21°43′40″N 103°4′49″E
- Country: Vietnam
- Province: Điện Biên
- Established: 1997

Area
  - Total: 462.28 km^{2} (178.49 sq mi)

Population (2025)
  - Total: 13,884
  - Density: 30.034/km^{2} (77.787/sq mi)
- Time zone: UTC+07:00 (Indochina Time)
- Website: muongcha.dienbien.gov.vn

Mường Chà is a commune (xã) of Điện Biên Province, northwestern Vietnam. Mường is equivalent to Mueang.

The Standing Committee of the National Assembly promulgated Resolution No. 1661/NQ-UBTVQH15 on the rearrangement of commune-level administrative units of Điện Biên Province in 2025 (the Resolution takes effect from 16 June 2025). Accordingly, the entire natural area and population of Chà Cang Commune, Chà Nưa Commune, Nậm Tin Commune, and Pa Tần Commune are rearranged to form a new commune named Mường Chà Commune.
