= Xa Dung =

Coordinates: 21.3800°N 103.3183°E

- Commune and village
- Interactive map of Xa Dung
- Country: Vietnam
- Province: Điện Biên

Area
  - Total: 89.48 km^{2} (34.55 sq mi)

Population
  - Total: 4,915
  - Density: 0.55/km^{2} (1.4/sq mi)
- Time zone: UTC+07:00 (Indochina Time)

Xa Dung is a commune (xã) and village of the Điện Biên Province, northwestern Vietnam. The commune covers an area of 89.48 square kilometres and has a reported population of 4915.

The entire natural area and population of Phì Nhừ Commune and Xa Dung Commune are reorganized to form a new commune named Xa Dung Commune.
