= Sáng Nhè =

Coordinates: 21.8775°N 103.4222°E

- Commune and village
- Interactive map of Sáng Nhè
- Country: Vietnam
- Province: Điện Biên

Area
  - Total: 186.87 km^{2} (72.15 sq mi)

Population (2024)
  - Total: 19,208
  - Density: 102.79/km^{2} (266.22/sq mi)
- Time zone: UTC+7 (UTC+7)
- Website: sangnhe.dienbien.gov.vn

Sáng Nhè is a commune (xã) and village of Điện Biên Province, northwestern Vietnam.

The entire natural area and population of Xá Nhè Commune, Mường Đun Commune, and Phình Sáng Commune are rearranged to form a new commune named Sáng Nhè Commune.
