= Chiềng Sinh, Điện Biên =

Coordinates: 21.5303°N 103.3725°E

Chiềng Sinh
- Commune and village
- Interactive map of Chiềng Sinh
- Country: Vietnam
- Province: Điện Biên
- Time zone: UTC+7 (UTC+7)

Chiềng Sinh is a commune (xã) and village of the Điện Biên Province, northwestern Vietnam.

The Standing Committee of the National Assembly promulgated Resolution No. 1661/NQ-UBTVQH15 on the rearrangement of commune-level administrative units of Điện Biên Province in 2025 (the Resolution takes effect from 16 June 2025). Accordingly, the entire natural area and population of Nà Sáy Commune, Mường Thín Commune, Mường Khong Commune, and Chiềng Sinh Commune are rearranged to form a new commune named Chiềng Sinh Commune.
