= Si Pa Phìn =

Coordinates: 21.7772°N 102.9478°E

- Commune and village
- Interactive map of Si Pa Phìn
- Country: Vietnam
- Province: Điện Biên
- Time zone: UTC+07:00 (Indochina Time)

Si Pa Phìn is a commune (xã) and village of the Điện Biên Province in northwestern Vietnam.

The entire natural area and population of Phìn Hồ Commune and Si Pa Phìn Commune are reorganized to form a new administrative unit named Si Pa Phìn Commune.
