= Pú Nhung =

Coordinates: 21.7011°N 103.4583°E

- Commune and village
- Interactive map of Pú Nhung
- Country: Vietnam
- Province: Điện Biên
- Time zone: UTC+7 (UTC+7)

Pú Nhung is a commune (xã) and village of the Điện Biên Province, northwestern Vietnam.

The Standing Committee of the National Assembly issued Resolution No. 1661/NQ-UBTVQH15 on the reorganization of commune-level administrative units of Điện Biên Province in 2025 (effective from June 16, 2025). Accordingly, the entire natural area and population of Rạng Đông Commune, Ta Ma Commune, and Pú Nhung Commune are reorganized to form a new administrative unit named Pú Nhung Commune.
