= Na Son =

- Commune and village
- Location in Vietnam
- Coordinates: 21°17′5″N 103°12′0″E
- Country: Vietnam
- Province: Điện Biên

Area
  - Total: 73.59 km^{2} (28.41 sq mi)

Population
  - Total: 2,954
- Time zone: UTC+07:00 (Indochina Time)
- Climate: Cwa

Na Son is a commune (xã) and village of the Điện Biên Province, northwestern Vietnam. The village is known as Ban Na Son. It is located just to the southwest of Điện Biên Đông town and just northeast of Keo Lôm. The commune covers an area of 73.59 square kilometres and has a reported population of 2954.

The Standing Committee of the National Assembly promulgated Resolution No. 1661/NQ-UBTVQH15 on the rearrangement of commune-level administrative units of Điện Biên Province in 2025 (the Resolution takes effect from 16 June 2025). Accordingly, the entire natural area and population of Điện Biên Đông Township, Keo Lôm Commune, and Na Son Commune are rearranged to form a new commune named Na Son Commune.
