= Điện Biên province =

Province of Vietnam

Điện Biên
- Province
- Tỉnh Điện Biên 省奠边
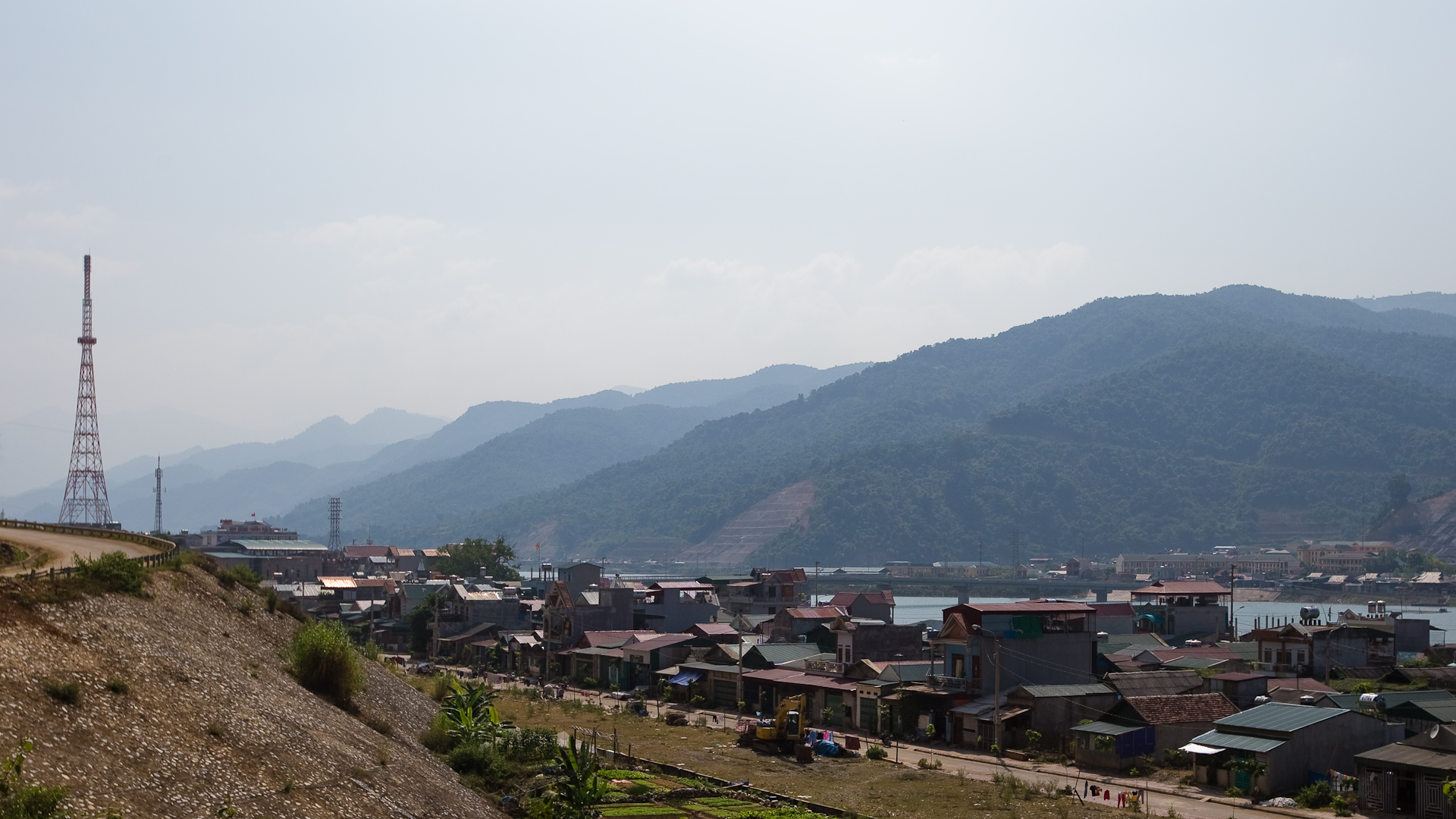
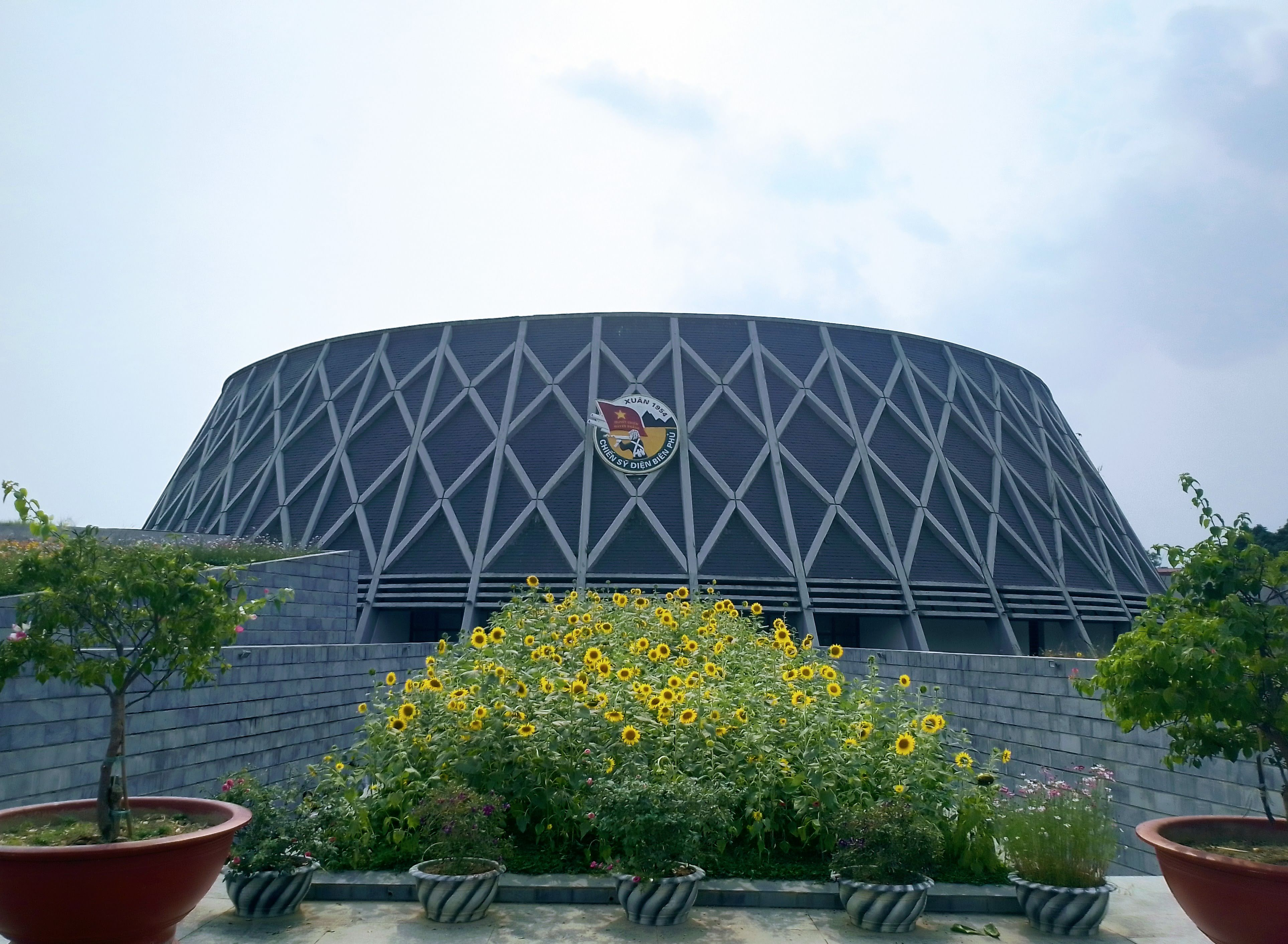
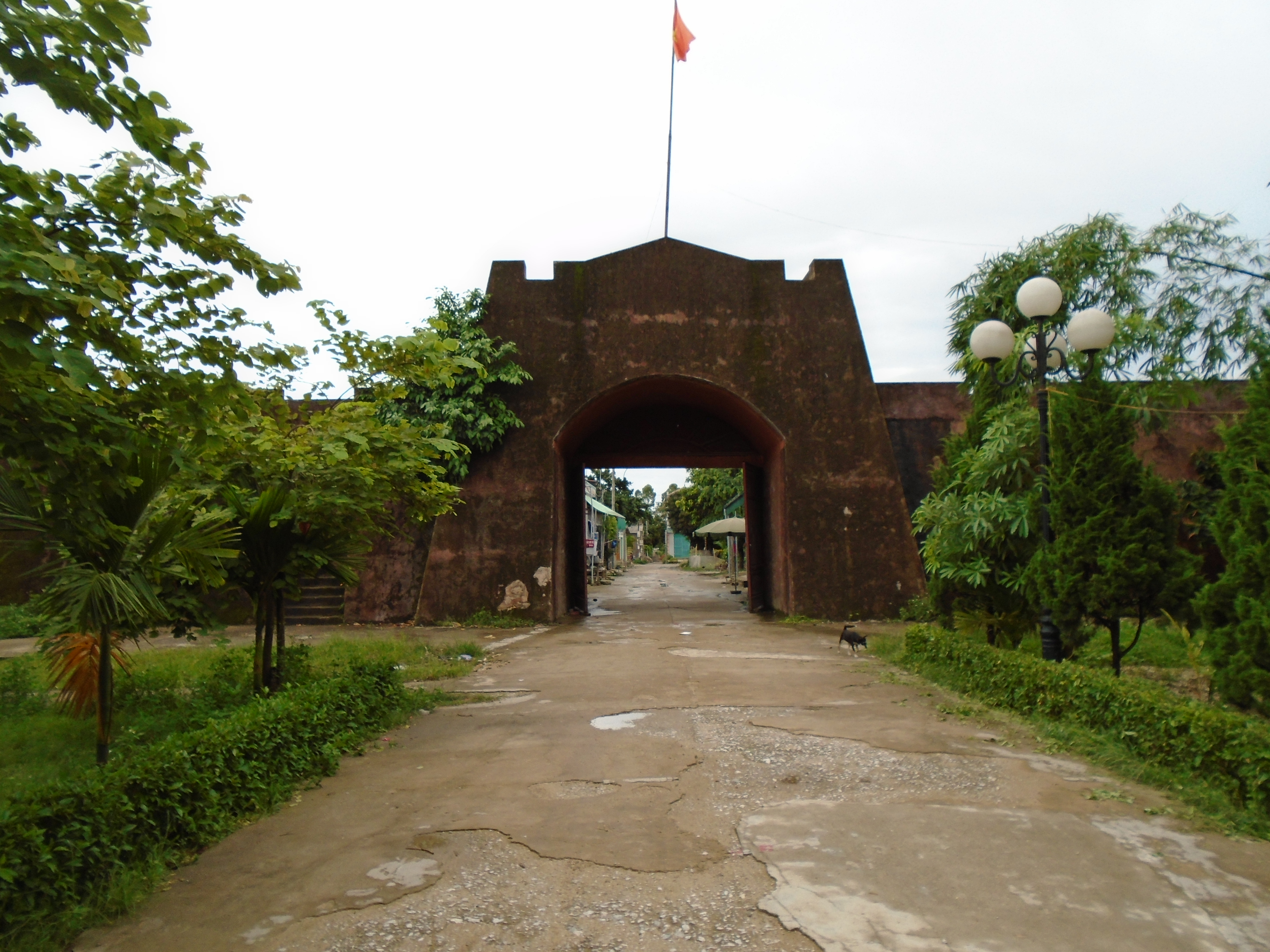
- Clockwise from top: Skyline of Muong Lay Ward; Ban Phu Citadel; Dien Bien Phu Museum

- Seal

- Location of Điên Biên within Vietnam
- Interactive map of Điện Biên
- Coordinates: 21°23′N 103°1′E
- Country: Vietnam
- Region: Northwest

Government
  - Type: Province
  - Body: Điện Biên Provincial People's Council
  - Chairman of People's Council: Lò Văn Sơn
  - Chairman of People's Committee: Lê Thành Đô

Area
  - Total: 9,539.93 km^{2} (3,683.39 sq mi)

Population (2025)
  - Total: 767,417
  - Density: 80.4426/km^{2} (208.345/sq mi)

Ethnic groups
  - Mông: 38.12%
  - Thái: 35.69%
  - Vietnamese: 17.38%
  - Khơ Mú: 3.30%
  - Dao: 1.11%
  - Others: 4.4%

GDP
  - Province: VND 15.750 trillion US$ 0.684 billion
- Time zone: UTC+7 (ICT)
- Area codes: 215
- ISO 3166 code: VN-71
- HDI (2020): ▲0.618 (29th)
- Website: www.dienbien.gov.vn

Điện Biên is a province in the Northwest region of Vietnam. It is bordered by Lai Châu to the northeast, Sơn La to the southeast, Pu'er City, Yunnan, China, to the northwest, and Phongsaly province in Laos to the west. The province covers an area of about 9,540 km^{2} (3,683 mi^{2}) and as of 2024 had a population of 656,700 people.

== Places ==
Thẳm Khến Cave (also known locally as Chùa Ta Cave): Located at an altitude of nearly 1,000m above sea level, in a limestone mountain range with a geological tectonic process of millions of years, Tham Khen cave in Muong Dun commune, Tua Chua district has also been recognized by the Ministry of Culture. Sports and Tourism ranked national relics and scenic spots according to decision No. 3086/QD-BVHTTDL dated October 27, 2020. Chua Ta cave also has two typical types of ecosystems: Limestone mountain ecosystem and cave ecosystem. This place converges the diverse properties of nature.

== Climate ==
Điện Biên province has a humid subtropical climate (Köppen Cwa).

Climate data for Điện Biên Phủ, elevation 479 m (1,572 ft)
Month	Jan	Feb	Mar	Apr	May	Jun	Jul	Aug	Sep	Oct	Nov	Dec	Year
Record high °C (°F)	32.4 (90.3)	35.0 (95.0)	36.1 (97.0)	38.5 (101.3)	38.6 (101.5)	37.9 (100.2)	36.0 (96.8)	36.0 (96.8)	35.0 (95.0)	35.5 (95.9)	34.0 (93.2)	31.1 (88.0)	38.6 (101.5)
Mean daily maximum °C (°F)	23.8 (74.8)	26.2 (79.2)	29.0 (84.2)	31.0 (87.8)	31.7 (89.1)	31.1 (88.0)	30.4 (86.7)	30.4 (86.7)	30.5 (86.9)	29.2 (84.6)	26.7 (80.1)	23.9 (75.0)	28.6 (83.5)
Daily mean °C (°F)	16.5 (61.7)	18.3 (64.9)	21.0 (69.8)	23.8 (74.8)	25.5 (77.9)	26.3 (79.3)	25.9 (78.6)	25.6 (78.1)	24.9 (76.8)	22.9 (73.2)	19.7 (67.5)	16.5 (61.7)	22.2 (72.0)
Mean daily minimum °C (°F)	12.5 (54.5)	13.5 (56.3)	15.8 (60.4)	19.3 (66.7)	21.7 (71.1)	23.4 (74.1)	23.3 (73.9)	23.0 (73.4)	21.7 (71.1)	19.4 (66.9)	15.7 (60.3)	12.4 (54.3)	18.5 (65.3)
Record low °C (°F)	−1.3 (29.7)	4.8 (40.6)	5.3 (41.5)	11.6 (52.9)	14.8 (58.6)	17.4 (63.3)	18.7 (65.7)	10.7 (51.3)	14.2 (57.6)	7.7 (45.9)	4.0 (39.2)	0.4 (32.7)	−1.3 (29.7)
Average precipitation mm (inches)	26.0 (1.02)	30.3 (1.19)	64.1 (2.52)	133.8 (5.27)	222.9 (8.78)	305.3 (12.02)	359.6 (14.16)	324.8 (12.79)	168.6 (6.64)	71.7 (2.82)	44.1 (1.74)	26.0 (1.02)	1,784.3 (70.25)
Average rainy days	5.7	5.4	7.5	13.7	17.9	22.0	24.4	22.3	15.6	10.1	6.8	4.6	155.9
Average relative humidity (%)	82.4	80.2	80.2	81.7	82.2	83.9	86.4	87.5	86.3	84.2	83.1	83.1	83.4
Mean monthly sunshine hours	159.8	177.3	198.4	202.0	202.3	141.3	132.7	148.6	168.4	170.5	160.5	160.0	2,025.4
Source: Vietnam Institute for Building Science and Technology

Climate data for Pha Din, elevation 1,347 m (4,419 ft)
Month	Jan	Feb	Mar	Apr	May	Jun	Jul	Aug	Sep	Oct	Nov	Dec	Year
Record high °C (°F)	29.3 (84.7)	31.8 (89.2)	36.0 (96.8)	36.5 (97.7)	36.6 (97.9)	35.5 (95.9)	36.0 (96.8)	33.8 (92.8)	32.6 (90.7)	31.4 (88.5)	31.2 (88.2)	29.1 (84.4)	36.6 (97.9)
Mean daily maximum °C (°F)	17.2 (63.0)	19.6 (67.3)	22.7 (72.9)	25.0 (77.0)	25.2 (77.4)	24.6 (76.3)	24.2 (75.6)	24.5 (76.1)	24.2 (75.6)	22.4 (72.3)	19.7 (67.5)	17.1 (62.8)	22.2 (72.0)
Daily mean °C (°F)	12.5 (54.5)	14.5 (58.1)	17.7 (63.9)	20.0 (68.0)	20.7 (69.3)	20.8 (69.4)	20.6 (69.1)	20.6 (69.1)	20.0 (68.0)	18.1 (64.6)	15.2 (59.4)	12.4 (54.3)	17.7 (63.9)
Mean daily minimum °C (°F)	9.8 (49.6)	11.3 (52.3)	14.3 (57.7)	16.6 (61.9)	17.9 (64.2)	18.7 (65.7)	18.7 (65.7)	18.6 (65.5)	17.7 (63.9)	15.8 (60.4)	12.7 (54.9)	10.0 (50.0)	15.2 (59.4)
Record low °C (°F)	−0.4 (31.3)	0.1 (32.2)	−0.1 (31.8)	5.9 (42.6)	11.0 (51.8)	13.1 (55.6)	14.0 (57.2)	15.0 (59.0)	10.9 (51.6)	8.3 (46.9)	4.2 (39.6)	−1.2 (29.8)	−1.2 (29.8)
Average rainfall mm (inches)	26.0 (1.02)	30.3 (1.19)	64.1 (2.52)	133.8 (5.27)	222.9 (8.78)	305.3 (12.02)	359.6 (14.16)	324.8 (12.79)	168.6 (6.64)	71.7 (2.82)	44.1 (1.74)	26.0 (1.02)	1,784.3 (70.25)
Average rainy days	5.7	5.4	7.5	13.7	17.9	22.0	24.4	22.3	15.6	10.1	6.8	4.6	155.9
Average relative humidity (%)	81.4	75.8	71.1	75.5	83.0	89.7	91.4	90.5	86.9	86.0	83.9	81.9	83.2
Mean monthly sunshine hours	179.7	172.6	205.9	213.4	192.5	119.7	125.6	140.5	162.4	164.9	162.7	180.9	2,019.9
Source: Vietnam Institute for Building Science and Technology

== Tourism ==
Điện Biên has cultural and historical attractions. Sites include the Điện Biên Phủ Campaign headquarters in Mường Phăng, French strongholds like Him Lam and Độc Lập, Mường Phăng, A1 hill, C1, E1, and the De Castries bunker. Bản Phủ Citadel and the temple of Hoàng Công Chất are also visited.

Monuments include the Điện Biên Phủ Victory Monument (inaugurated in 2004) and the Victory Museum (opened in 2014). The province also offers natural attractions like Mường Thanh Valley, Pha Đin Pass, Mường Nhé primeval forest, caves (Pa Thơm, Thẩm Púa), hot springs (Hua Pe, U Va), and lakes (Pá Khoang, Pe Luông). In the first half of 2018, Điện Biên welcomed around 490,000 tourists, including 94,000 international visitors, generating nearly 644 billion VND in revenue.
