= Mê Linh =

Commune in Hanoi, Vietnam

- Commune
- Trình Hai Bà Trưng Temple in Mê Linh Commune
- Interactive map of Mê Linh
- Coordinates: 21.147201393076198°N 105.74210339999995°E
- Country: Vietnam
- Region: Red River Delta
- Municipality: Hanoi
- Administrative headquarters: Tráng Việt Hamlet

Area
  - Total: 24.07 km^{2} (9.29 sq mi)

Population (2025)
  - Total: 69,107
  - Density: 2,872/km^{2} (7,440/sq mi)
- Website: melinh.hanoi.gov.vn

Mê Linh is a commune in the municipality of Hanoi, Vietnam.

On 16 June 2025, district-level administrative units nationwide ceased to operate.

On the same date, the Standing Committee of the National Assembly of Vietnam issued Resolution No. 1656/NQ-UBTVQH15 on the arrangement of commune-level administrative units in Hanoi in 2025. Under the resolution, the entire area and population of Tráng Việt Commune, parts of Tiền Phong, Văn Khê, and Mê Linh communes, part of the area of Đại Thịnh Commune, and the remaining areas of Hồng Hà, Liên Hà, Liên Hồng, and Liên Trung communes, as well as the remaining area of Đại Mạch Commune, were merged to form a new commune named Mê Linh. The former communes were located in Mê Linh district, Đan Phượng district, and Đông Anh district, respectively.
