= Mê Linh (disambiguation) =

Mê Linh may refer to several places in Vietnam, including:

- Mê Linh, a commune of Hanoi
- Mê Linh district, a former rural district of Hanoi
- Mê Linh Square, an urban square in downtown Ho Chi Minh City
