= Vietnam National University of Agriculture =

University

- Học viện Nông nghiệp Việt Nam
- Motto: Nông nghiệp - Nông dân - Nông thôn
- Motto in English: Agriculture - farmers - rural
- Type: Public
- Established: October 12, 1956
- President: Nguyen Thi Lan
- Academic staff: 700
- Administrative staff: 1300
- Students: 23000
- Undergraduates: 21690
- Postgraduates: 1310
- Location: Gia lâm, Hanoi, Vietnam; 21°00′17″N 105°56′19″E
- Colors: Green and orange
- Website: www.vnua.edu.vn/eng/

- Location within Vietnam

Vietnam National University of Agriculture (or VNUA) (Vietnamese: Học viện Nông nghiệp Việt Nam), until 2014 Hanoi University of Agriculture (HUA), is an education and research university specializing in the agricultural sector. The university is located in Trau Quy town, Gia Lam district, a Hanoi suburban area, about 12 km far from Hanoi city centre.

== History ==
Vietnam National University of Agriculture was established in Hanoi on October 12, 1956, first called University of Agriculture and Forestry, based in Van Dien (Hanoi). The first Rector was Prof. Bui Huy Dap, the first vice-rector was the agronomist Luong Dinh Cua. In 1959, the school moved to the present location, Trau Quy, Gia Lam, Hanoi.

The university name has changed several times:

- University of Agriculture and Forestry from 1956,
- Academy of Agriculture and Forestry in 1958,
- In 1963 the Academy of Agriculture and Forestry was split into two universities: the University of Agriculture and the University of Forestry.
- In 1967 the University of Agriculture was renamed Agricultural University,
- In 2008 its official name became Hanoi University of Agriculture (HUA) (Vietnamese: Đại học Nông nghiệp Hà Nội),
- In 2014 the university was renamed Vietnam National University of Agriculture (VNUA) (Vietnamese: Học viện Nông nghiệp Việt Nam)

== 1956 - 1966 ==
Formerly the College of Agriculture and Forestry, was established under Decree No. 53/ND-NL dated 12/10/1956 of the Ministry of Agriculture and Forestry, with three departments: Agronomy, Animal Husbandry-Veterinary Medicine, Forestry education; in the five disciplines of farming, agricultural mechanics, animal husbandry, veterinary and forestry.

In 1958, the research institute farming, livestock research institute, and the timber and forestry laboratory merged to become the Institute of Agriculture and Forestry. In 1961, branches were set up for farming and fish processing. In 1963, the academy moved the staff and technical facilities for the establishment of the Institute of Agricultural Sciences, College of Forestry. Now called University School of Agriculture.

In research, the university created three varieties: 813, 828 and VN1; and two sweet potato varieties for high yield.

== 1967 - 1975 ==
The university has established Agriculture University II, now called Hanoi Agricultural University 1. In 1968, the School of Fisheries Sciences split to form the University of Fisheries.

== 1975 - 1990 ==
After the liberation of the South, the school built Agricultural University No IV (now University of Agriculture and Forestry, Ho Chi Minh City) while sending hundreds of experienced staff, graduate engineer additional staff for the departments of the southern provinces.

In 1977, the university established a Faculty of Land Management.

The school has trained over 9800 engineers, creating four high-yielding rice varieties (T125, A3, A4, A5).

== 1991 - 2000 ==
The school has trained over 8800 engineers, to select and create 21 new plant varieties.

== 2001 - 2008 ==
The university has 13 science, 9 departments, 13 institutes and centers, with 941 staff members, including 520 faculty (61 Professors, Associate Professor, Dr. 326, Masters). The university has 29 undergraduate programs, 24 training program graduate.

The size of the university training school continued to increase, from 12,300 students in 2001 to 17,600 in 2005 (up 43%). All courses increased from 469 students in 2001 to 857 students in 2005 (up 82%).

As of 2006 the university has trained over 44,800 engineers, 1072 masters, 267 doctoral and staff colleges, intermediate and technician. Particularly from 2001 to 03/31/2006, trained over 11,900 engineers, 668 masters, 77 PhD.

Where the Party and State was awarded the Medal of Ho Chi Minh in 2001, Hero of Labor, during renovation in 2005.

== Personnel ==
Total number of teachers and school personnel is 860 people, including 549 lecturers, 01 National Awarded Teacher, 27 outstanding teachers, 84 professors and associate professors, 158 doctoral, 152 master's degree lecturers.

=== Faculties ===
1. Faculty of Agronomy
2. Faculty of Animal Science
3. Faculty of Accounting and Business Management
4. Faculty of Biotechnology
5. Faculty of Economics and Rural Development
6. Faculty of Engineering
7. Faculty of Environment
8. Faculty of Fisheries
9. Faculty of Education and Foreign Languages
10. Faculty of Food Science and Technology
11. Faculty of Information Technology
12. Faculty of Land Management
13. Faculty of Political and Social Sciences
14. Faculty of Veterinary Medicine
15. School for International Education and Development
16. Citizen Military Education

=== Institutes and centers ===
1. Institute for Graduate Education
2. Center for Agricultural Research and Ecological Studies
3. Center for Experimentation and Vocational Training
4. Information and Library Center
5. Center for Interdisciplinary Research on Rural Development
6. The Research Center for Tropical Plant Pathology
7. Training Center for Advanced Technology
8. Center for Sports and Culture
9. Foreign Language Center
10. Center for Sustainable Agriculture Research and Development
11. Center for Professional and Job Consultations
12. Center for Infrastructure and Campus Services
13. Institute of Agro-Biology
14. Rice Research Institute
15. Center for Agricultural Consultations and Services
16. Center for Printing and Publications
17. Clinic and Kidergarden

== Research ==
=== Faculty of Accounting and Business Management ===
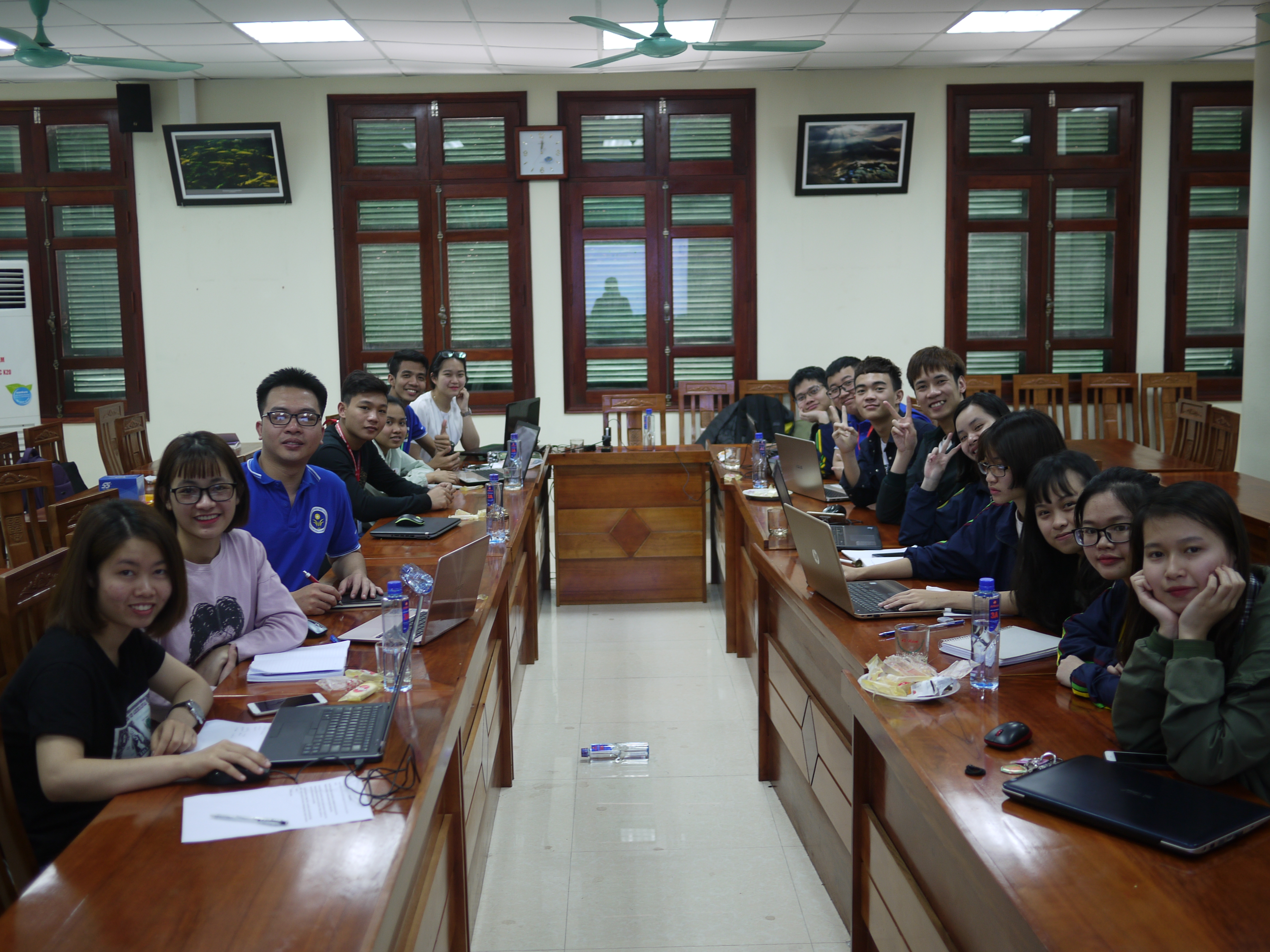
1. Participants at Wikipedia workshop at Vietnam National University of Agriculture, Hanoi in March 2018.
  Accounting;
2. Business Administration;
3. Agribusiness;
4. Agriculture Business Administration advanced.

=== Faculty of Agronomy ===
Department of Agronomy is one of three faculties that were first established at the Hanoi University of Agriculture. Faculty of Agronomy, Crop Science, previously known as, was established in 1956. Sciences in 1997 to officially rename the current Agronomy. Currently, the department has 95 staff, including Professor 6.

- Undergraduate programmes, Bachelor's degree:
1. Crops;
2. Seed selection and plant breeding;
3. Plant Protection;
4. Horticultural science;
5. Mulberry and raising honey bees;
6. Fruits and vegetables and landscape.
- Graduate programmes, Master's degree:
1. Cultivation techniques;
2. Seed selection and breeding plants;
3. Protect plants.

=== Faculty of Animal Science ===
- Undergraduate programs
1. Animal science
2. Animal nutrition and feed technology
3. Animal production and health
4. Aquaculture
5. Aquatic animal pathology
- Master programs
1. Animal science
2. Aquaculture
- Doctoral programs
1. Animal science
2. Animal genetics and breeding
3. Animal nutrition

=== Faculty of Environment ===
- Undergraduate programs
1. Environmental engineering;
2. Environmental management;
3. Ecology and natural resources management.
- Master program
1. Environmental sciences.

=== Faculty of Land Management ===
- Undergraduate programs
1. Soil science
2. Agro-chemistry
3. Land management
- Master programs
1. Soil science
2. Land management
- Doctoral programs
1. Soil science
2. Land management

=== Faculty of Veterinary Medicine ===
  - Undergraduate programmes, Bachelor's degree

Veterinarian

- Graduate programmes, Doctor/PhD degree

=== Faculty of Economics and Rural Development ===
1. Economics
2. Economy Agriculture
3. Extension

=== Faculty of Engineering ===
- Undergraduate programmes, Bachelor's degree:
1. Agricultural Engineering
2. Mechanical force
3. mechanical engineering
4. Preservation and processing Mechanical
5. supply and use
6. Automation
7. Rural Works (Works)
8. Rural industries (public areas)
- Graduate programmes, Master's degree
1. Technical plant and equipment mechanization Agro-forestry
2. Automobile Engineering tractors
3. Electrification of agriculture and rural
- Graduate programmes, Doctor/PhD degree:

Machines and technical equipment of agricultural mechanization and rural

=== Faculty of Biotechnology ===
Faculty of Biotechnology was established October 23, 2008

- Biotechnology Engineering

=== Faculty of Information Technology ===
The Faculty was established on October 10, 2005. The first intake class was TH47 in 2002. This class of TH47 graduated on May 6, 2007.

- There are 5 Departments and 1 Center in the Faculty:
1. Department of Software Engineering;
2. Department of Computer Science;
3. Department of Mathematics;
4. Department of Physics;
5. Department of Applied Mathematics - Informatics;
6. Center for Computational and Data Integration
- The Faculty has so far only one undergraduate programmes with two study fields:
1. Computer engineering
2. Information management

=== Faculty of Education and Foreign Languages ===
1. Landscapes in Hanoi Agricultural University
2. Teachers of Agricultural Engineering

=== Faculty of Faculty of Political and Social Science ===
BA Sociology (Major Rural Sociology)

== Awards and honors ==
- Independence Medal runner (1991);
- Third-class Independence Medal (1986);
- Labour Order, first class (1981);
- 3 second-class Labor Medal (1977, 1965, 1962);
- 2 third-class Labor Medal (1973, 1960);
- Medal of Freedom of the Lao PDR (1981).
- Hero of Labor (2005);
- Ho Chi Minh Medal (2001);
- First-class Independence Medal (1996);
- Labour Order, first class of the Lao PDR (2000);
- Ministry of Education and Training awards and gave excellent advanced chess school (school year 1999 to 2000, 2002–2003); 02 training Merit (1997, 1998), 06 Certificate of Merit for Scientific Research (from 2001 to 2005 );
- 20 Certificate of Merit from Ministry of Agriculture - Rural Development, Ministry of Science and Technology, the provincial People's Committee on the achievement of science and technology training and technology transfer for production;
- 30 consecutive years been recognized outstanding units advanced on the capital's sports (1975–2005).

== International cooperation in education ==
1. Advanced education program in crop science
2. Advanced education program in business administration in agriculture.
3. Program 2 + 2 joint training between Vietnam National University of Agriculture and the University of Life Sciences Van Hall Larenstein (VHL). The majors were selected by students: Plant Science, Vegetable Fruit landscape, agricultural business management.
4. Joint training program international master's degree in Economics and Rural Sociology.
5. Affiliate Program Masters Graduate sustainable farming.
6. Joint training program between Vietnam National University of Agriculture with Changjiang University.
7. Summer school short courses for international students

== See also ==
- List of universities in Vietnam
- Hanoi University of Natural Resources and Environment
