= Quang Dũng =

Vietnamese poet (1921 – 1988)

Bùi Đình Diệm (Chinese: 裴廷琰) with his pen name Quang Dũng (Chinese: 光勇, 11 October 1921 – 13 October 1988) was a Vietnamese poet and reciter. He was one of the poets associated with the Nhân Văn–Giai Phẩm movement. In his style, following Vladimir Mayakovsky, he experimented with longer poems. Quang Dũng is the author of several very famous poems such as Tây Tiến (Advancing Westward), Đôi mắt người Sơn Tây (The eyes of Sơn Tây people), Đôi bờ (The two banks). Apart from his work in literature and poetry, Quang Dũng was also an artist and musician.

== Biography ==
Quang Dũng's real name was Bùi Đình Diệm. He was born in 1921 at village Phượng Trì, Đan Phượng District. Quang Dũng finished his high school education at Thăng Long School, and after graduation he worked as a teacher in private School at Sơn Tây.

After the August Revolution of 1945, Quang Dũng joined Vietnam People's Army and became the journalist of "Chiến đấu" (Fighting) Newspaper. In 1947 he took a course at Sơn Tây's Vocational Continuation Military School. After graduating, he was appointed the commander position of 212th Battalion in Tây Tiến Regiment (Advance Westward Regiment). Later, Quang Dũng took part in the offensive campaigns of the Tây Tiến regiment at north-western Vietnam and at the border regions of Laos. During this time he was also the Deputy Chairman of Laos-Vietnam Propaganda Team. After finishing the Tây Tiến offensives, in late of 1948 Quang Dũng became the Head of Propaganda and Instruction Department in Tây Tiến Regiment, and then the Head of Letters and Arts Delegation of 3rd Inter-region. In August 1951, Quang Dũng concluded his military service. After the Resistance war ended in 1954, he was appointed to be the Editor of Văn Nghệ newspaper, then worked at Literature Publisher.

During these times Quang Dũng produced many literature works, including poems, short stories, drama screenplays. He also created many oil-paintings and wrote some music, including the famous song Ba Vì. The famous poem Tây Tiến was written when Quang Dũng participated in the Military Congress of 3rd Inter-region at Phù Lưu Chanh village (Hà Nam).

Quang Dũng took part in the Nhân Văn–Giai Phẩm movement and was severely punished by the government. Like other Nhân Văn – Giai Phẩm participators (such as Nguyễn Bính, Hồ Dzếnh,...), his work was heavily criticized in North Vietnam and his literary career was severely affected due to the Nhân Văn – Giai Phẩm affair. As a result, Quang Dũng spent the rest of his life in obscurity. However, some of his masterpieces were very popular in South Vietnam and were widely propagated.

Quang Dũng died on 13 October 1988 at the age of 67 in Thanh Nhàn Hospital, Hanoi after a long illness.

=== Rehabilitation ===
Later, following the Đổi Mới reforms of 1986, the Vietnamese government and Communist Party began to re-evaluate and rehabilitate the formerly mistreated writers and artists. As a result, Quang Dũng's honour was gradually restored. His famous poem Tây Tiến was introduced in high school literature textbooks and became popular again. In 2001, Quang Dũng was posthumously awarded the State Prize of Arts and Literature.

== See also ==
- Bùi Đình Đạm
- Phạm Duy Cẩn
- Phạm Đình Chương
