= Bùi Đình Đạm =

South Vietnamese general (1926–2009)

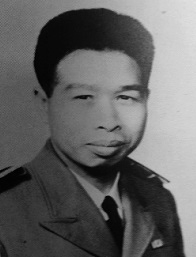
- Major General Bùi Đình Đạm in archives of the United States Army Command and General Staff College.

Chairman of the Human Resources General Department, Ministry of Defense
- In office ? November 1965 – 30 April 1974
- Deputy: Huỳnh Ngọc Lang; Nguyễn Đức Đệ
- Preceded by: Trần Văn Vân
- Succeeded by: Position abolished

Chairman of the General Administration Department of the Joint Staff
- In office February 1965 – November 1965
- Preceded by: Trần Văn Trung
- Succeeded by: Đồng Văn Khuyên

Chairman of the 4th Department for Logistics of the Joint Staff
- In office November 1963 – February 1965

Deputy Commander and Staff Chief of the 7th Infantry Division
- In office June 1962 – December 1962
- Preceded by: Huỳnh Văn Cao
- Succeeded by: Nguyễn Hữu Có

Staff Chief of the Military University
- In office August 1957 – June 1960
- Preceded by: Trần Văn Minh

Staff Chief of the Thủ Đức Reserve Officer Schools
- In office May 1954 – May 1955
- Preceded by: Phạm Văn Cảm

Personal details
- Born: 26 June 1926 Phượng Trì, Đan Phượng, Hà Đông, Tonkin
- Died: 30 May 2009 (aged 82) San Jose, California, US
- Party: Cần Lao (1955–65); Independent (since 1965)
- Other political affiliations: Military (until 1975)
- Spouse: ?
- Children: ?
- Relatives: Bùi Đình Diệm (elder brother)
- Education: Master of Social Work of the San Jose State University
- Military career
- Allegiance: State of Vietnam; Republic of Vietnam
- Service years: 1948–75
- Rank: Mayor General (Thiếu tướng)
- Nicknames: Đan Phượng; Colonel Bùi (Note: By the US officers.)
- Commands: 7th Infantry Division; Capital Special Zone
- Conflicts: First Indochina War; Vietnam War
- Other work: Lecturer; Poet

Major General Bùi Đình Đạm (Chinese: 裴廷惔, born 26 June 1926 – 30 May 2009 in Hà Đông province) was an officer of the Army of the Republic of Vietnam.

== Biography ==
Bùi Đình Đạm, saint's name Giuse, (Note: It was registered with the US Immigration and Naturalization Service as Joseph.) pen name Đan Phượng (Chinese: 丹鳳), was born on June 26, 1926, at Phượng Trì village, Đan Phượng district, Hà Đông province, Tonkin (now Đan Phượng commune, Hanoi). He has an elder brother named Bùi Đình Diệm, that is poet Quang Dũng.

== Career ==
Besides his military career, Bùi Đình Đạm was also a poet and Catholic university lecturer. His name was mentioned by political advisor Ngô Đình Nhu (figure) in the final episode of 1988 series Cards on the Table as a lifeline of the regime.

=== Military education ===
- Officers School of Vietnam, (Note: This facility has now been converted into the Thiên Trường Stadium.) Class 1 of Phan Bội Châu
- U.S. Army Command and General Staff College

=== Military service ===
As a Colonel Bùi was a key figure at the Battle of Ap Bac. He held various position in the ARVN:

- Platoon Leader, Company Leader: Co.1, Bn 3 VN (North Vietnam)
- Served in Military Equipment Bureau, 1st Military Region.
- Chief of Staff, Thu Duc Reserved Officers School
- Head of General Staff Bureau, Military Collegẹ
- Chief of Staff, 7th Infantry Division
- Deputy Commander, 7th Infantry Division
- Commander, 7th Infantry Division
- Head of G4 (logistics), Joint General Staff
- Head of General Administration, Joint General Staff
- Director of Mobilization Bureau, Defense Ministry
- Director General of Personnel Bureau, Defense Ministry

== See also ==
- Bùi Đình Diệm
