= Bắc Từ Liêm district =

Bắc Từ Liêm district Quận Bắc Từ Liêm
- Urban district
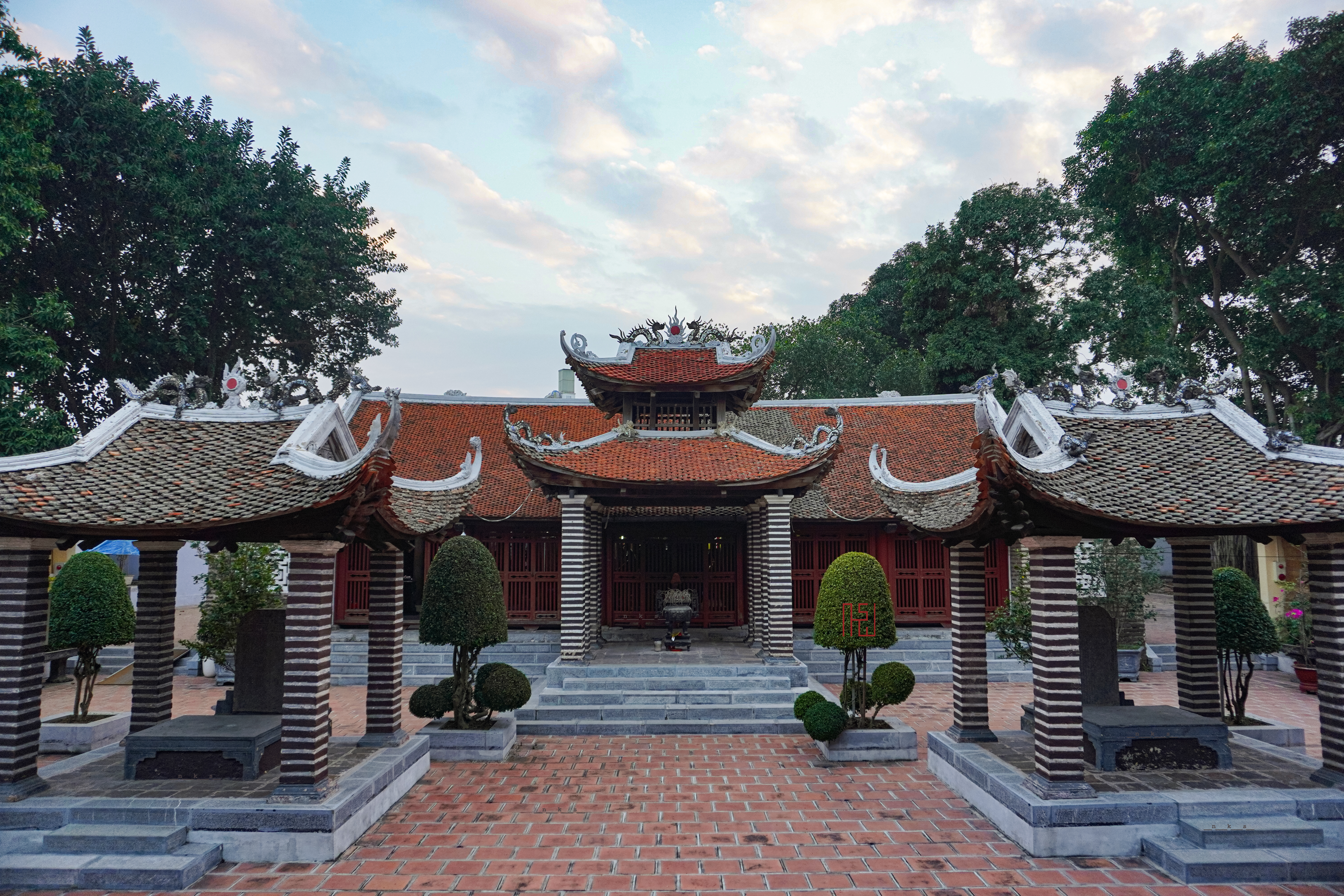
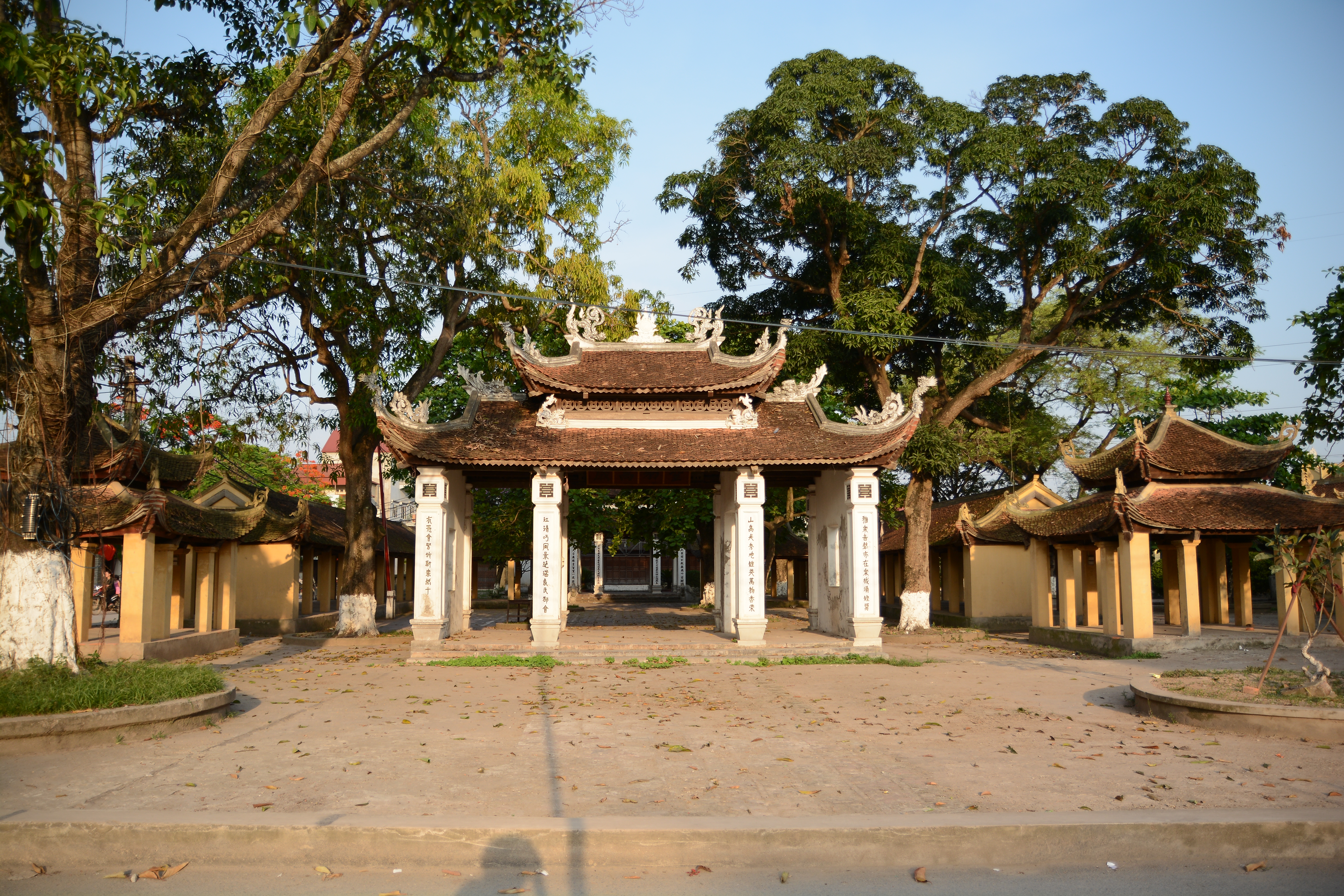
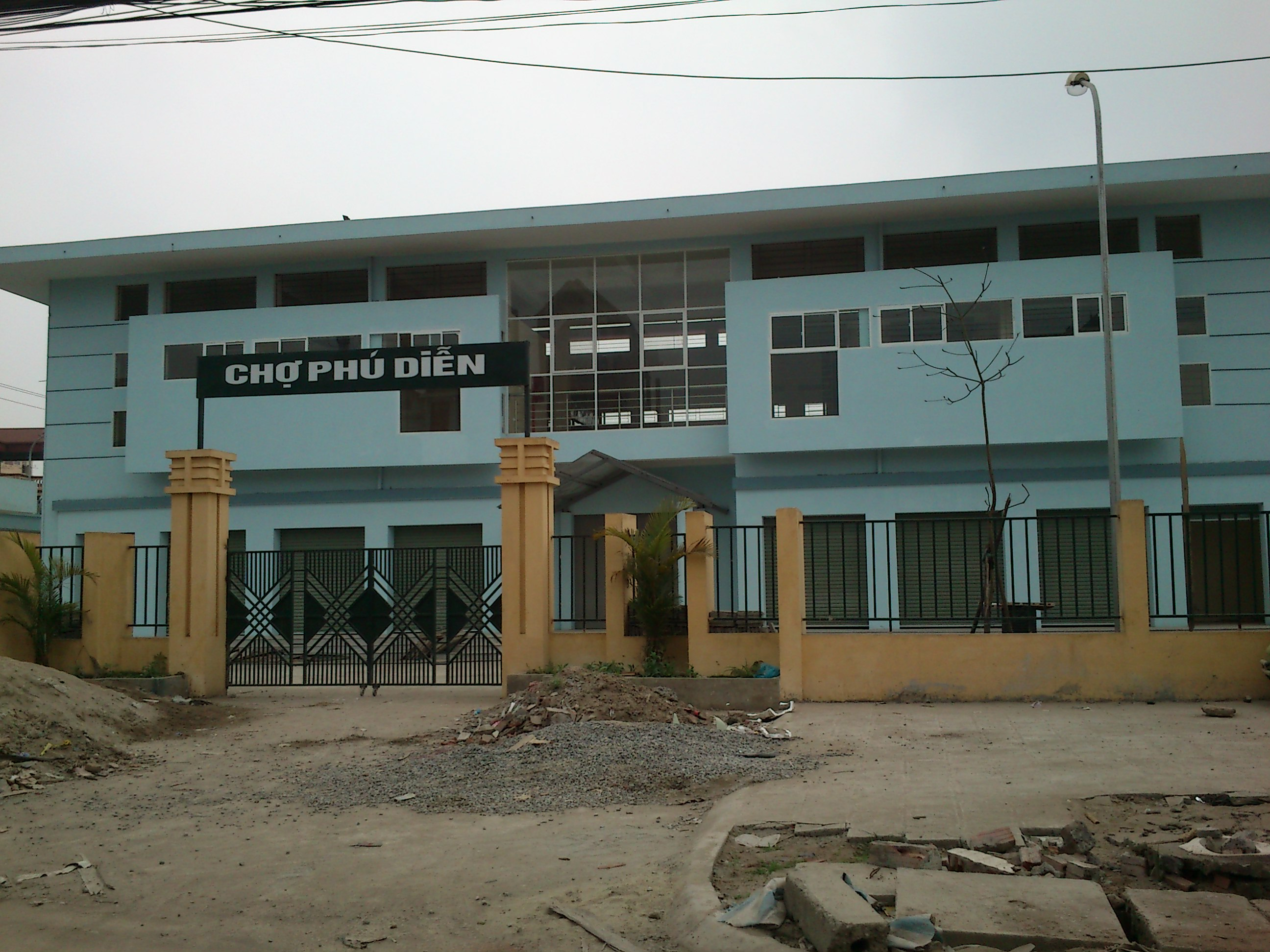
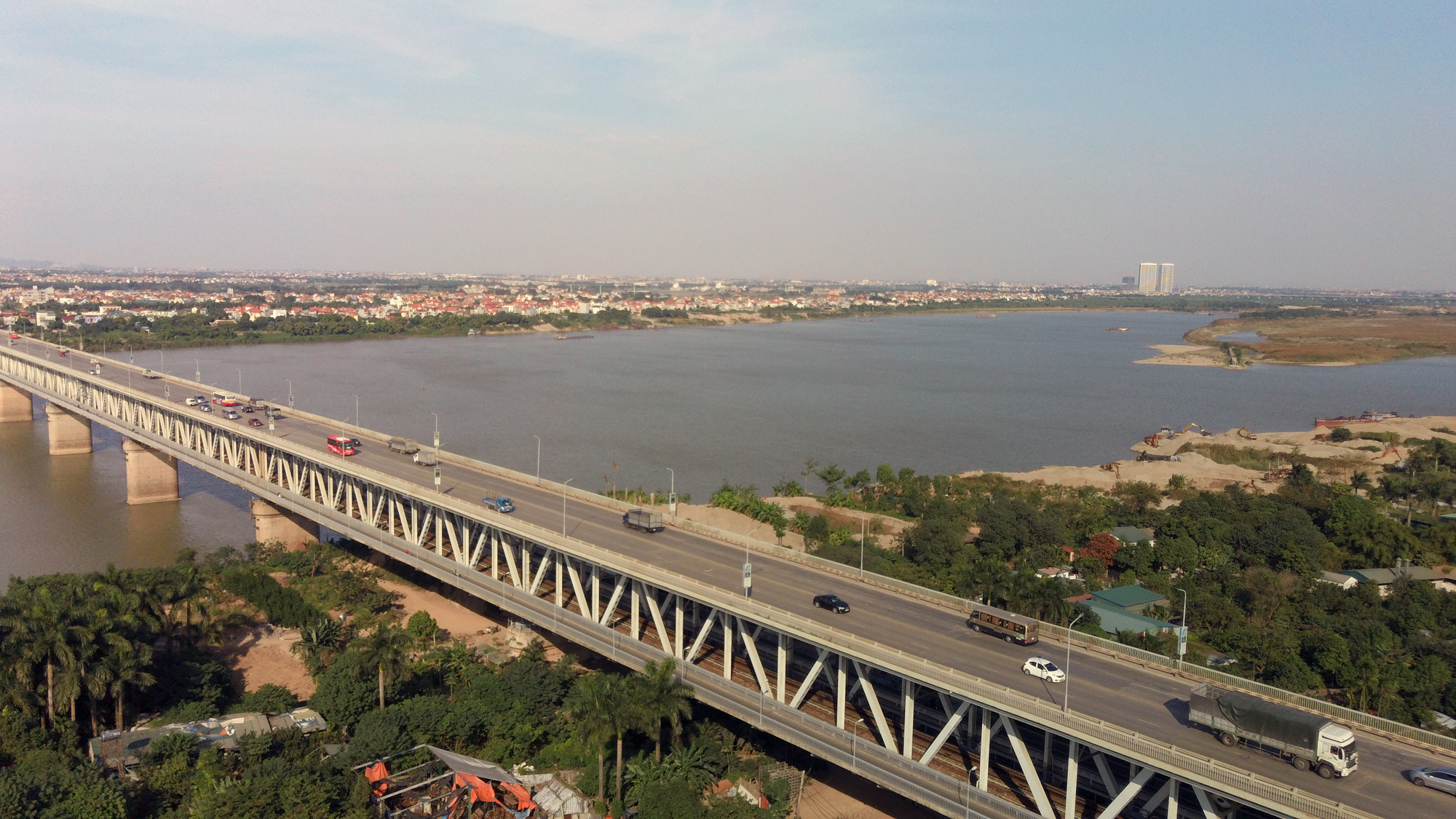
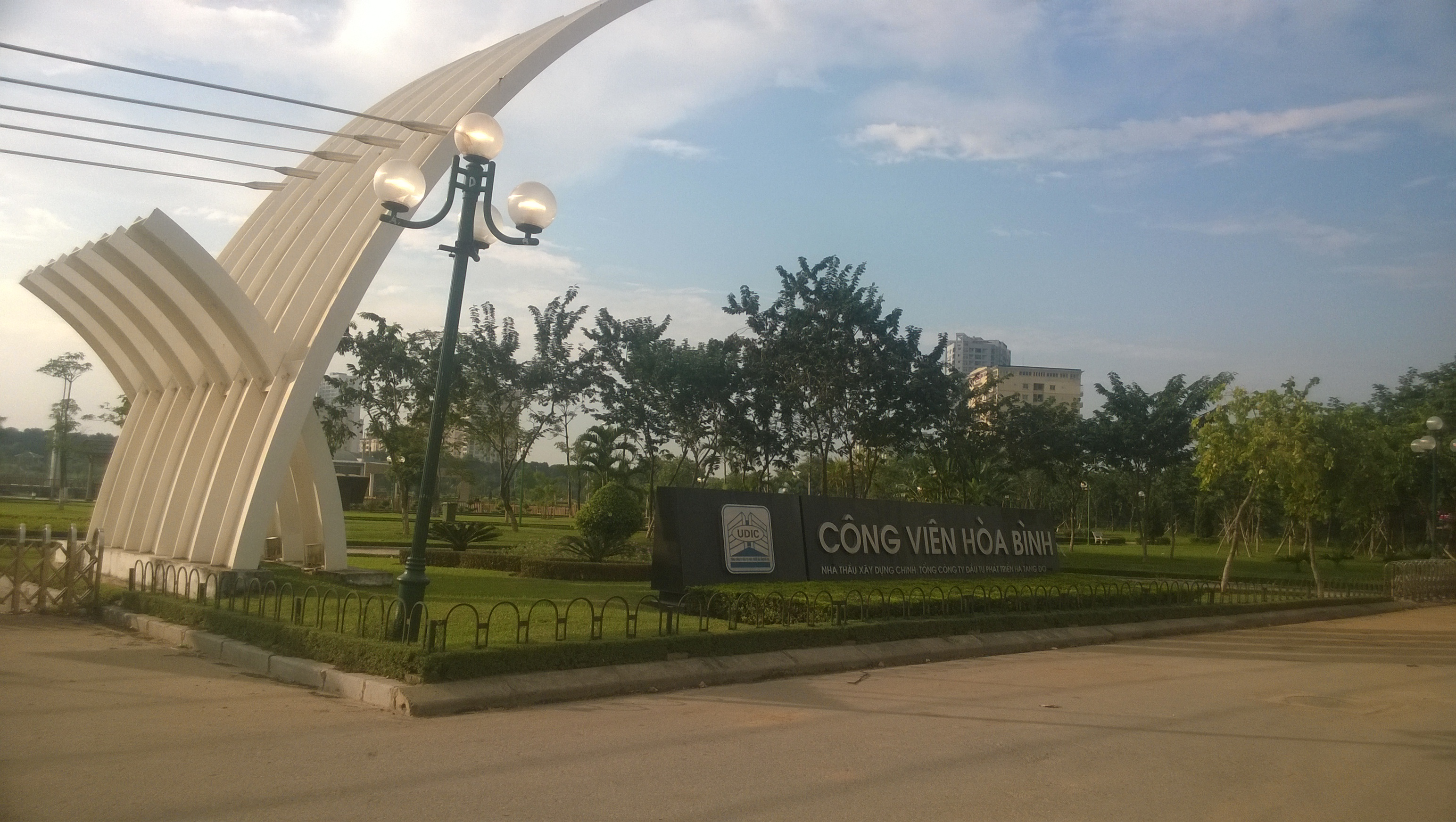
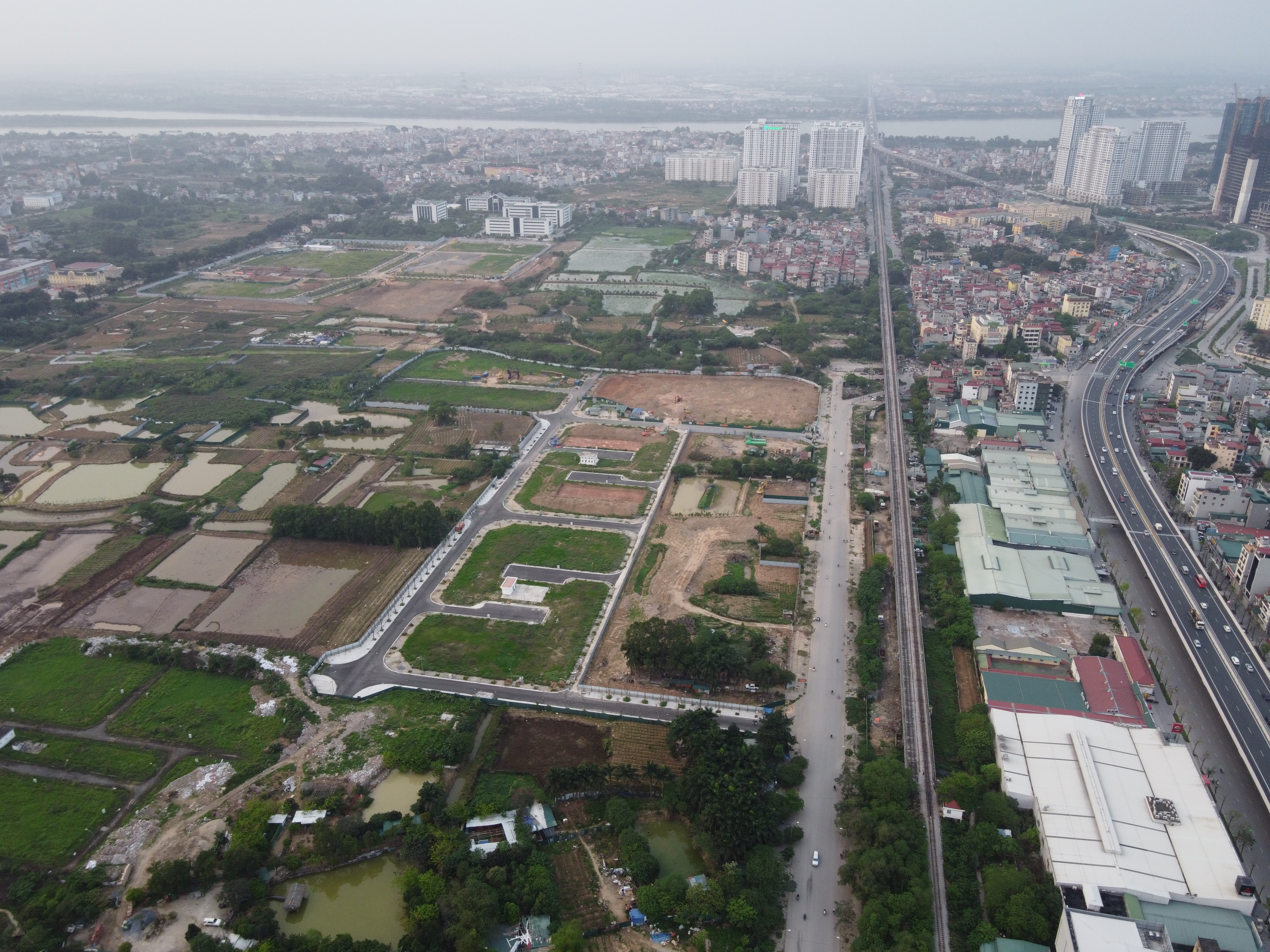
- Chèm Pagoda Đăm Pagoda Phú Diễn marketplace Thăng Long Bridge Peace Park Cổ Nhuế - Chèm urban area in construction
- Interactive map of Bắc Từ Liêm district
- Country: Vietnam
- Province: Hanoi
- Established: 2013
- Seat: Phúc Diễn ward
- Wards: 13 wards

Area
  - Total: 45.32 km^{2} (17.50 sq mi)

Population (2019)
  - Total: 335,110
  - Density: 7,394/km^{2} (19,150/sq mi)
- Time zone: UTC+7 (ICT)
- Area code: 24
- Website: bactuliem.hanoi.gov.vn

Bắc Từ Liêm is an urban district (quận) of Hanoi, the capital city of Vietnam. It was formed on 27 December 2013, when the rural Từ Liêm district was split into two urban districts: Bắc Từ Liêm and Nam Từ Liêm. The district currently has 13 wards, covering a total area of 45.32 square kilometres (17.50 sq mi). As of 2019, there were 335,110 people residing in the district, the population density is 7400 inhabitants per square kilometer.

== Geography ==
Bắc Từ Liêm is located at 21° 3′ 15″ N, 105° 40′ 56″ E, bordered by Đông Anh to the north across the Red River, Tây Hồ to the east, Cầu Giấy and Nam Từ Liêm to the south, and Hoài Đức and Đan Phượng to the west.

== Administrative divisions ==
Bắc Từ Liêm is divided into 13 wards:

- Thượng Cát
- Liên Mạc
- Thuỵ Phương
- Tây Tựu
- Đông Ngạc
- Đức Thắng
- Xuân Đỉnh
- Xuân Tảo
- Cổ Nhuế 1
- Cổ Nhuế 2
- Phú Diễn
- Phúc Diễn
- Minh Khai

== Education ==
- Hanoi University of Mining and Geology
- Le Quy Don Technical University
- Electric Power University
- Hanoi University of Natural Resources and Environment
- Hanoi University of Industry
