= Le Quy Don Technical University =

Higher education institute in Hanoi, Vietnam

Coordinates: 21°02′54″N 105°47′09″E

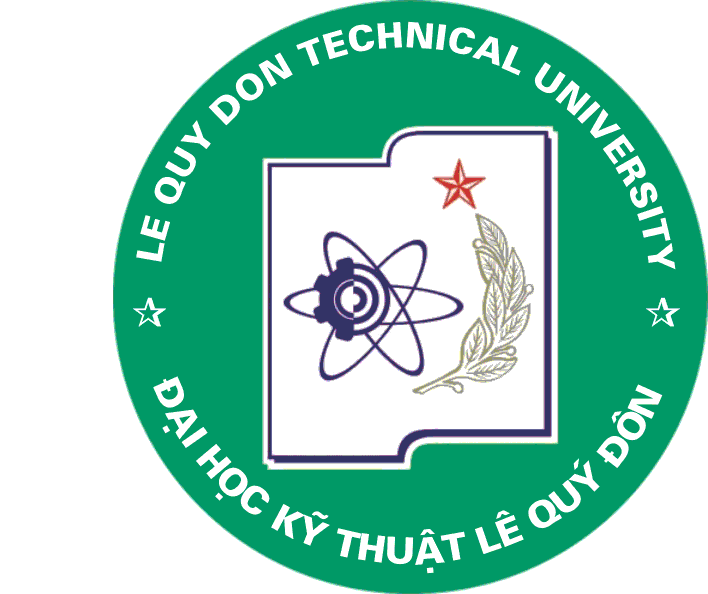
- Type: Technical university
- Established: October 28, 1966
- Administrative staff: 1,300 (2016)
- Students: 20,000 (2016)
- Location: Hanoi, Vietnam
- Campus: Bắc Từ Liêm District, Hanoi
- Website: mta.edu.vn www.lqdtu.edu.vn

Le Quy Don Technical University (Vietnamese: Đại học Kỹ thuật Lê Quý Đôn), is a university in Vietnam. It was founded in 1966 and is one of the Vietnam's national key universities. Le Quy Don Technical University has developed into an open, multidisciplinary, research-oriented, leading national university.

== History ==
- On August 8, 1966, the 146/CP decision of the Vietnamese government marked the establishment of the university as the Second Branch of the Polytechnic. It opened on October 28, 1966, and the first course of training officially commenced at the Second Branch by the representatives of the Ministry of Education and Training and the Ministry of National Defense;
- May 6, 1991 marked the 150/CT Decision of the Vietnamese government for the establishment of the Le Quy Don Technical University (LeTech);
- In 2007, there were 10,000 undergraduate and graduate students. The faculty consisted of about 800 professors and lecturers, among them 237 holding Doctor of Science and Ph.D. degrees;
- January 31, 2008: The university was recognized as a National Key University in Vietnam.
- As of 2016, over 20,000 undergraduates and over 2,000 graduates are learning at LeTech.

== See also ==
- Lê Quý Đôn - Vietnamese scholar after whom the school is named
