= Hanoi University of Natural Resources and Environment =

- Đại học Tài nguyên và Môi trường Hà Nội
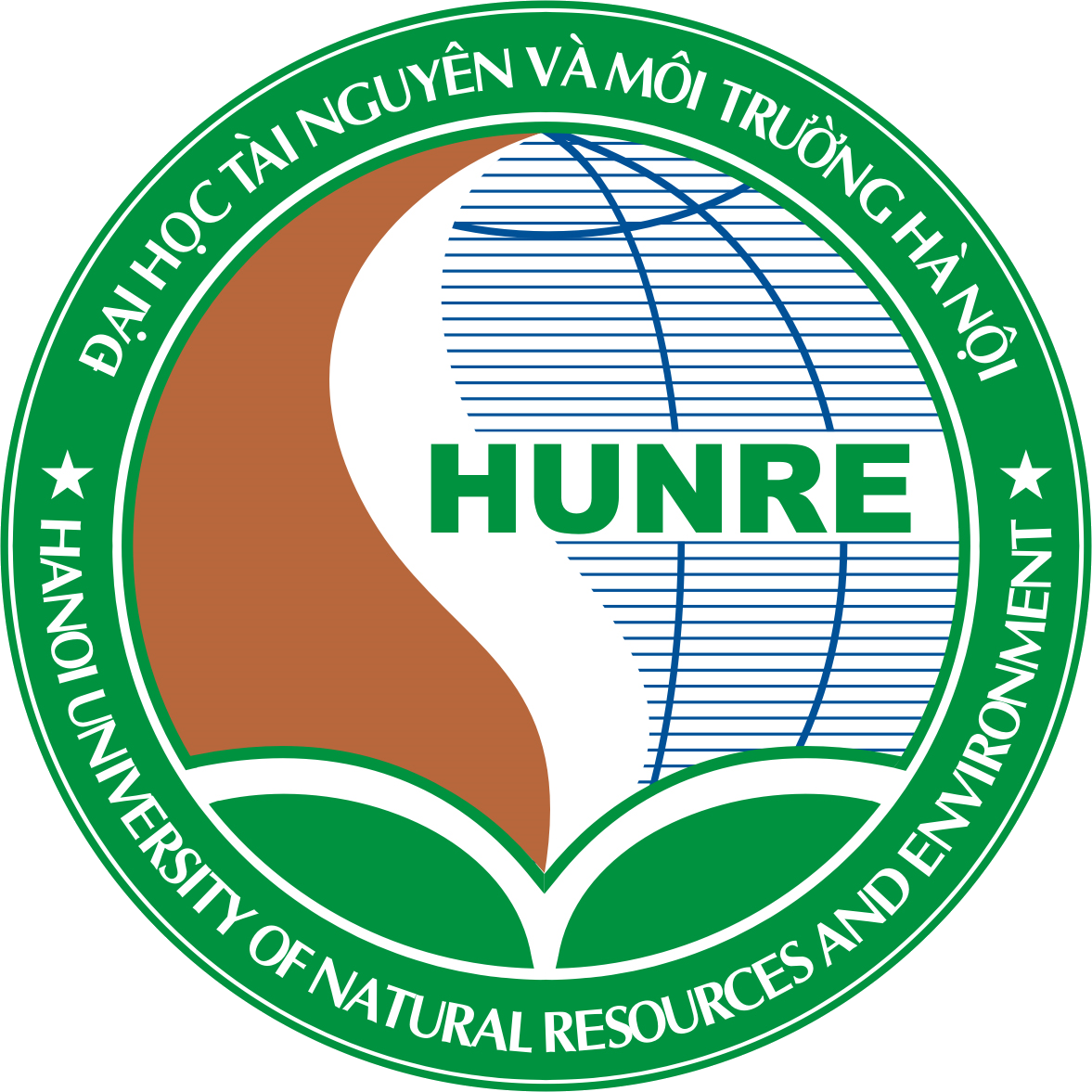
- Type: Public
- Established: 1955; 71 years ago 2010; 16 years ago-Upgrade to university
- President: Dr. Hoang Anh Huy
- Location: Main campus: No. 41A, Phu Dien Street, Phu Dien Ward, Bac Tu Liem District, Hanoi City.: Branch: No. 04, Tran Phu Street, Ba Dinh Ward, Bim Son Town, Thanh Hoa Province., Hanoi; Thanh Hoa., Vietnam; 21°02′47″N 105°45′45″E
- Campus: Suburban
- Colors: Green; SaddleBrown
- Website: en.hunre.edu.vn/hunre-en/trang-chu
- Location within Vietnam

Hanoi University of Natural Resources and Environment ( Vietnamese: Đại học Tài nguyên và Môi trường Hà Nội ) is a public university under the Ministry of Natural Resources and Environment and under the state management of the Ministry of Education and Training. The university is one of the National Key Universities of Vietnam.

The university has two campuses: Hanoi (main campus) and Thanh Hóa.

== History ==
Hanoi University of Natural Resources and Environment was established under the Prime Minister's Decision No. 1583 / QD-TTg of 23 August 2010, on the basis of upgrading Hanoi College of Natural Resources and Environment. The school has a tradition of training for over 60 years, formerly known as the Meteorological Elementary School. Up to now, the university is a multidisciplinary training institution with the task of training high quality human resources for the State management in the field of Natural Resources and Environment at university, postgraduate level from the central level. to localities, businesses to the community.

Hanoi University of Natural Resources and Environment is a public higher education institution in the national education system, under the Ministry of Natural Resources and Environment, under the state management of education and training. of the Ministry of Education and Training, with legal status, own seal and account.

With a history of 63 years (1955–2018), the university has trained over 22,000 Engineers, Bachelor, Professional Intermediate, Primary and Technical Workers in the fields of Meteorology, Hydrology and Cartography. Map, Land Management, Environmental Engineering, Environmental Management, Surveying – Map, Cadastre, Informatics ... for the country with: 14 elementary courses, 45 intermediate courses, 16 college courses, 27 university specialized courses, 8 articulated university courses, enrolling 8 regular university courses, 4 graduate masters courses.

=== Important historical milestones of the university's formation and development process ===
- 1955–2005: Hanoi Meteorological and Hygiene Staff School
  - Hanoi Meteorological and Hydrometeorology College was established under Decision No. 721 / QD-BGD & ĐT on 19 February 2001 of the Minister of Education and Training with the precursor of the Meteorological Primary School (1955–1960), Meteorological Intermediate School (1961–1966), Meteorological School (1967–1976), Meteorological and Cadre School (1976–1994), and Hanoi Meteorological and Personnel School (1994–2001) ).
- 1955–1960: Meteorological Primary School
- 1961–1966: Meteorological Intermediate School
- 1967–1976: School of Meteorological Officer
- 1976–1994: School of Meteorological and Hydrological Officer
- 1994–2001: Hanoi Meteorological and Hygiene Staff School
- 2001–2005: College of Meteorology and Hydrology Hanoi
- 1971–2005: Central Cadastral High School I:
  - Central Cadastral High School I was renamed from Cadastral High School I (Decision No. 179/2001 / QD-TCĐC, 6 June 2001 of the General Department of Land Administration), formerly known as Measuring Middle School Fixtures and Maps established in 1971.
- 1 September 1971: High School of Geodesy and Cartography
- 2001: Changed to Central Cadastral High School I
- 2005–2010: Hanoi College of Natural Resources and Environment (Incorporated Hanoi Meteorological and Hydrological College and Central Cadastral High School I)
  - The Hanoi College of Natural Resources and Environment was established under the Decision No. 2798 / QD-BGD & ĐT, 1 June 2005 of the Minister of Education and Training on the basis of merging the College of Meteorology and Hydrology Ha Internal and Central Cadastral High School I.
- 23 August 2010: Hanoi University of Natural Resources and Environment (according to Decision 1583/2010 / QD TTg, 23 August 2010 of the Prime Minister).
  - In the morning of 9 April 2018, announcing the decision to establish the Hanoi University of Natural Resources and Environment in Thanh Hoa province, with the address at 04 – Tran Phu, Ba Dinh Ward, Bim Son Town, Province Thanh Hoa.

== Infrastructure ==
=== Headquarters ===
No. 41A, Phu Dien Street, Phu Dien Ward, Bac Tu Liem District, Hanoi City.

- Total land area: 68,858 m^{2}
- Number of dormitories for students: More than 2000 places to live
- Two scientific information centers, libraries (traditional library and electronic library).

Secondary facility: No. 38, 69 Street, Duc Thang ward, Bac Tu Liem district, Hanoi City.

=== Affiliations ===
No. 04, Tran Phu Street, Ba Dinh Ward, Bim Son Town, Thanh Hoa Province.

=== Facility II ===
Vinh Kieu Service Urban Area, Dong Nguyen Ward, Tu Son Town, Bac Ninh Province.

The school's size is over 13 hectares and will train over 15,000 students and 600 lecturers. The total investment of the project is over VND 800 billion. The University of Natural Resources and Environment has approved investment policy.

== Department of training ==
=== University ===
Land Management

Natural resource management and environment

Marine management

Water resource management

Administration of travel and travel services

Business Administration

Climate change and sustainable development

Environmental engineering technology

Information Technology

Meteorology

Geodetic Engineering – Map

Geological engineering

Marine meteorology

Accountant

Natural resource economics

The law

Hydrological

English language

Real estate

Marketing – Communication

Hotel management

Logistics and Supply Chain Management

Biological applications.

=== Colleges ===
Land Management

Environmental technology

Geodetic engineering technology

=== University transfer ===
Land Management

Environmental resource management

Environmental engineering technology

Information Technology

Accountant

Meteorology

Geodetic Engineering – Map

Hydrological

=== Masters ===
Environmental science

Geodetic Engineering – Map

Hydrology

Land Management

Natural Resources and Environment Management

Meteorology and climatology

Accounting (Major: Accounting – Auditing & Financial Analysis).

Managing islands and coastal areas

Climate Change and Sustainable Development

=== Doctors ===
Environmental science

== Achievement ==
- 2003: Second-class Labor Medal
- 2005: Second-class Labor Medal
- 2010: First-Class Labor Medal
- 2012: The Friendship Medal of the People's Republic of Laos.
- 2014: Third-Class Labor Medal
- 2015: Second-class Labor Medal
