= Electric Power University =

Public university in Vietnam

Coordinates: 21.0468°N 105.7851°E

- Trường Đại học Điện Lực
- Former name: Electric Power College
- Type: Public
- Established: 2006; 20 years ago
- President: Associate Professor Dinh Van Chau, PhD
- Location: Hanoi, Vietnam
- Campus: urban
- Website: http://www.epu.edu.vn
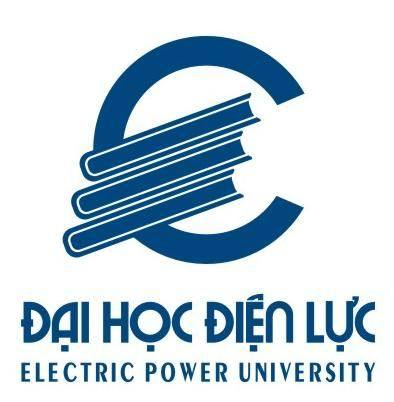

Electric Power University (EPU) in Vietnamese Trường Đại học Điện Lực is a public university in Hanoi, Vietnam.

== History ==
The forerunner of the Electricity University was the Hanoi School of Practical Technology, founded by the French in 1898. After 1954, the Vietnamese State split the Practical Technology School into Technical School I and Technical School II. In August 1962, Technical School I was renamed Electrical and Mechanical High School, on February 8, 1966, Electro Mechanical High School was split into Electric High School (later renamed Electrical High School I) and School. Middle School of Mechanical Engineering (now Hanoi University of Industry) .l April 2000, implementing the policy of rearranging the network of schools under the Vietnam Electricity Corporation (EVN), the Ministry of Industry decided. merged the in-service training school with Electricity High School I and named it Electric School No. I under Vietnam Electricity. On October 26, 2001, Ministry of Education and Training decided to upgrade Electric High School I to Electricity College. On May 19, 2006, with the Decision No. 111/2006 / QD-TTg, the Prime Minister allowed the establishment of the Electricity University on the basis of the College of Electricity. The Electricity University is a university training institution, directly under Vietnam Electricity Corporation, the Ministry of Industry, has the legal status, its own seal and account; The headquarters is located in Hanoi city

== Specialized Departments ==
Department of Electrical System;

Department of Energy Technology;

Department of Automation Technology;

Faculty of Information Technology;

Department of Electronics - Telecommunications;

Faculty of Mechanical Technology;

Department of Energy Management;

Department management.

Finance and accounting department.

Department of Basic Science;

Graduate School of Education

Department of Political Science

Department of Nuclear Power

== Achievements ==
In 1976 was awarded the Third Class Labor Medal;

In 1958, 2001 was awarded 2 Second-class Labor Medals;

In 2006 was awarded the First-Class Labor Medal;

In 2011 was awarded the Third Class Independence Medal;

There are also 5 certificates of merit from the Prime Minister.
