= Đông Anh district =

District of Hanoi

Đông Anh district Huyện Đông Anh
- District
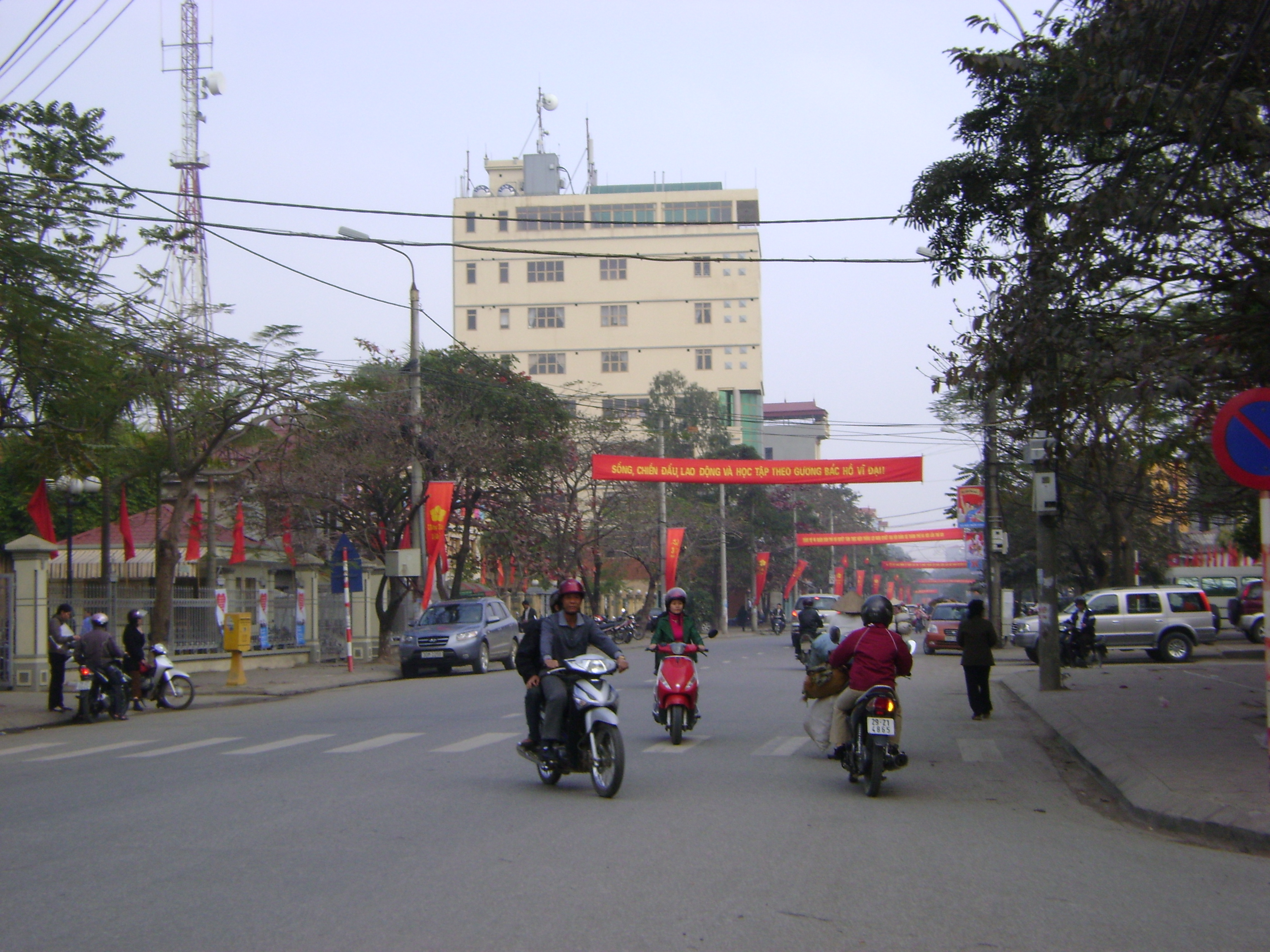
- Streets of Đông Anh, Hanoi, Vietnam

- Location within Hanoi
- Coordinates: 21.141440°N 105.844945°E
- Country: Vietnam
- Region: Red River Delta
- Municipality: Hanoi
- Capital: Đông Anh
- Time zone: UTC+7 (Indochina Time)

Đông Anh is a rural district (huyện) of Hanoi, the capital city of Vietnam. As of 2003, the district had a population of 277,795.

== History ==
In 257 BCE, King Thục Phán (An Dương Vương) established the Âu Lạc Kingdom and built Cổ Loa Citadel as its capital. The citadel is notable for its unique spiral architecture and advanced defensive design. After over 1000 years of Northern domination, Cổ Loa was once again the capital of an independent country when Ngô Quyền defeated the Southern Han army in 938.

The modern district of Đông Anh was officially established in October 1876 under the Nguyễn Dynasty, merging parts of Đông Ngàn (from Bắc Ninh Province), Kim Anh, and Yên Lãng (from Sơn Tây Province). In 1889, the district was briefly renamed Đông Khê before reverting to the name Đông Anh in 1903. After the August Revolution in 1945, Đông Anh was incorporated into Phúc Yên Province. It became part of Hanoi in 1961.

== Geography ==
Đông Anh district is bordered by Bắc Ninh province to the east, Gia Lâm district to the southeast, Mê Linh district to the west, the urban districts of Bắc Từ Liêm, Tây Hồ and Long Biên to the south, Sóc Sơn district to the north.

The district covers an area of 182 km^{2} (70 sq mi). The district capital lies at Đông Anh.

Đông Anh district is subdivided to 24 commune-level subdivisions, including the township of Đông Anh (district capital) and the rural communes of: Bắc Hồng, Cổ Loa, Đại Mạch, Đông Hội, Dục Tú, Hải Bối, Kim Chung, Kim Nỗ, Liên Hà, Mai Lâm, Nam Hồng, Nguyên Khê, Tàm Xá, Thụy Lâm, Tiên Dương, Uy Nỗ, Vân Hà, Vân Nội, Việt Hùng, Vĩnh Ngọc, Võng La, Xuân Canh, Xuân Nộn.

List of all administrative units under Đông Anh district

Name	Area (km^{2})	Population	Population density (people/km^{2})
Đông Anh township	4.39	32,384	7,376
Bắc Hồng commune	7.20	15,578	2,163
Cổ Loa commune	8.42	20,583	2,444
Đại Mạch commune	8.42	15,810	1,877
Đông Hội commune	7.24	15,438	2,132
Dục Tú commune	8.69	19,615	2,257
Hải Bối commune	8.26	19,762	2,392
Kim Chung commune	7.69	21,894	2,847
Kim Nỗ commune	6.51	16,577	2,546
Liên Hà commune	8.21	19,502	2,375
Mai Lâm commune	6.18	15,202	2,459
Nam Hồng commune	9.15	17,759	1,940
Nguyên Khê commune	7.92	16,276	2,055
Tàm Xá commune	4.57	15,158	3,316
Thụy Lâm commune	11.26	21,902	1,945
Tiên Dương commune	10.14	20,408	2,012
Uy Nỗ commune	7.72	19,329	2,503
Vân Hà commune	5.23	15,126	2,427
Vân Nội commune	6.52	15,379	2,358
Việt Hùng commune	8.66	18,654	2,154
Vĩnh Ngọc commune	9.56	17,990	1,881
Võng La commune	6.44	15,268	2,370
Xuân Canh commune	6.30	15,246	2,420
Xuân Nộn commune	10.88	16,378	1,505
Total	185.68	437,308	2,355

Source: People's Committee of Dong Anh district (2023).
