= Đan Phượng district =

Đan Phượng district Huyện Đan Phượng
- Rural District
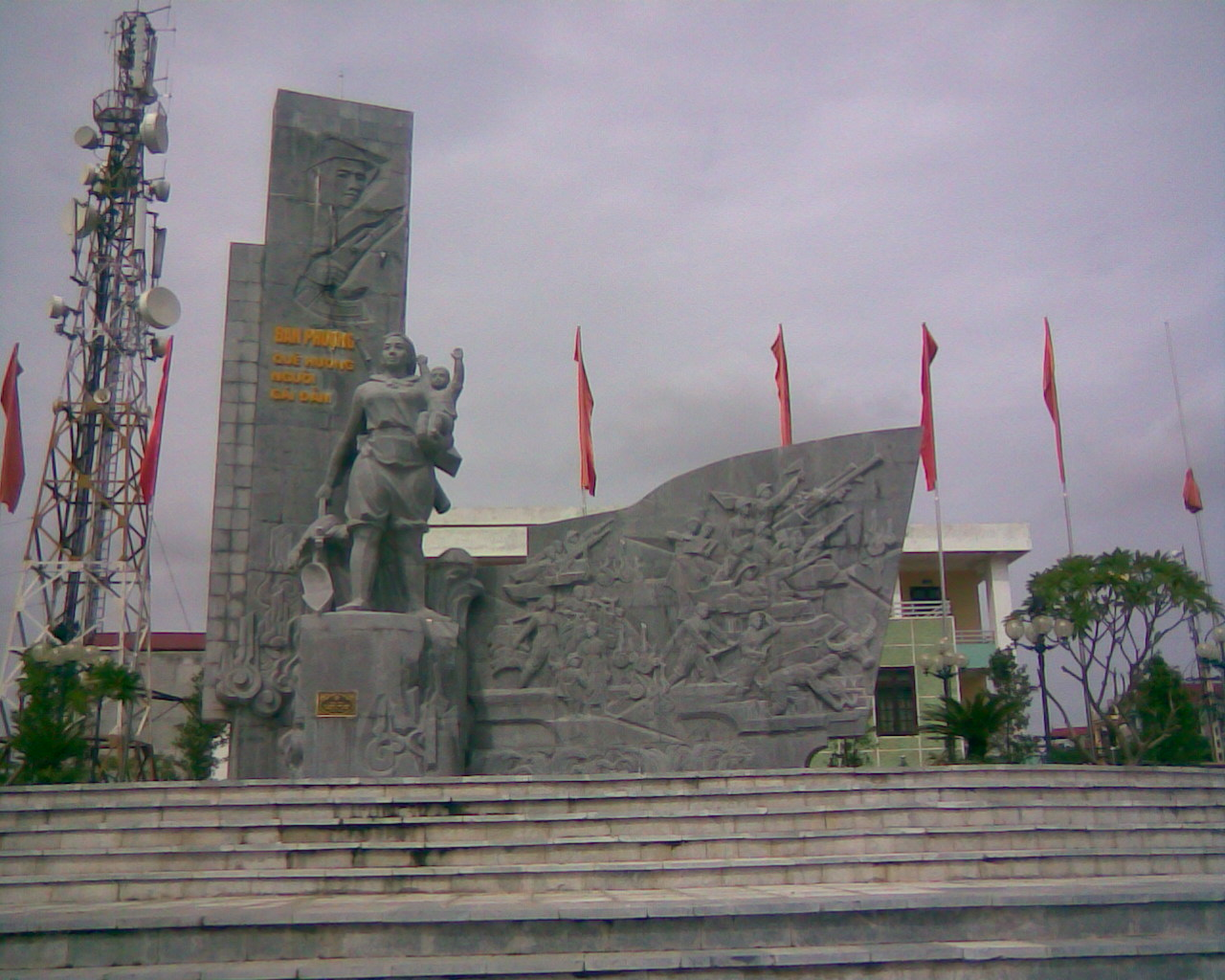
- The Đan Phượng women monument in the center of Phùng township.

- Location within Hanoi
- Coordinates: 21.086416°N 105.663329°E
- Country: Vietnam
- Region: Red River Delta
- Municipality: Hanoi
- Central hall: Phùng township

Government
  - Type: Rural District
- Time zone: UTC+7 (Indochina Time)
- ZIP code: 13000

Đan Phượng is a rural district of Hanoi in the Red River Delta region of Vietnam.

== Geography ==
As of 2003, the district had a population of 132,921. The district covers an area of 77 km^{2} (30 sq mi). The district capital lies at Phùng.

Đan Phượng district is bordered by Đông Anh district and Bắc Từ Liêm district to the east, Phúc Thọ district to the west, Hoài Đức district to the south and Mê Linh district to the north.

The district is subdivided to 16 commune-level subdivisions, including the township of Phùng (district capital) and the rural communes of: Đan Phượng, Đồng Tháp, Hạ Mỗ, Hồng Hà, Liên Hà, Liên Hồng, Liên Trung, Phương Đình, Song Phượng, Tân Hội, Tân Lập, Thọ An, Thọ Xuân, Thượng Mỗ, Trung Châu.
