= Mê Linh district =

Mê Linh district Huyện Mê Linh
- District
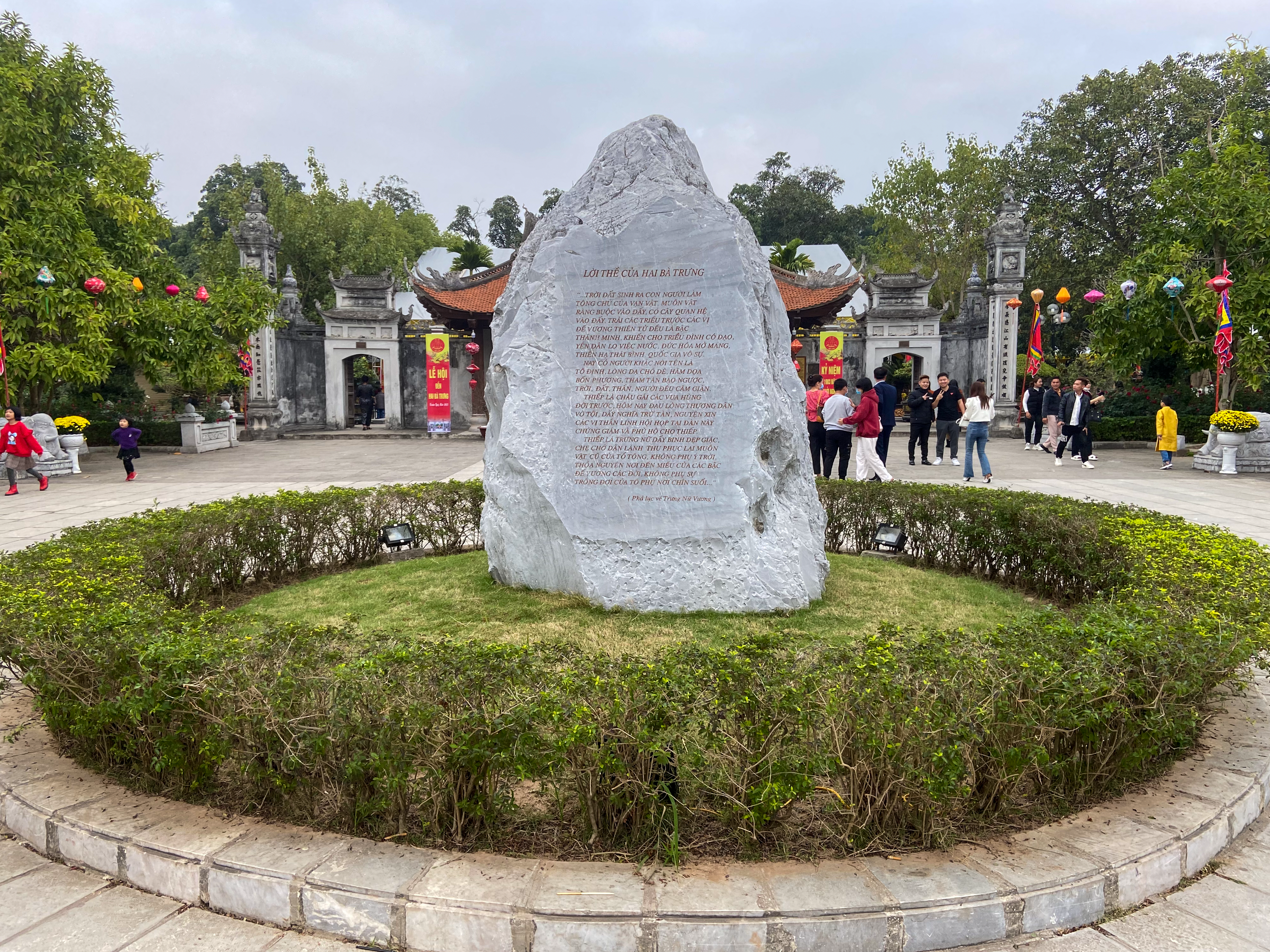
- Stele in Hai Bà Temple.

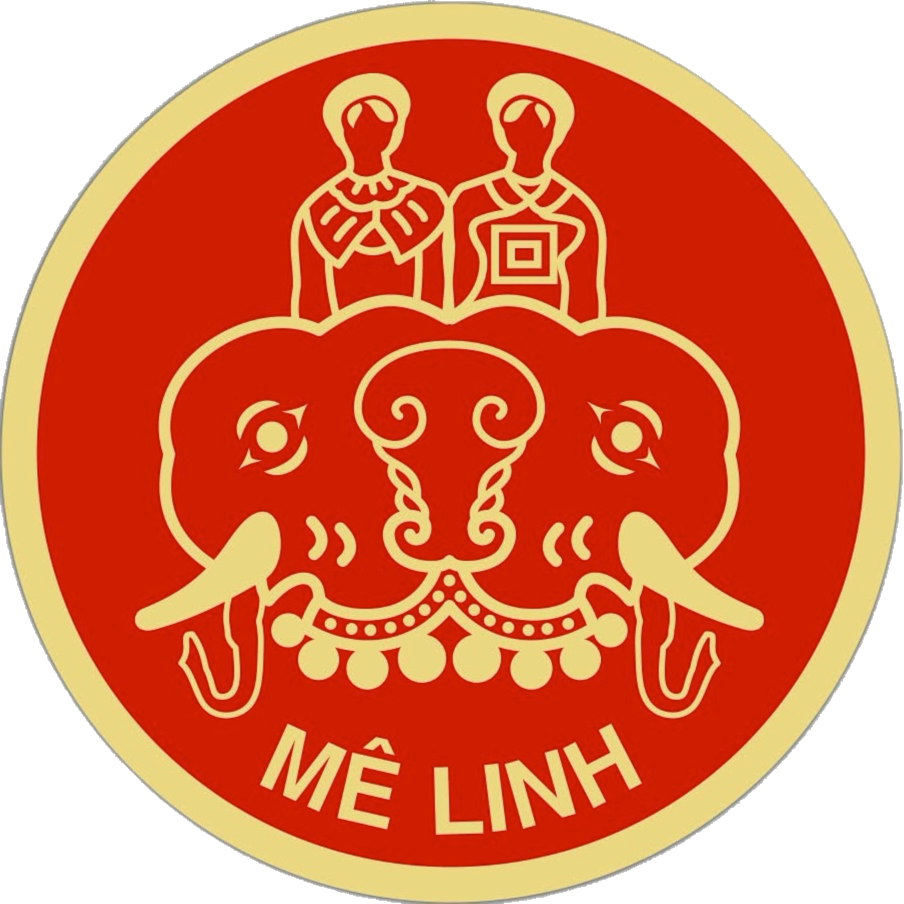
- Seal

- Location within Hanoi
- Coordinates: 21.184598°N 105.719097°E
- Country: Vietnam
- Region: Red River Delta
- Municipality: Hanoi
- Capital: Đại Thịnh
- Time zone: UTC+7 (Indochina Time)

Mê Linh is a former rural district (huyện) of Hanoi, formerly of Vĩnh Phúc province, in the Red River Delta region of northern Vietnam.

Mê Linh district is bordered by Đông Anh district to the east, Sóc Sơn district to the northeast, Đan Phượng district to the south, Vĩnh Phúc province to the west and north.

The district is subdivided into 18 commune-level subdivisions, including the townships of Quang Minh, Chi Đông and the rural communes of Đại Thịnh (district capital), Chu Phan, Hoàng Kim, Kim Hoa, Liên Mạc, Mê Linh, Tam Đồng, Thạch Đà, Thanh Lâm, Tiền Phong, Tiến Thắng, Tiến Thịnh, Tráng Việt, Tự Lập, Văn Khê, Vạn Yên.

== History ==
The area now known as Mê Linh has been inhabited since the Văn Lang Kingdom and was the birthplace of the Trưng Sisters, Trưng Trắc and Trưng Nhị. In 40 AD, they initiated an uprising against the Han dynasty's domination, establishing their capital in Mê Linh. Although the rebellion was eventually suppressed in 43 AD, the sisters' legacy endures, and they are celebrated as symbols of Vietnamese resistance and patriotism.

In modern administrative history, Mê Linh was part of Vĩnh Phúc Province until August 1, 2008, when it was incorporated into Hanoi as part of a significant expansion of the capital's boundaries.

== Geography ==
Mê Linh District is situated in the northwest of Hanoi, approximately 29 kilometers from the city center. It shares borders with:

- Sóc Sơn District to the northeast,
- Đông Anh District to the east,
- Đan Phượng District to the south,
- Phúc Thọ District to the southwest,
- Vĩnh Phúc Province to the west and north.

The district comprises 18 commune-level subdivisions, including the townships of Quang Minh and Chi Đông, and 16 rural communes.
