= List of district-level subdivisions in Vietnam =

This is a list of district-level subdivisions (Vietnamese: đơn vị hành chính cấp huyện) of Vietnam. This level includes: district-level cities (thành phố thuộc Thành phố trực thuộc trung ương, thành phố thuộc Tỉnh), towns (thị xã), rural districts (huyện) and urban districts (quận). These subdivisions are further divided into communes (xã) in rural areas (subdivisions under huyện, suburbans of towns and quận) and ward (phường) (subdivisions under cities and towns) in urban areas, and townships (thị trấn).

District-level subdivisions were abolished in 2025.

The urban areas (cities and towns) in the district-level are classified into 5 classes (from 1st to 2nd class urban area is recognized by Prime Minister of Vietnam, 3rd to 4th class is recognized by Ministry of Construction (Vietnam), 5th class is recognized by provincial-class People's Committee).

- 1st class urban area: Thủ Đức, Vinh, Đà Lạt, Nha Trang, Quy Nhơn, Buôn Ma Thuột, Thái Nguyên, Nam Định, Việt Trì, Vũng Tàu, Hạ Long, Thanh Hóa, Biên Hòa, Mỹ Tho, Thủ Dầu Một, Bắc Ninh, Hải Dương, Pleiku, Long Xuyên, Rạch Giá, Phú Quốc.
- 2nd class urban area: Phan Thiết, Cà Mau, Tuy Hòa, Uông Bí, Thái Bình, Bạc Liêu, Ninh Bình, Đồng Hới, Vĩnh Yên, Lào Cai, Bà Rịa, Bắc Giang, Phan Rang–Tháp Chàm, Châu Đốc, Cẩm Phả, Quảng Ngãi, Tam Kỳ, Trà Vinh, Sa Đéc, Móng Cái, Phủ Lý, Bến Tre, Hà Tĩnh, Lạng Sơn, Sơn La, Tân An, Vị Thanh, Cao Lãnh.
- 3rd class urban area: Yên Bái, Điện Biên Phủ, Hoà Bình, Sóc Trăng, Hội An, Hưng Yên, Vĩnh Long, Đông Hà, Kon Tum, Bảo Lộc, Tuyên Quang, Hà Giang, Cam Ranh, Cao Bằng, Lai Châu, Tây Ninh, Bắc Kạn, Tam Điệp, Sông Công, Sầm Sơn, Phúc Yên, Hà Tiên, Đồng Xoài, Chí Linh, Long Khánh, Gia Nghĩa, Dĩ An, Ngã Bảy, Thuận An, Sơn Tây, Cửa Lò, Phú Thọ, Bỉm Sơn, Gò Công, La Gi, Từ Sơn, Bến Cát, Tân Uyên, Hồng Ngự, Sông Cầu, Phổ Yên, Long Mỹ, Tân Châu, Cai Lậy, Thủy Nguyên.
- 4th class urban area: recognized by Ministry of Construction (Vietnam).
- 5th class urban area (for townships): not in district-level.

The district-level subdivisions are tabulated alphabetically:

No.	Cities, towns, districts	Province/Municipalities	Notes
1	A Lưới	Huế	
2	An Biên	Kiên Giang	
3	An Dương	Hải Phòng	urban district
4	An Khê	Gia Lai	town
5	An Lão	Hải Phòng	
6	An Lão	Bình Định	
7	An Minh	Kiên Giang	
8	An Nhơn	Bình Định	town
9	An Phú	An Giang	
10	Anh Sơn	Nghệ An	
11	Ayun Pa	Gia Lai	town
12	Ân Thi	Hưng Yên	
13	Ba Bể	Bắc Kạn	
14	Ba Chẽ	Quảng Ninh	
15	Ba Đình	Hà Nội	urban district
16	Ba Đồn	Quảng Bình	town
17	Ba Tơ	Quảng Ngãi	
18	Ba Tri	Bến Tre	
19	Ba Vì	Hà Nội	
20	Bà Rịa	Bà Rịa–Vũng Tàu	city
21	Bá Thước	Thanh Hóa	
22	Bác Ái	Ninh Thuận	
23	Bạc Liêu	Bạc Liêu	city
24	Bạch Long Vĩ	Hải Phòng	
25	Bạch Thông	Bắc Kạn	
26	Bảo Lạc	Cao Bằng	
27	Bảo Lâm	Cao Bằng	
28	Bảo Lâm	Lâm Đồng	
29	Bảo Lộc	Lâm Đồng	city
30	Bảo Thắng	Lào Cai	
31	Bảo Yên	Lào Cai	
32	Bát Xát	Lào Cai	
33	Bàu Bàng	Bình Dương	
34	Bắc Bình	Bình Thuận	
35	Bắc Giang	Bắc Giang	city
36	Bắc Hà	Lào Cai	
37	Bắc Kạn	Bắc Kạn	city
38	Bắc Mê	Hà Giang	
39	Bắc Ninh	Bắc Ninh	city
40	Bắc Quang	Hà Giang	
41	Bắc Sơn	Lạng Sơn	
42	Bắc Tân Uyên	Bình Dương	
43	Bắc Trà My	Quảng Nam	
44	Bắc Từ Liêm	Hà Nội	urban district
45	Bắc Yên	Sơn La	
46	Bến Cát	Bình Dương	city
47	Bến Cầu	Tây Ninh	
48	Bến Lức	Long An	
49	Bến Tre	Bến Tre	city
50	Biên Hòa	Đồng Nai	city
51	Bỉm Sơn	Thanh Hóa	town
52	Bình Chánh	Thành phố Hồ Chí Minh	
53	Bình Đại	Bến Tre	
54	Bình Gia	Lạng Sơn	
55	Bình Giang	Hải Dương	
56	Bình Liêu	Quảng Ninh	
57	Bình Long	Bình Phước	town
58	Bình Lục	Hà Nam	
59	Bình Minh	Vĩnh Long	town
60	Bình Sơn	Quảng Ngãi	
61	Bình Tân	Thành phố Hồ Chí Minh	urban district
62	Bình Tân	Vĩnh Long	
63	Bình Thạnh	Thành phố Hồ Chí Minh	urban district
64	Bình Thủy	Cần Thơ	urban district
65	Bình Xuyên	Vĩnh Phúc	
66	Bố Trạch	Quảng Bình	
67	Bù Đăng	Bình Phước	
68	Bù Đốp	Bình Phước	
69	Bù Gia Mập	Bình Phước	
70	Buôn Đôn	Đắk Lắk	
71	Buôn Hồ	Đắk Lắk	town
72	Buôn Ma Thuột	Đắk Lắk	city
73	Cà Mau	Cà Mau	city
74	Cai Lậy	Tiền Giang	town
75	Cai Lậy	Tiền Giang	
76	Cái Bè	Tiền Giang	
77	Cái Nước	Cà Mau	
78	Cái Răng	Cần Thơ	urban district
79	Cam Lâm	Khánh Hòa	
80	Cam Lộ	Quảng Trị	
81	Cam Ranh	Khánh Hòa	city
82	Can Lộc	Hà Tĩnh	
83	Càng Long	Trà Vinh	
84	Cao Bằng	Cao Bằng	city
85	Cao Lãnh	Đồng Tháp	city
86	Cao Lãnh	Đồng Tháp	
87	Cao Lộc	Lạng Sơn	
88	Cao Phong	Hòa Bình	
89	Cát Hải	Hải Phòng	
90	Cẩm Giàng	Hải Dương	
91	Cẩm Khê	Phú Thọ	
92	Cẩm Lệ	Đà Nẵng	urban district
93	Cẩm Mỹ	Đồng Nai	
94	Cẩm Phả	Quảng Ninh	city
95	Cẩm Thủy	Thanh Hóa	
96	Cẩm Xuyên	Hà Tĩnh	
97	Cần Đước	Long An	
98	Cần Giờ	Thành phố Hồ Chí Minh	
99	Cần Giuộc	Long An	
100	Cầu Giấy	Hà Nội	urban district
101	Cầu Kè	Trà Vinh	
102	Cầu Ngang	Trà Vinh	
103	Châu Đốc	An Giang	city
104	Châu Đức	Bà Rịa–Vũng Tàu	
105	Châu Phú	An Giang	
106	Châu Thành	An Giang	
107	Châu Thành	Bến Tre	
108	Châu Thành	Đồng Tháp	
109	Châu Thành	Hậu Giang	
110	Châu Thành	Kiên Giang	
111	Châu Thành	Long An	
112	Châu Thành	Sóc Trăng	
113	Châu Thành	Tây Ninh	
114	Châu Thành	Tiền Giang	
115	Châu Thành	Trà Vinh	
116	Châu Thành A	Hậu Giang	
117	Chi Lăng	Lạng Sơn	
118	Chí Linh	Hải Dương	city
119	Chiêm Hoá	Tuyên Quang	
120	Chợ Đồn	Bắc Kạn	
121	Chợ Gạo	Tiền Giang	
122	Chợ Lách	Bến Tre	
123	Chợ Mới	Bắc Kạn	
124	Chợ Mới	An Giang	
125	Chơn Thành	Bình Phước	
126	Chũ	Bắc Giang	town
127	Chư Păh	Gia Lai	
128	Chư Prông	Gia Lai	
129	Chư Pưh	Gia Lai	
130	Chư Sê	Gia Lai	
131	Chương Mỹ	Hà Nội	
132	Con Cuông	Nghệ An	
133	Cô Tô	Quảng Ninh	
134	Côn Đảo	Bà Rịa–Vũng Tàu	
135	Cồn Cỏ	Quảng Trị	
136	Cờ Đỏ	Cần Thơ	
137	Cù Lao Dung	Sóc Trăng	
138	Củ Chi	Thành phố Hồ Chí Minh	
139	Cư Kuin	Đắk Lắk	
140	Cư Jút	Đắk Nông	
141	Cư M'gar	Đắk Lắk	
142	Dầu Tiếng	Bình Dương	
143	Di Linh	Lâm Đồng	
144	Dĩ An	Bình Dương	city
145	Diên Khánh	Khánh Hòa	
146	Diễn Châu	Nghệ An	
147	Duy Tiên	Hà Nam	town
148	Duy Xuyên	Quảng Nam	
149	Duyên Hải	Trà Vinh	town
150	Duyên Hải	Trà Vinh	
151	Dương Kinh	Hải Phòng	urban district
152	Dương Minh Châu	Tây Ninh	
153	Đa Krông	Quảng Trị	
154	Đà Bắc	Hòa Bình	
155	Đà Lạt	Lâm Đồng	city
156	Đạ Huoai	Lâm Đồng	
157	Đại Lộc	Quảng Nam	
158	Đại Từ	Thái Nguyên	
159	Đắk Đoa	Gia Lai	
160	Đắk Pơ	Gia Lai	
161	Đan Phượng	Hà Nội	
162	Đắk Glei	Kon Tum	
163	Đăk Glong	Đắk Nông	
164	Đắk Hà	Kon Tum	
165	Đăk Mil	Đắk Nông	
166	Đăk R'Lấp	Đắk Nông	
167	Đăk Song	Đắk Nông	
168	Đắk Tô	Kon Tum	
169	Đầm Dơi	Cà Mau	
170	Đầm Hà	Quảng Ninh	
171	Đam Rông	Lâm Đồng	
172	Đất Đỏ	Bà Rịa–Vũng Tàu	
173	Điện Bàn	Quảng Nam	town
174	Điện Biên	Điện Biên	
175	Điện Biên Đông	Điện Biên	
176	Điện Biên Phủ	Điện Biên	city
177	Đình Lập	Lạng Sơn	
178	Định Hóa	Thái Nguyên	
179	Định Quán	Đồng Nai	
180	Đoan Hùng	Phú Thọ	
181	Đô Lương	Nghệ An	
182	Đồ Sơn	Hải Phòng	urban district
183	Đông Anh	Hà Nội	
184	Đông Giang	Quảng Nam	
185	Đông Hà	Quảng Trị	city
186	Đông Hải	Bạc Liêu	
187	Đông Hòa	Phú Yên	town
188	Đông Hưng	Thái Bình	
189	Đông Triều	Quảng Ninh	city
190	Đồng Hới	Quảng Bình	city
191	Đồng Hỷ	Thái Nguyên	
192	Đồng Phú	Bình Phước	
193	Đồng Văn	Hà Giang	
194	Đồng Xoài	Bình Phước	city
195	Đồng Xuân	Phú Yên	
196	Đống Đa	Hà Nội	urban district
197	Đơn Dương	Lâm Đồng	
198	Đức Cơ	Gia Lai	
199	Đức Hòa	Long An	
200	Đức Huệ	Long An	
201	Đức Linh	Bình Thuận	
202	Đức Phổ	Quảng Ngãi	
203	Đức Thọ	Hà Tĩnh	
204	Đức Trọng	Lâm Đồng	
205	Ea H'leo	Đắk Lắk	
206	Ea Kar	Đắk Lắk	
207	Ea Súp	Đắk Lắk	
208	Gia Bình	Bắc Ninh	
209	Gia Lâm	Hà Nội	
210	Gia Lộc	Hải Dương	
211	Gia Nghĩa	Đắk Nông	city
212	Gia Viễn	Ninh Bình	
213	Giá Rai	Bạc Liêu	town
214	Giang Thành	Kiên Giang	
215	Giao Thủy	Nam Định	
216	Gio Linh	Quảng Trị	
217	Giồng Riềng	Kiên Giang	
218	Giồng Trôm	Bến Tre	
219	Gò Công	Tiền Giang	city
220	Gò Công Đông	Tiền Giang	
221	Gò Công Tây	Tiền Giang	
222	Gò Dầu	Tây Ninh	
223	Gò Quao	Kiên Giang	
224	Gò Vấp	Thành phố Hồ Chí Minh	urban district
225	Hà Đông	Hà Nội	urban district
226	Hà Giang	Hà Giang	city
227	Hà Quảng	Cao Bằng	
228	Hà Tiên	Kiên Giang	city
229	Hà Tĩnh	Hà Tĩnh	city
230	Hà Trung	Thanh Hóa	
231	Hạ Hòa	Phú Thọ	
232	Hạ Lang	Cao Bằng	
233	Hạ Long	Quảng Ninh	city
234	Hai Bà Trưng	Hà Nội	urban district
235	Hải An	Hải Phòng	urban district
236	Hải Châu	Đà Nẵng	urban district
237	Hải Dương	Hải Dương	city
238	Hải Hà	Quảng Ninh	
239	Hải Hậu	Nam Định	
240	Hải Lăng	Quảng Trị	
241	Hàm Tân	Bình Thuận	
242	Hàm Thuận Bắc	Bình Thuận	
243	Hàm Thuận Nam	Bình Thuận	
244	Hàm Yên	Tuyên Quang	
245	Hậu Lộc	Thanh Hóa	
246	Hiệp Đức	Quảng Nam	
247	Hiệp Hòa	Bắc Giang	
248	Hoa Lư	Ninh Bình	city
249	Hòa An	Cao Bằng	
250	Hòa Bình	Bạc Liêu	
251	Hòa Bình	Hòa Bình	city
252	Hòa Thành	Tây Ninh	town
253	Hòa Vang	Đà Nẵng	
254	Hoài Ân	Bình Định	
255	Hoài Đức	Hà Nội	
256	Hoài Nhơn	Bình Định	town
257	Hoàn Kiếm	Hà Nội	urban district
258	Hoàng Mai	Hà Nội	urban district
259	Hoàng Mai	Nghệ An	town
260	Hoàng Sa	Đà Nẵng	
261	Hoàng Su Phì	Hà Giang	
262	Hoằng Hóa	Thanh Hóa	
263	Hóc Môn	Thành phố Hồ Chí Minh	
264	Hòn Đất	Kiên Giang	
265	Hội An	Quảng Nam	town
266	Hồng Bàng	Hải Phòng	urban district
267	Hồng Dân	Bạc Liêu	
268	Hồng Lĩnh	Hà Tĩnh	town
269	Hồng Ngự	Đồng Tháp	city
270	Hồng Ngự	Đồng Tháp	
271	Hớn Quản	Bình Phước	
273	Hưng Hà	Thái Bình	
274	Hưng Nguyên	Nghệ An	
275	Hưng Yên	Hưng Yên	city
276	Hương Khê	Hà Tĩnh	
277	Hương Sơn	Hà Tĩnh	
278	Hương Thủy	Huế	town
279	Hương Trà	Huế	town
280	Hướng Hóa	Quảng Trị	
281	Hữu Lũng	Lạng Sơn	
282	Ia Grai	Gia Lai	
283	Ia H'Drai	Kon Tum	
284	Ia Pa	Gia Lai	
285	K'Bang	Gia Lai	
286	Kế Sách	Sóc Trăng	
287	Khánh Sơn	Khánh Hòa	
288	Khánh Vĩnh	Khánh Hòa	
289	Khoái Châu	Hưng Yên	
290	Kiên Hải	Kiên Giang	
291	Kiên Lương	Kiên Giang	
292	Kiến An	Hải Phòng	urban district
293	Kiến Thuỵ	Hải Phòng	
294	Kiến Tường	Long An	town
295	Kiến Xương	Thái Bình	
296	Kim Bảng	Hà Nam	town
297	Kim Bôi	Hòa Bình	
298	Kim Động	Hưng Yên	
299	Kim Sơn	Ninh Bình	
300	Kim Thành	Hải Dương	
301	Kinh Môn	Hải Dương	town
302	Kon Plông	Kon Tum	
303	Kon Rẫy	Kon Tum	
304	Kon Tum	Kon Tum	city
305	Kông Chro	Gia Lai	
306	Krông Ana	Đắk Lắk	
307	Krông Bông	Đắk Lắk	
308	Krông Buk	Đắk Lắk	
309	Krông Năng	Đắk Lắk	
310	Krông Nô	Đắk Nông	
311	Krông Pa	Gia Lai	
312	Krông Pắk	Đắk Lắk	
313	Kỳ Anh	Hà Tĩnh	town
314	Kỳ Anh	Hà Tĩnh	
315	Kỳ Sơn	Nghệ An	
316	La Gi	Bình Thuận	town
317	Lạc Dương	Lâm Đồng	
318	Lạc Sơn	Hòa Bình	
319	Lạc Thủy	Hòa Bình	
320	Lai Châu	Lai Châu	city
321	Lai Vung	Đồng Tháp	
322	Lang Chánh	Thanh Hóa	
323	Lạng Giang	Bắc Giang	
324	Lạng Sơn	Lạng Sơn	city
325	Lào Cai	Lào Cai	city
326	Lắk	Đắk Lắk	
327	Lâm Bình	Tuyên Quang	
328	Lâm Hà	Lâm Đồng	
329	Lâm Thao	Phú Thọ	
330	Lấp Vò	Đồng Tháp	
331	Lập Thạch	Vĩnh Phúc	
332	Lê Chân	Hải Phòng	urban district
333	Lệ Thủy	Quảng Bình	
334	Liên Chiểu	Đà Nẵng	urban district
335	Long Biên	Hà Nội	urban district
336	Long Điền	Bà Rịa–Vũng Tàu	
337	Long Hồ	Vĩnh Long	
338	Long Khánh	Đồng Nai	city
339	Long Mỹ	Hậu Giang	town
340	Long Mỹ	Hậu Giang	
341	Long Phú	Sóc Trăng	
342	Long Thành	Đồng Nai	
343	Long Xuyên	An Giang	city
344	Lộc Bình	Lạng Sơn	
345	Lộc Hà	Hà Tĩnh	
346	Lộc Ninh	Bình Phước	
347	Lục Nam	Bắc Giang	
348	Lục Ngạn	Bắc Giang	
349	Lục Yên	Yên Bái	
350	Lương Sơn	Hòa Bình	
351	Lương Tài	Bắc Ninh	
352	Lý Nhân	Hà Nam	
353	Lý Sơn	Quảng Ngãi	
354	Mai Châu	Hòa Bình	
355	Mai Sơn	Sơn La	
356	Mang Thít	Vĩnh Long	
357	Mang Yang	Gia Lai	
358	M'Đrăk	Đắk Lắk	
359	Mèo Vạc	Hà Giang	
360	Mê Linh	Hà Nội	
361	Minh Hóa	Quảng Bình	
362	Minh Long	Quảng Ngãi	
363	Mỏ Cày Bắc	Bến Tre	
364	Mỏ Cày Nam	Bến Tre	
365	Móng Cái	Quảng Ninh	city
366	Mộ Đức	Quảng Ngãi	
367	Mộc Châu	Sơn La	town
368	Mộc Hóa	Long An	
369	Mù Cang Chải	Yên Bái	
370	Mường Ảng	Điện Biên	
371	Mường Chà	Điện Biên	
372	Mường Khương	Lào Cai	
373	Mường La	Sơn La	
374	Mường Lát	Thanh Hóa	
375	Mường Lay	Điện Biên	town
376	Mường Nhé	Điện Biên	
377	Mường Tè	Lai Châu	
378	Mỹ Đức	Hà Nội	
379	Mỹ Hào	Hưng Yên	town
380	Mỹ Tho	Tiền Giang	city
381	Mỹ Tú	Sóc Trăng	
382	Mỹ Xuyên	Sóc Trăng	
383	Na Hang	Tuyên Quang	
384	Na Rì	Bắc Kạn	
385	Nam Đàn	Nghệ An	
386	Nam Định	Nam Định	city
387	Nam Giang	Quảng Nam	
388	Nam Sách	Hải Dương	
389	Nam Trà My	Quảng Nam	
390	Nam Trực	Nam Định	
391	Nam Từ Liêm	Hà Nội	urban district
392	Năm Căn	Cà Mau	
393	Nậm Nhùn	Lai Châu	
394	Nậm Pồ	Điện Biên	
395	Nga Sơn	Thanh Hóa	
396	Ngã Bảy	Hậu Giang	city
397	Ngã Năm	Sóc Trăng	town
398	Ngân Sơn	Bắc Kạn	
399	Nghi Lộc	Nghệ An	
400	Nghi Sơn	Thanh Hoá	town
401	Nghi Xuân	Hà Tĩnh	
402	Nghĩa Đàn	Nghệ An	
403	Nghĩa Hành	Quảng Ngãi	
404	Nghĩa Hưng	Nam Định	
405	Nghĩa Lộ	Yên Bái	town
406	Ngọc Hiển	Cà Mau	
407	Ngọc Hồi	Kon Tum	
408	Ngọc Lặc	Thanh Hóa	
409	Ngô Quyền	Hải Phòng	urban district
410	Ngũ Hành Sơn	Đà Nẵng	urban district
411	Nguyên Bình	Cao Bằng	
412	Nha Trang	Khánh Hòa	city
413	Nhà Bè	Thành phố Hồ Chí Minh	
414	Nho Quan	Ninh Bình	
415	Nhơn Trạch	Đồng Nai	
416	Như Thanh	Thanh Hóa	
417	Như Xuân	Thanh Hóa	
418	Ninh Giang	Hải Dương	
419	Ninh Hải	Ninh Thuận	
420	Ninh Hòa	Khánh Hòa	town
421	Ninh Kiều	Cần Thơ	urban district
422	Ninh Phước	Ninh Thuận	
423	Ninh Sơn	Ninh Thuận	
424	Nông Cống	Thanh Hóa	
425	Núi Thành	Quảng Nam	
426	Ô Môn	Cần Thơ	urban district
427	Pác Nặm	Bắc Kạn	
428	Phan Rang – Tháp Chàm	Ninh Thuận	city
429	Phan Thiết	Bình Thuận	city
430	Phong Điền	Huế	town
431	Phong Điền	Cần Thơ	
432	Phong Thổ	Lai Châu	
433	Phổ Yên	Thái Nguyên	city
434	Phú Bình	Thái Nguyên	
435	Phú Giáo	Bình Dương	
436	Phú Hòa	Phú Yên	
437	Phú Lộc	Huế	
438	Phú Lương	Thái Nguyên	
439	Phú Mỹ	Bà Rịa – Vũng Tàu	town
440	Phú Nhuận	Thành phố Hồ Chí Minh	urban district
441	Phú Ninh	Quảng Nam	
442	Phú Quý	Bình Thuận	
443	Phú Quốc	Kiên Giang	city
444	Phú Riềng	Bình Phước	
445	Phú Tân	An Giang	
446	Phú Tân	Cà Mau	
447	Phú Thiện	Gia Lai	
448	Phú Thọ	Phú Thọ	town
449	Phú Vang	Huế	
450	Phú Xuân	Huế	urban district
451	Phú Xuyên	Hà Nội	
452	Phù Cát	Bình Định	
453	Phù Cừ	Hưng Yên	
454	Phù Mỹ	Bình Định	
455	Phù Ninh	Phú Thọ	
456	Phù Yên	Sơn La	
457	Phủ Lý	Hà Nam	city
458	Phúc Thọ	Hà Nội	
459	Phúc Yên	Vĩnh Phúc	city
460	Phục Hòa	Cao Bằng	
461	Phụng Hiệp	Hậu Giang	
462	Phước Long	Bình Phước	town
463	Phước Long	Bạc Liêu	
464	Phước Sơn	Quảng Nam	
465	Pleiku	Gia Lai	city
466	Quận 1	Thành phố Hồ Chí Minh	urban district
467	Quận 3	Thành phố Hồ Chí Minh	urban district
468	Quận 4	Thành phố Hồ Chí Minh	urban district
469	Quận 5	Thành phố Hồ Chí Minh	urban district
470	Quận 6	Thành phố Hồ Chí Minh	urban district
471	Quận 7	Thành phố Hồ Chí Minh	urban district
472	Quận 8	Thành phố Hồ Chí Minh	urban district
473	Quận 10	Thành phố Hồ Chí Minh	urban district
474	Quận 11	Thành phố Hồ Chí Minh	urban district
475	Quận 12	Thành phố Hồ Chí Minh	urban district
476	Quan Hóa	Thanh Hóa	
477	Quan Sơn	Thanh Hóa	
478	Quản Bạ	Hà Giang	
479	Quang Bình	Hà Giang	
480	Quảng Điền	Huế	
481	Quảng Hoà	Cao Bằng	
482	Quảng Ngãi	Quảng Ngãi	city
483	Quảng Ninh	Quảng Bình	
484	Quảng Trạch	Quảng Bình	
485	Quảng Trị	Quảng Trị	town
486	Quảng Xương	Thanh Hóa	
487	Quảng Yên	Quảng Ninh	town
488	Quế Phong	Nghệ An	
489	Quế Sơn	Quảng Nam	
490	Quế Võ	Bắc Ninh	town
491	Quy Nhơn	Bình Định	city
492	Quốc Oai	Hà Nội	
493	Quỳ Châu	Nghệ An	
494	Quỳ Hợp	Nghệ An	
495	Quỳnh Lưu	Nghệ An	
496	Quỳnh Nhai	Sơn La	
497	Quỳnh Phụ	Thái Bình	
498	Rạch Giá	Kiên Giang	city
499	Sa Đéc	Đồng Tháp	city
500	Sa Pa	Lào Cai	town
501	Sa Thầy	Kon Tum	
502	Sầm Sơn	Thanh Hóa	city
503	Si Ma Cai	Lào Cai	
504	Sìn Hồ	Lai Châu	
505	Sóc Sơn	Hà Nội	
506	Sóc Trăng	Sóc Trăng	city
507	Sông Cầu	Phú Yên	town
508	Sông Công	Thái Nguyên	city
509	Sông Hinh	Phú Yên	
510	Sông Lô	Vĩnh Phúc	
511	Sông Mã	Sơn La	
512	Sốp Cộp	Sơn La	
513	Sơn Động	Bắc Giang	
514	Sơn Dương	Tuyên Quang	
515	Sơn Hà	Quảng Ngãi	
516	Sơn Hòa	Phú Yên	
517	Sơn La	Sơn La	city
518	Sơn Tây	Hà Nội	town
519	Sơn Tây	Quảng Ngãi	
520	Sơn Tịnh	Quảng Ngãi	
521	Sơn Trà	Đà Nẵng	urban district
522	Tam Bình	Vĩnh Long	
523	Tam Dương	Vĩnh Phúc	
524	Tam Đảo	Vĩnh Phúc	
525	Tam Điệp	Ninh Bình	city
526	Tam Đường	Lai Châu	
527	Tam Kỳ	Quảng Nam	city
528	Tam Nông	Đồng Tháp	
529	Tam Nông	Phú Thọ	
530	Tánh Linh	Bình Thuận	
531	Tân An	Long An	city
532	Tân Biên	Tây Ninh	
533	Tân Bình	Thành phố Hồ Chí Minh	urban district
534	Tân Châu	An Giang	town
535	Tân Châu	Tây Ninh	
536	Tân Hiệp	Kiên Giang	
537	Tân Hồng	Đồng Tháp	
538	Tân Hưng	Long An	
539	Tân Kỳ	Nghệ An	
540	Tân Lạc	Hòa Bình	
541	Tân Phú	Đồng Nai	
542	Tân Phú	Thành phố Hồ Chí Minh	urban district
543	Tân Phú Đông	Tiền Giang	
544	Tân Phước	Tiền Giang	
545	Tân Sơn	Phú Thọ	
546	Tân Thạnh	Long An	
547	Tân Trụ	Long An	
548	Tân Uyên	Bình Dương	city
549	Tân Yên	Bắc Giang	
550	Tây Giang	Quảng Nam	
551	Tây Hòa	Phú Yên	
552	Tây Hồ	Hà Nội	urban district
553	Tây Ninh	Tây Ninh	city
554	Tây Sơn	Bình Định	
555	Thạch An	Cao Bằng	
556	Thạch Hà	Hà Tĩnh	
557	Thạch Thành	Thanh Hóa	
558	Thạch Thất	Hà Nội	
559	Thái Bình	Thái Bình	city
560	Thái Hoà	Nghệ An	town
561	Thái Nguyên	Thái Nguyên	city
562	Thái Thụy	Thái Bình	
563	Than Uyên	Lai Châu	
564	Thanh Ba	Phú Thọ	
565	Thanh Bình	Đồng Tháp	
566	Thanh Chương	Nghệ An	
567	Thanh Hà	Hải Dương	
568	Thanh Hóa	Thanh Hóa	city
569	Thanh Khê	Đà Nẵng	urban district
570	Thanh Liêm	Hà Nam	
571	Thanh Miện	Hải Dương	
572	Thanh Oai	Hà Nội	
573	Thanh Sơn	Phú Thọ	
574	Thanh Thủy	Phú Thọ	
575	Thanh Trì	Hà Nội	
576	Thanh Xuân	Hà Nội	urban district
577	Thạnh Hóa	Long An	
578	Thạnh Phú	Bến Tre	
579	Thạnh Trị	Sóc Trăng	
580	Tháp Mười	Đồng Tháp	
581	Thăng Bình	Quảng Nam	
582	Thiệu Hóa	Thanh Hóa	
583	Thọ Xuân	Thanh Hóa	
584	Thoại Sơn	An Giang	
585	Thống Nhất	Đồng Nai	
586	Thốt Nốt	Cần Thơ	urban district
587	Thới Bình	Cà Mau	
588	Thới Lai	Cần Thơ	
589	Thủ Dầu Một	Bình Dương	town
590	Thủ Đức	Thành phố Hồ Chí Minh	municipal city
591	Thủ Thừa	Long An	
592	Thuận An	Bình Dương	city
593	Thuận Bắc	Ninh Thuận	
594	Thuận Châu	Sơn La	
595	Thuận Hóa	Huế	urban district
596	Thuận Nam	Ninh Thuận	
597	Thuận Thành	Bắc Ninh	town
598	Thủy Nguyên	Hải Phòng	municipal city
599	Thường Tín	Hà Nội	
600	Thường Xuân	Thanh Hóa	
601	Tiên Du	Bắc Ninh	
602	Tiền Hải	Thái Bình	
603	Tiên Lãng	Hải Phòng	
604	Tiên Lữ	Hưng Yên	
605	Tiên Phước	Quảng Nam	
606	Tiên Yên	Quảng Ninh	
607	Tiểu Cần	Trà Vinh	
608	Tịnh Biên	An Giang	town
609	Trà Bồng	Quảng Ngãi	
610	Trà Cú	Trà Vinh	
611	Trà Ôn	Vĩnh Long	
612	Trà Vinh	Trà Vinh	city
613	Trạm Tấu	Yên Bái	
614	Tràng Định	Lạng Sơn	
615	Trảng Bàng	Tây Ninh	town
616	Trảng Bom	Đồng Nai	
617	Trấn Yên	Yên Bái	
618	Trần Đề	Sóc Trăng	
619	Trần Văn Thời	Cà Mau	
620	Tri Tôn	An Giang	
621	Triệu Phong	Quảng Trị	
622	Triệu Sơn	Thanh Hóa	
623	Trùng Khánh	Cao Bằng	
624	Trực Ninh	Nam Định	
625	Trường Sa	Khánh Hòa	
626	Tủa Chùa	Điện Biên	
627	Tuần Giáo	Điện Biên	
628	Tu Mơ Rông	Kon Tum	
629	Tuy An	Phú Yên	
630	Tuy Đức	Đắk Nông	
631	Tuy Hòa	Phú Yên	city
632	Tuy Phong	Bình Thuận	
633	Tuy Phước	Bình Định	
634	Tuyên Hóa	Quảng Bình	
635	Tuyên Quang	Tuyên Quang	city
636	Tư Nghĩa	Quảng Ngãi	
637	Tứ Kỳ	Hải Dương	
638	Từ Sơn	Bắc Ninh	city
639	Tương Dương	Nghệ An	
640	U Minh	Cà Mau	
641	U Minh Thượng	Kiên Giang	
642	Uông Bí	Quảng Ninh	city
643	Ứng Hòa	Hà Nội	
644	Vạn Ninh	Khánh Hòa	
645	Văn Bàn	Lào Cai	
646	Văn Chấn	Yên Bái	
647	Văn Giang	Hưng Yên	
648	Vãn Lãng	Lạng Sơn	
649	Văn Lâm	Hưng Yên	
650	Văn Quan	Lạng Sơn	
651	Văn Yên	Yên Bái	
652	Vân Canh	Bình Định	
653	Vân Đồn	Quảng Ninh	
654	Vân Hồ	Sơn La	
655	Vị Thanh	Hậu Giang	city
656	Vị Thủy	Hậu Giang	
657	Vị Xuyên	Hà Giang	
658	Việt Trì	Phú Thọ	city
659	Việt Yên	Bắc Giang	town
660	Vinh	Nghệ An	city
661	Vĩnh Bảo	Hải Phòng	
662	Vĩnh Châu	Sóc Trăng	
663	Vĩnh Cửu	Đồng Nai	
664	Vĩnh Hưng	Long An	
665	Vĩnh Linh	Quảng Trị	
666	Vĩnh Long	Vĩnh Long	city
667	Vĩnh Lộc	Thanh Hóa	
668	Vĩnh Lợi	Bạc Liêu	
669	Vĩnh Thạnh	Bình Định	
670	Vĩnh Thạnh	Cần Thơ	
671	Vĩnh Thuận	Kiên Giang	
672	Vĩnh Tường	Vĩnh Phúc	
673	Vĩnh Yên	Vĩnh Phúc	city
674	Võ Nhai	Thái Nguyên	
675	Vũ Quang	Hà Tĩnh	
676	Vũ Thư	Thái Bình	
677	Vụ Bản	Nam Định	
678	Vũng Liêm	Vĩnh Long	
679	Vũng Tàu	Bà Rịa – Vũng Tàu	city
680	Xín Mần	Hà Giang	
681	Xuân Lộc	Đồng Nai	
682	Xuân Trường	Nam Định	
683	Xuyên Mộc	Bà Rịa – Vũng Tàu	
684	Ý Yên	Nam Định	
685	Yên Bái	Yên Bái	city
686	Yên Bình	Yên Bái	
687	Yên Châu	Sơn La	
688	Yên Định	Thanh Hóa	
689	Yên Khánh	Ninh Bình	
690	Yên Lạc	Vĩnh Phúc	
691	Yên Lập	Phú Thọ	
692	Yên Minh	Hà Giang	
693	Yên Mô	Ninh Bình	
694	Yên Mỹ	Hưng Yên	
695	Yên Phong	Bắc Ninh	
696	Yên Sơn	Tuyên Quang	
697	Yên Thành	Nghệ An	
698	Yên Thế	Bắc Giang	
699	Yên Thủy	Hòa Bình	
