= Chợ Lớn province =

Historic province of Vietnam

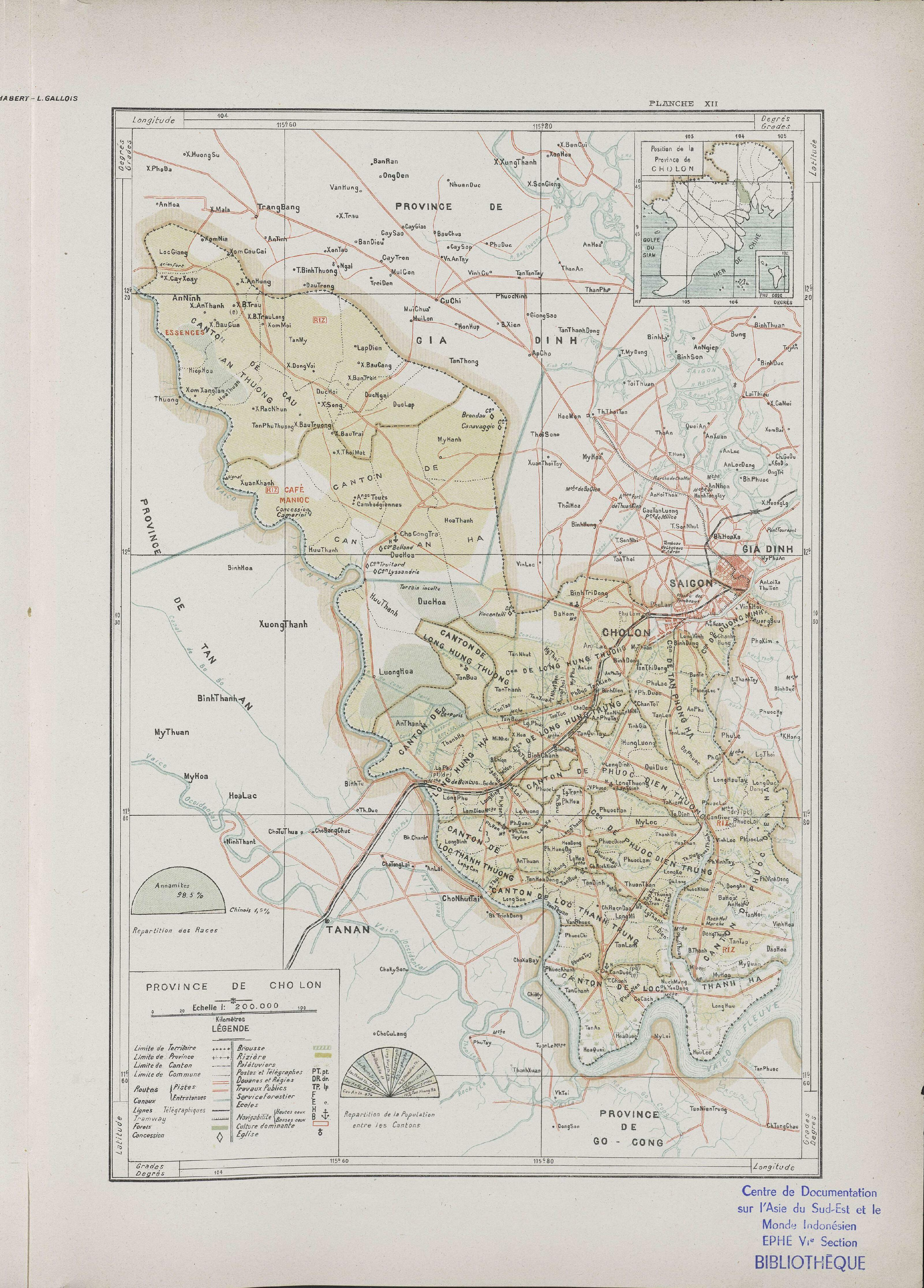
Map of Cho Lon province in 1909

Chợ Lớn was former province of South Vietnam. It was established in December 1899 when Gia Định province was split to four smaller provinces. In 1901 its population was 184,151, 1916 census was 212,536, and February 15, 1920, census was 205,657. In 1950, the province's population was approximately 1 million, and more than half of whom were Chinese immigrants.

In 1940 it had 4 districts: Đức Hòa, Cần Giuộc, Cần Đước and Trung Quận. On June 27, 1951, it was merged with Bà Rịa province to form Chợ Lớn-Bà Rịa province.

Later Cần Giuộc, Bến Lức and Đức Hòa districts were merged to Long An province. Bình Chánh District (formerly known as Trung Quận) was merged to Gia Định province and lately was belong to Saigon.
