= Operation Enterprise (Vietnam War) =

Part of the Vietnam War (1967–1968)

- Part of the Vietnam War
Date	13 February 1967 – 11 March 1968
Location	Long An Province, South Vietnam

Belligerents
United States; South Vietnam	North Vietnam; Viet Cong

Commanders and leaders
Col. George W. Everett	

Units involved
(United States) 3rd Brigade, 9th Infantry Division (South Vietnam) Regional Forces and Popular Forces	

Casualties and losses
(United States) 31 killed	284 killed 58 captured 115 defected 65 individual and 14 crew-served weapons recovered

Operation Enterprise was a U.S. Army pacification and security operation that took place in Long An Province, lasting from 13 February 1967 to 11 March 1968.

== Background ==
The 3rd Brigade, 9th Infantry Division was responsible for the security of Long An Province, southwest of Saigon. Long An Province was the gateway to the Mekong Delta the "rice-basket" of South Vietnam, in addition to producing over 280,000 tons of rice per year itself. The province contained vital transport links namely Route 4 which connected Saigon to An Xuyên Province and the Vàm Cỏ Đông and Vàm Cỏ Tay rivers which flowed southeast from the Parrot's Beak, Cambodia to the Saigon River.

The Vàm Cỏ Đông and Vàm Cỏ Tay rivers also served as vital supply lines for the People's Army of Vietnam (PAVN) and Viet Cong (VC) linking their sanctuaries in Cambodia with their operational areas around Saigon and in the Mekong Delta. Long An Province was believed to shelter the 267th, 269th, and 6th Bình Tân Battalions in the west and the 506th, 508th, 5th Nhà Bè and Phu Loi II Battalions in the east. The VC had successfully established control over most of the province with the result that South Vietnamese Government control was limited to the major towns and outposts along Route 4. At the commencement of the operation in February 1967 the South Vietnamese Government controlled less than a quarter of the population and only 4 percent of the province was considered physically secure.

The ambitious objectives of Operation Enterprise were "to achieve military pacification by destroying the enemy; eliminating his infrastructure; denying him use of lines of communications; and extending government of Vietnam control through the support of Revolutionary Development.”

== Operation ==
The 3rd Brigade kept its headquarters at Tân An the provincial capital, 47 km southwest of Saigon on Route 4 and the Vàm Cỏ Tay river. The 2nd Battalion, 60th Infantry Regiment operated from Tân Trụ, 7 km east of Tân An and was responsible for patrolling the Vàm Cỏ Đông river using Boston Whaler boats. The 3rd Battalion, 39th Infantry Regiment, was based at Rach Kien with one company in the town of Cần Giuộc and another company 15 km southeast of Rach Kien, where the Vàm Cỏ Đông merged with the Saigon River. Highway 5A passed through Cần Giuộc District, connecting Saigon with Gò Công Province. The 5th Battalion, 60th Infantry Regiment (Mechanized), was based in Bình Phước 10 km southeast of Tan An and was responsible for patrolling Highway 4 between Saigon and Đồng Tâm Base Camp and protecting the daily supply convoys between Long Binh Post and Tân An.

The Army of the Republic of Vietnam (ARVN) 25th Division kept 2 regiments in Long An Province: the 46th Regiment was based in Cần Giuộc and the 50th Regiment was based in Bến Lức, 12 km northeast of Tân An. In addition the ARVN maintained various Regional and Popular Forces throughout the province.

In order to maximize coverage of the province, the 3rd Brigade used “jitterbug” missions, landing several companies from the 3/39th Infantry and 2/60th Infantry by helicopter for short searches of tree lines or canals and then redeploying to another location if no PAVN/VC were located. Night ambushes were also regularly placed along likely infiltration routes and staging areas. More than 30 percent of all operations were combined operations with ARVN forces. By September 1967 the 3rd Brigade's tactics had forced the PAVN/VC to operate in smaller units along the eastern and western borders of the province.

In October 1967 Civil Operations and Revolutionary Development Support embarked on a new pacification programme to secure Route 4 while at the same time Central Office for South Vietnam ordered a renewed effort to close Route 4. Between 24 and 27 October, PAVN/VC forces used explosives and shovels to crater Route 4 in almost fifty places between Mỹ Tho and Saigon, however this only succeeded in closing the road for a few hours. In late October 5/60th Infantry (Mechanized) patrols succeeded in killing several PAVN/VC mine-laying teams and by early November interdiction of the road had dropped back to normal levels. Meanwhile, the South Vietnamese government had established a Revolutionary Development zone along the northeastern edge of Long An linking the government-controlled hamlets that lined Highways 4 and 5A creating a security barrier on the southern approach to Gia Định Province and Saigon.

On the night of 10 December, the VC 508th Battalion and elements of the 5th Nhà Bè Battalion attacked a Company A, 2/60th Infantry position at An Nhut Tan, on the Vàm Cỏ Đông River. The VC overran three perimeter bunkers as well as the mortar pit. The attack was eventually repulsed for the loss of 7 U.S. killed and 35 VC killed. A subsequent investigation found that the perimeter defenses were inadequate with the Concertina wire too loose and rusty and many of the trip flares and claymore mines deteriorated and inoperative and that several of the sentries had been asleep. Other than this attack, most of the action in the province during November and December was limited to small skirmishes and attacks by fire.

In addition to offensive operations the 3rd Brigade also conducted training and numerous civic actions to support pacification. Between 1 November 1967 and 30 January 1968, brigade medics treated 44,394 civilians and taught first aid to Vietnamese assigned to village dispensaries. A 7-man team taught a six-week refresher course to an ARVN battalion, while three Mobile Advisory Teams trained Regional and Popular Forces and several Improvement Action Teams made weekly visits to Regional and Popular Force outposts.

== Aftermath ==
Between 1 November 1967 and 30 January 1968, the 3rd Brigade killed 241 PAVN/VC, captured 21 PAVN/VC and received 80 defectors and captured 14 crew-served weapons and 65 rifles for the loss of 31 U.S. dead. During the same period, provincial officials reported killing 43 PAVN/VC, capturing 37 and receiving 35 defectors.

On 10 March 1968 II Field Force, Vietnam commander LG Frederick C. Weyand ordered an end to Operation Enterprise to free up forces to participate in Operation Quyet Thang.
