= Đức Huệ district =

Coordinates: 10°54′N 106°12′E

Đức Huệ district Huyện Đức Huệ
- District
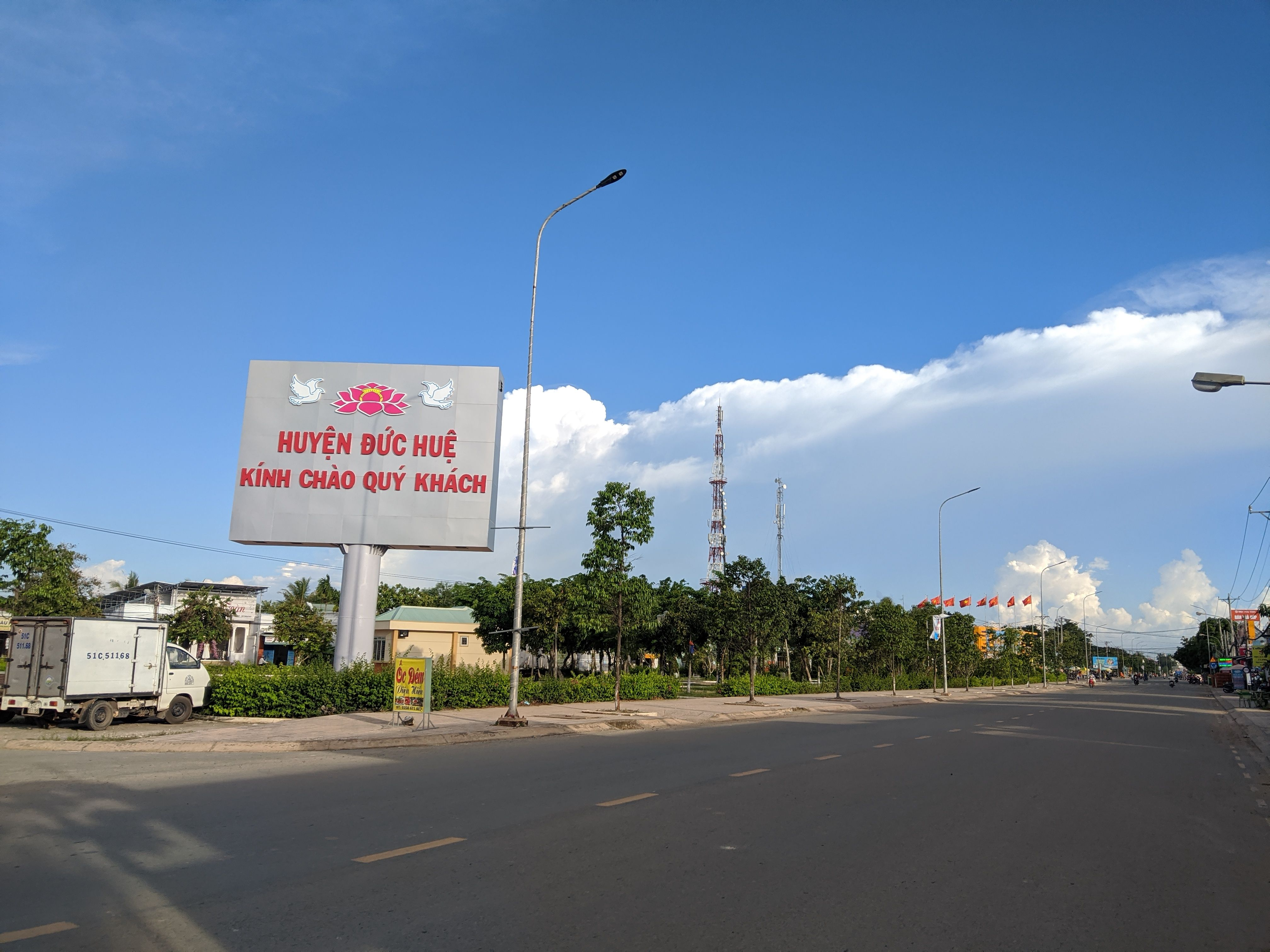
- A corner of Đông Thành town

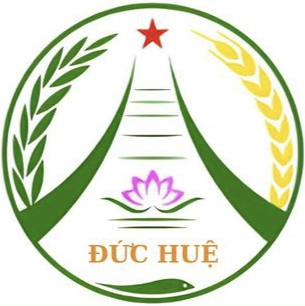
- Seal
- Country: Vietnam
- Region: Mekong Delta
- Province: Long An
- Capital: Đông Thành

Area
  - Total: 165 sq mi (428 km^{2})

Population (2018)
  - Total: 79,079
- Time zone: UTC+07:00 (Indochina Time)

Đức Huệ is a former rural district of Long An province in the Mekong Delta region of Vietnam. It has a western border with Cambodia; a southwest border with Thạnh Hóa district; an eastern border with Đức Hòa district; and a south and southeast border with Thủ Thừa district and Bến Lức district. As of 2003 the district had a population of 61,620. The district covers an area of 428 km^{2}. The district capital lies at Đông Thành.

Đức Huệ district was established under Decree No. 48-NV of the Republic of Vietnam on March 3, 1959.

== Divisions ==
The district is divided into 10 communes:

Mỹ Thạnh Đông, Mỹ Quý Đông, Mỹ Quý Tây, Mỹ Thạnh Tây, Bình Thành, Mỹ Thạnh Bắc, Bình Hoà Bắc, Bình Hoà Nam, Bình Hoà Hưng and Mỹ Bình.
