= Trần Phước Thọ =

Vietnamese footballer

Personal information
- Full name: Trần Phước Thọ
- Date of birth: 5 March 1993
- Place of birth: Châu Thành, Long An, Vietnam
- Date of death: 17 April 2016 (aged 23)
- Place of death: Tân An, Long An, Vietnam
- Height: 1.71 m (5 ft 7 in)
- Position: Defender

Youth career
- 2005–2012: Đồng Tâm Long An

Senior career*
Years	Team	Apps	(Gls)
2013–2016	Đồng Tâm Long An	16	(0)

International career
2015–2016	Vietnam U23	1	(0)
- * Club domestic league appearances and goals

Trần Phước Thọ (5 March 1993 – 17 April 2016) was a Vietnamese footballer who last played as a defender for the V-League club Đồng Tâm Long An He was a former member of the Vietnam national under-23 football team.

He died on 17 April 2016 due to a motorcycle accident. He was 23 years old.
