= Battle of Ap Da Bien =

Part of the Vietnam War (1973)

- Part of the Vietnam War
| Date | 3 October 1973 |
| Location | Ap Da Bien, Thanh Phuoc Commune, Thạnh Hóa District, Long An, Vietnam |
| Result | South Vietnamese victory |

Belligerents
| North Vietnam | South Vietnam |

Strength
| 1 regiment | Unknown |

Casualties and losses
| ~200 killed | Unknown |

The Battle of Ap Da Bien took place during the Vietnam War, at dawn on 3 October 1973 when the 207th Regiment of the People's Army of Vietnam (PAVN) was raided by forces of the Army of the Republic of Vietnam while sheltering near the hamlet of Ap Da Bien in Thạnh Hóa District, Long An Province. The battle resulted in the death of over 200 soldiers of the PAVN 207th Regiment, of whom most were ex-students of the Hanoi University of Civil Engineering.

In 1991, a shrine called "Miếu Bắc Bỏ" (meaning "shrine of those who leave the North") has been built by the locals of Ap Da Bien to honor the NVA soldiers who were killed in this battle.
