= Kiến Tường (town) =

- District-level town (Class-4)
- Kiến Tường Town; Thị xã Kiến Tường
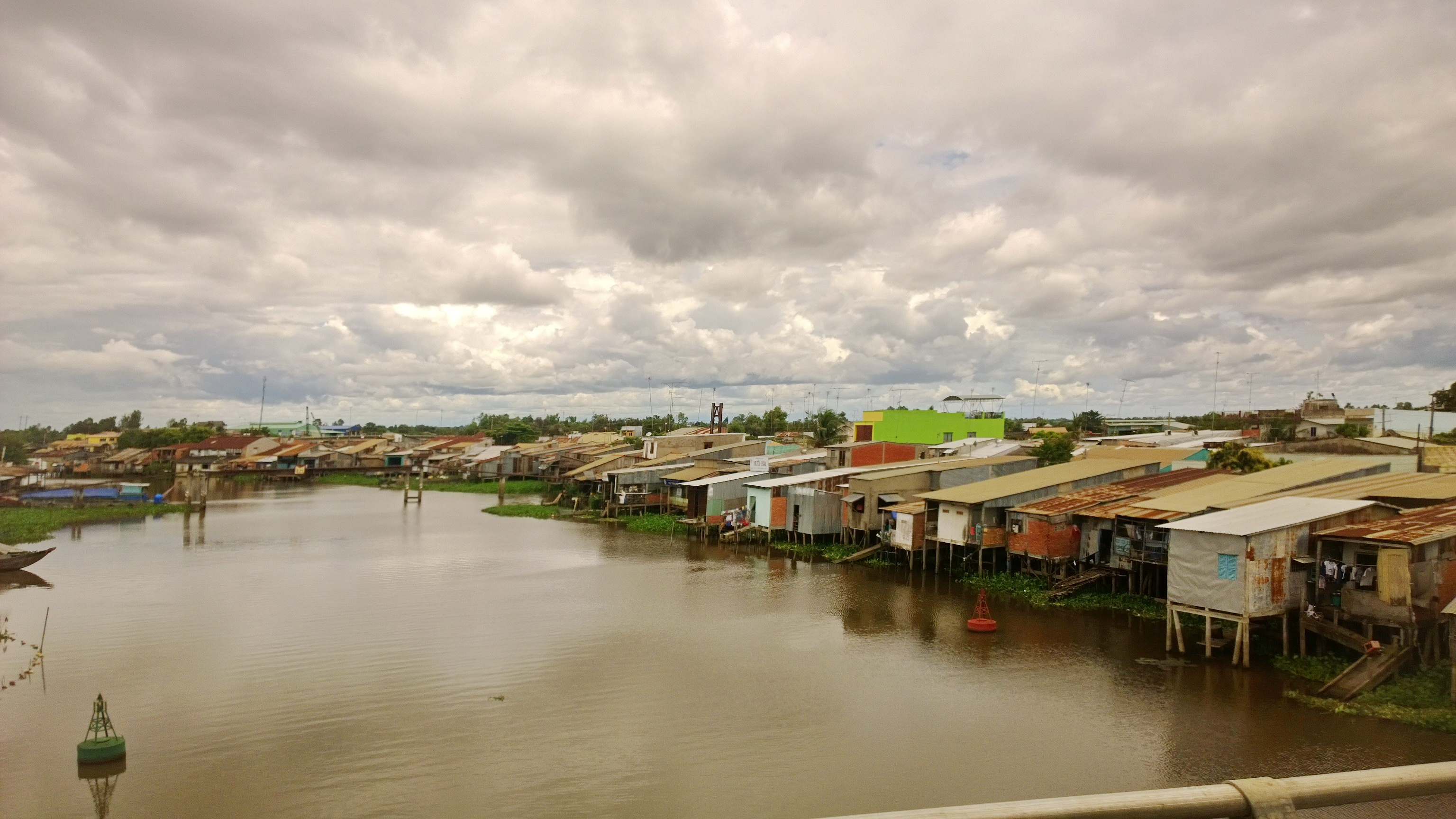
- Interactive map of Kiến Tường
- Location within Vietnam Location within Southeast Asia Location within Asia
- Coordinates: 10.78°N 105.94°E
- Country: Vietnam
- Province: Long An
- Created: 18 March 2013

Government
  - People's Council Chair: Đỗ Văn Thiệt
  - People's Committee Chair: Nguyễn Văn Vũ

Area
  - District-level town (Class-4): 204.28 km^{2} (78.87 sq mi)
  - Urban: 25.4876 km^{2} (9.8408 sq mi)

Population
  - Estimate (2013): 64,589
  - Density: 316/km^{2} (820/sq mi)
  - Urban: 40,991
  - Urban density: 1,608/km^{2} (4,160/sq mi)
- Time zone: UTC+7 (Indochina Time)
- Website: Official website

Kiến Tường is a former district-level town in Long An province, Vietnam. The administrative area is centered around Mộc Hóa town. Its population in 2013 was reported to be 64,589.

== Geography ==
Kiến Tường is located about 80 kilometres (50 mi) west of Ho Chi Minh City, on the Vàm Cỏ Tây River in the heart of the Đồng Tháp Mười wetland. It covers an area of 204.28 square kilometres (78.87 sq mi), and borders the districts of Mộc Hóa to the east, Tân Thạnh to the south, Tân Hưng to the west and Vĩnh Hưng to the northwest. To its north is Kampong Rou District of Svay Rieng Province in Cambodia.

== Climate ==
Climate data for Kiến Tường (Mộc Hóa)
Month	Jan	Feb	Mar	Apr	May	Jun	Jul	Aug	Sep	Oct	Nov	Dec	Year
Record high °C (°F)	34.8 (94.6)	35.8 (96.4)	37.2 (99.0)	38.2 (100.8)	38.6 (101.5)	37.0 (98.6)	35.4 (95.7)	35.0 (95.0)	34.3 (93.7)	33.5 (92.3)	33.5 (92.3)	33.7 (92.7)	38.6 (101.5)
Mean daily maximum °C (°F)	31.4 (88.5)	32.4 (90.3)	33.9 (93.0)	34.9 (94.8)	33.9 (93.0)	32.6 (90.7)	32.1 (89.8)	31.6 (88.9)	31.2 (88.2)	30.8 (87.4)	30.8 (87.4)	30.6 (87.1)	32.2 (90.0)
Daily mean °C (°F)	25.9 (78.6)	26.3 (79.3)	27.5 (81.5)	28.7 (83.7)	28.5 (83.3)	27.7 (81.9)	27.3 (81.1)	27.5 (81.5)	27.8 (82.0)	27.6 (81.7)	27.2 (81.0)	26.1 (79.0)	27.3 (81.1)
Mean daily minimum °C (°F)	22.2 (72.0)	22.4 (72.3)	23.4 (74.1)	24.8 (76.6)	25.3 (77.5)	24.9 (76.8)	24.5 (76.1)	24.9 (76.8)	25.2 (77.4)	25.2 (77.4)	24.4 (75.9)	22.5 (72.5)	24.1 (75.4)
Record low °C (°F)	16.4 (61.5)	18.0 (64.4)	16.2 (61.2)	22.3 (72.1)	21.7 (71.1)	21.9 (71.4)	21.3 (70.3)	21.6 (70.9)	22.1 (71.8)	21.3 (70.3)	18.7 (65.7)	15.7 (60.3)	15.7 (60.3)
Average precipitation mm (inches)	14 (0.6)	7 (0.3)	13 (0.5)	60 (2.4)	185 (7.3)	165 (6.5)	180 (7.1)	173 (6.8)	253 (10.0)	317 (12.5)	152 (6.0)	40 (1.6)	1,557 (61.3)
Average precipitation days	2.4	1.0	2.2	6.8	16.3	16.9	19.7	18.1	20.4	21.1	12.8	5.0	142.6
Average relative humidity (%)	76.8	77.0	76.3	76.5	82.0	84.6	85.0	84.6	83.8	82.4	79.2	76.7	80.4
Mean monthly sunshine hours	266	251	279	247	225	184	195	186	186	200	226	240	2,686
Source: Vietnam Institute for Building Science and Technology

== History ==
The town of Kiến Tường was originally known as Mộc Hóa, and the general area has been continuously inhabited since the 18th century. On 22 October 1956, the government of South Vietnam established the province of Kiến Tường with Mộc Hóa as its capital. After the Fall of Saigon, this province was incorporated into Long An Province in 1976. The town of Mộc Hóa and surrounding areas were split from the rest of Mộc Hóa District in 2013 to create the current district-level town of Kiến Tường.

== Administration ==
Kiến Tường is divided into three wards numbered 1 through 3, and five rural communes: Bình Hiệp, Bình Tân, Thạnh Hưng, Thạnh Trị and Tuyên Thạnh. The People's Council Chair of the town is Đỗ Văn Thiệt and the People's Committee Chair is Nguyễn Văn Vũ.

== Economy ==
Kiến Tường is planned to become the economic centre of the Đồng Tháp Mười region. Agriculture is currently the main economic activity, accounting for 70% of employment in the administrative district. Fishing and traditional handicrafts also form part of the local economy.

== Infrastructure ==
National Route 62 enters the district from the southeast, connecting Tân Thạnh District with the town of Kiến Tường. From there it turns north and ends at the Bình Hiệp border crossing to Cambodia.

== Education ==
Vocational Long An college - Kien Tuong Campus - is the only college operating in the town. It provides career training programs for local students and nearby towns in Dong Thap Muoi region.

Brief history of development of Long An Vocational College:

The predecessor of Long An Vocational College was Long An Vocational College. On January 9, 2007, Long An Provincial People's Committee signed Decision No. 76/QD- People's Committee on upgrading Long An Thanh Vocational School to Long An Vocational College. On October 16, 2009, the Minister of Labor, War Invalids and Social Affairs signed Decision No. 1308/QD- LDTBXH to establish Long An Vocational College on the basis of upgrading from Long An Vocational School.

Long An Vocational College is the only public school in Long An Province. Currently, the school has 3 campuses:

+ Facility 01: Located at No. 60 National Highway 1, Ward 05, Tan An City, Long An Province (500m from Tan An Bridge towards Ho Chi Minh City) with an area of 4.7 ha.

+ Facility 02: Located in Huong Tho Phu commune, Tan An city, Long An province with an area of 2.4 hectares.

+ Facility 03: Located in Kien Tuong Town, Long An province with an area of 2.4 hectares.
