= Tân An (city) =

Former provincial city and capital of the former Long An province, Vietnam

Coordinates: 10°32′00″N 106°25′00″E

- Provincial city
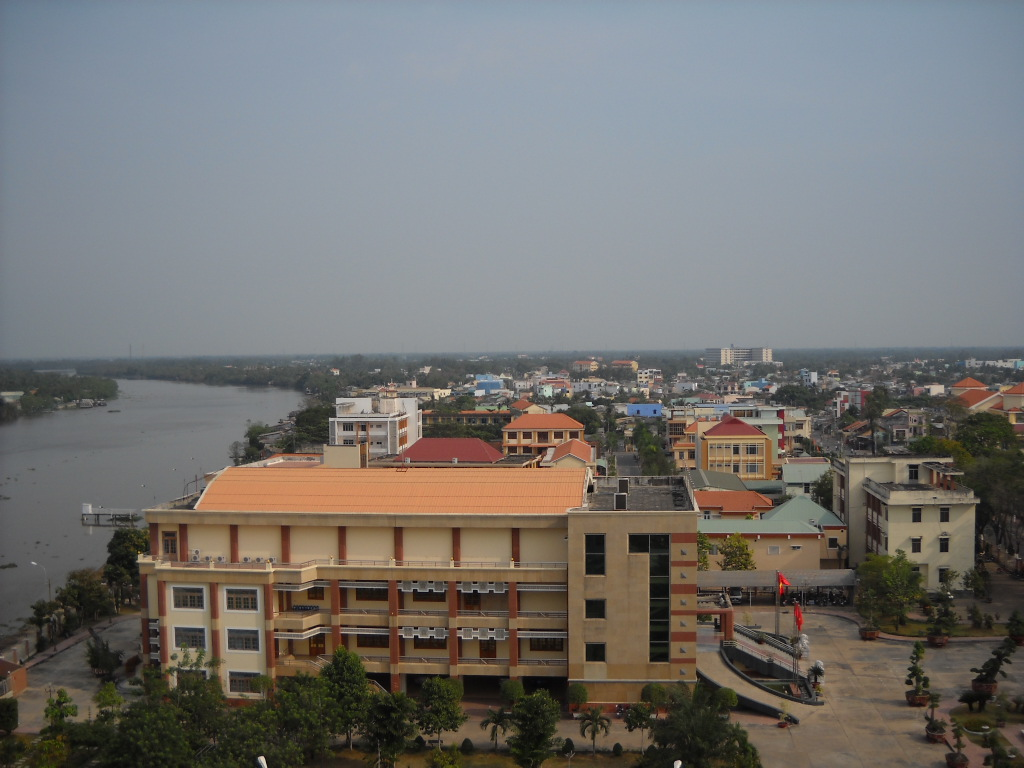
- /0/queryThe property query is required; /0/idsThe property ids is required; /0Failed to match at least one schema; /0/titleThe property title is required; /0/serviceDoes not have a value in the enumeration ["page"]; /0Failed to match exactly one schema; /0/geometriesThe property geometries is required; /0/typeDoes not have a value in the enumeration ["GeometryCollection"]; /0/typeDoes not have a value in the enumeration ["MultiPolygon"]; /0/typeDoes not have a value in the enumeration ["Point"]; /0/typeDoes not have a value in the enumeration ["MultiPoint"]; /0/typeDoes not have a value in the enumeration ["LineString"]; /0/typeDoes not have a value in the enumeration ["MultiLineString"]; /0/typeDoes not have a value in the enumeration ["Polygon"]; /0/coordinatesThe property coordinates is required; /0/geometryThe property geometry is required; /0/typeDoes not have a value in the enumeration ["Feature"]; /0/featuresThe property features is required; /0/typeDoes not have a value in the enumeration ["FeatureCollection"]
- Country: Vietnam
- Region: Mekong Delta
- Province: Long An
- Dissolution: July 1, 2025

Government
  - Type: Provincial city

Area
  - Total: 81.94 km^{2} (31.64 sq mi)

Population (2018)
  - Total: 215,250
  - Density: 2,277.4/km^{2} (5,898/sq mi)

Tân An is a former provincial city and capital of the former Long An province in Mekong Delta region of Vietnam. It was upgraded from town status to city status on 26 August 2009. The population of Tân An is 165,214 as of 2009, with an area of 81.79 km^{2}.

Tân An is in the south-west of Ho Chi Minh City, 47 km away from the city centre and bordered to the north by Thủ Thừa district, to the east by Tân Trụ district and Châu Thành district and to the west and south-west by Tiền Giang province. Ward 1 is the economic, political and cultural center of the city.

Tân An is the political, cultural, economic, scientific and technological center of Long An province. The township is in the development of the Southern Key Economic Region, and the economic gateway to the provinces of the Mekong River Delta, with the main river and road traffic, National Highway 1A, National Highway 62 and Vàm Cỏ Tây river, flowing through the center.

== History ==
=== Before 1945 ===
Management of rivers in the Mekong Delta began to develop the area in 1705, bringing commerce to the Vàm Cỏ Tay River at Tân An (then written: 新安) as the end of the Bảo Định Canal in the first years of the Nguyễn dynasty around 1802. In 1800, the entire Mekong Delta fell under the Nguyễn dynasty's authority. Tân An and its immediate surroundings used to be its own province, established by the French colonists in December 1889, when Gia Định Province was split into four smaller provinces. In October 1956, Tân An Province was merged into Long An Province by the Republic of Vietnam government under President Ngô Đình Diệm.

=== 1945 ===
Following the August Revolution in Hanoi the local communists seized power in the south in Tân An on 21 August 1945.

=== Vietnam War ===
Tân An was the headquarters of the 3rd Brigade, 9th Infantry Division (United States) during the Vietnam War. The 9th Infantry Division was the southernmost infantry division in the Delta. The 3rd Brigade Headquarters, 9th Division was based in one part of town and Tân An air base was on the other side of town that supported 9th Infantry helicopters and could land medium-sized prop planes. The base camp at Tân An was turned over to the South Vietnamese Army when the 9th division left in 1970. The 9th Division was the first infantry division to leave.
