= Vàm Cỏ =

- Commune
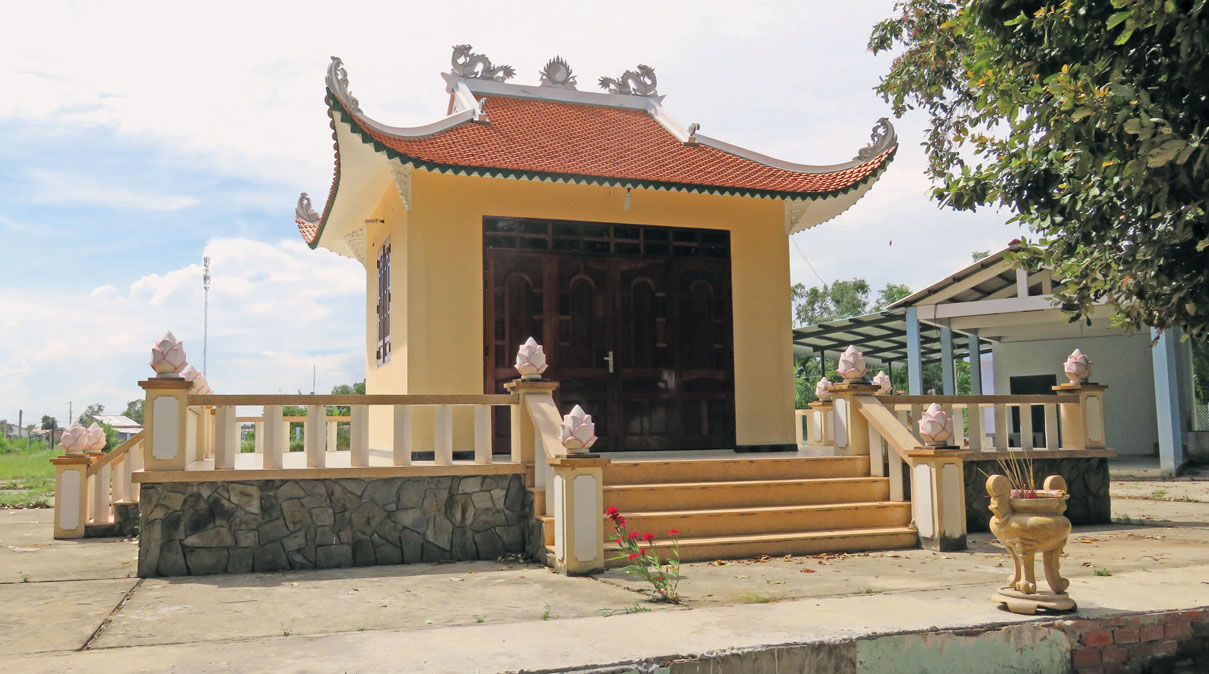
- Miễu Ông Bần Quỳ
- Interactive map of Vàm Cỏ
- Coordinates: 10.535836502771343°N 106.54112520446948°E
- Country: Vietnam
- Province: Tây Ninh
- Region: Southeast
- Established: 16 June 2025

Area
  - Total: 40.73 km^{2} (15.73 sq mi)

Population (31 December 2024)
  - Total: 25,354
  - Density: 622/km^{2} (1,610/sq mi)
- Website: vamco.tayninh.gov.vn

Vàm Cỏ is a commune in Tây Ninh province, Vietnam.

On 12 June 2025, the National Assembly of Vietnam adopted Resolution No. 202/2025/QH15 on the reorganization of provincial-level administrative units. Under the resolution, the entire area and population of Long An province and Tây Ninh province were reorganized into a new province named Tây Ninh.

On 16 June 2025, the Standing Committee of the National Assembly of Vietnam adopted Resolution No. 1682/NQ-UBTVQH15 on the reorganization of commune-level administrative units in Tây Ninh province in 2025. Under the resolution, the entire area and population of Tân Phước Tây, Nhựt Ninh, and Đức Tân communes in the former Tân Trụ district were consolidated to form a new commune named Vàm Cỏ.
