= Kiến Tường =

- Ward
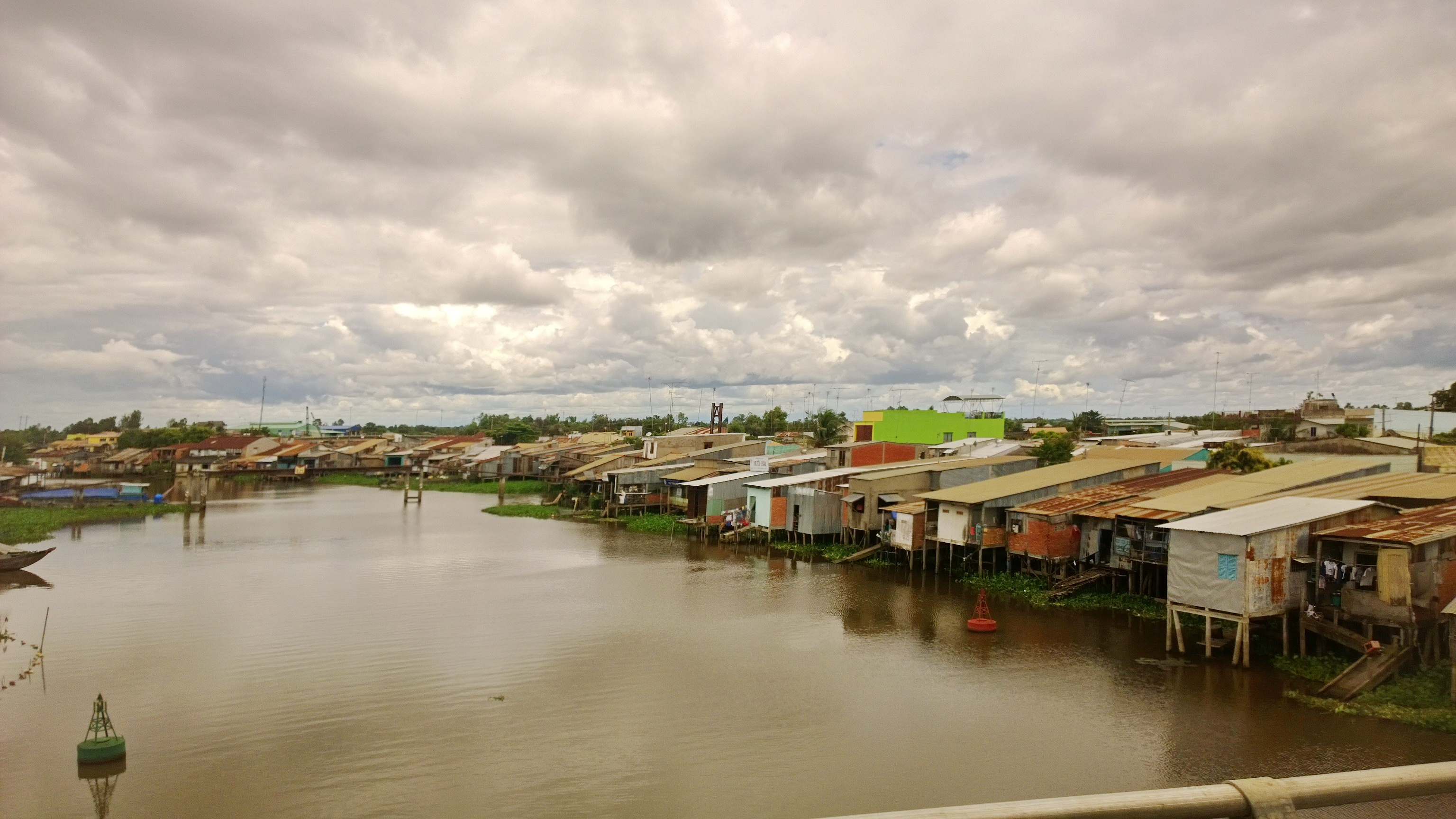
- Cá Rô canal in Kiến Tường ward.
- Country: Vietnam
- Province: Tây Ninh
- Establish: June 16, 2025
- Headquarters of the People's Committee: 12, 30/4 street, Kiến Tường ward

Area
  - Total: 26.28 km^{2} (10.15 sq mi)

Population
  - Total: 23,738 people
  - Density: 903.3/km^{2} (2,339/sq mi)
- Time zone: UTC+07:00

Kiến Tường is a ward in Tây Ninh province, Vietnam. It is one of 96 communes and wards in the province after the 2025 reorganization.

== Geography ==
Kiến Tường is a ward of Tây Ninh province in Southeast region, Vietnam. It is considered the heart of the Đồng Tháp Mười region. The ward has the following geographical location:

- To the north, it borders Bình Hiệp commune.
- To the east, it borders Bình Hòa commune.
- To the southeast, it borders Mộc Hóa commune.
- To the southwest and west, it borders Tuyên Thạnh commune.

== History ==
Prior to 2025, Kiến Tường ward consisted of ward 1, ward 2, and ward 3 of Kiến Tường district-level town, Long An province.

On June 12, 2025, the National Assembly of Vietnam issued Resolution No. 202/2025/QH15 on the reorganization of provincial-level administrative units. Accordingly:

- Tây Ninh province was established by merging the entire area and population of Long An province and Tây Ninh province.
- After the merger, Tây Ninh province has an area of 8,536.44 km^{2} and a population of 3,254,170 people, with a population density of 381 people/km^{2}.

On June 16, 2025, the Standing Committee of the National Assembly of Vietnam issued Resolution No. 1682/NQ-UBTVQH15 on the reorganization of commune-level administrative units in Tây Ninh province. Accordingly:

- Kiến Tường ward was established by merging the entire area and population of ward 1, ward 2, and ward 3 (before belonging to the former Kiến Tường district-level town; excerpt from Clause 83, Article 1).
