= Nàng Thơm Chợ Đào rice =

Traditional rice variety grown in Vietnam

Nàng Thơm Chợ Đào Rice is a traditional rice variety grown in Vietnam. It is grown in Mỹ Lệ commune, Cần Đước district, in the southern province of Long An, Vietnam. People personify this rice as a "fragrant girl" and called it Nàng Thơm. This rice was historically bought and sold primarily in Đào market- chợ Đào, which is why the rice is named Nàng Thơm Chợ Đào.

== History ==
Since 19th century, under the reign of emperor Minh Mạng, Nàng Thơm Chợ Đào was the primary product used as an offering to the emperor.
