= Tân An province =

Historic province of Vietnam

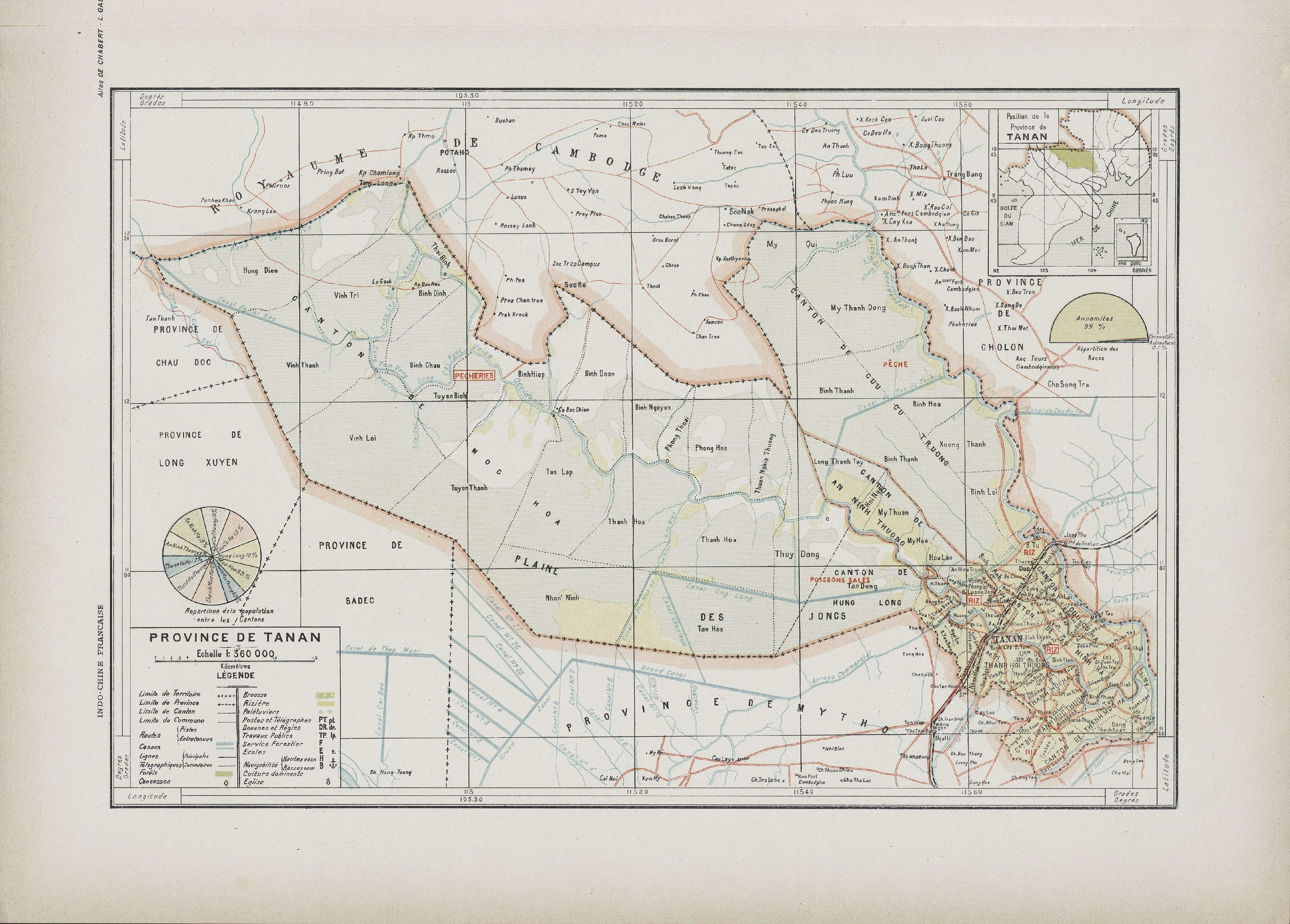
Map of Tan An province in 1909

Tân An is a former province of South Vietnam. It was established in December 1889 when Gia Định province was split to four smaller provinces. On 20 March 1951, parts of Tân An and Mỹ Tho were merged into Đồng Tháp Mười province. In October 1956, Tân An was merged with Chợ Lớn province (except Trung Quận district, which is Bình Chánh nowadays) to establish Long An province.
