= Đức Hòa =

- Commune
- Đức Hòa communal house
- Interactive map of Đức Hòa
- Coordinates: 10.822534038549945°N 106.45705582983364°E
- Country: Vietnam
- Province: Tây Ninh
- Region: Southeast
- Established: 2025
- Seat: ĐT 824, Ấp 3

Area
  - Total: 63.35 km^{2} (24.46 sq mi)

Population (31 December 2025)
  - Total: 52,208
  - Density: 824/km^{2} (2,130/sq mi)
- Website: duchoa.tayninh.gov.vn

Đức Hòa is a commune in Tây Ninh province, Vietnam.

On 12 June 2025, the 15th National Assembly of Vietnam adopted Resolution No. 202/2025/QH15 on the reorganization of provincial-level administrative units. Under the resolution, Long An province and Tây Ninh province were consolidated to form a new province named Tây Ninh.

On 16 June 2025, the Standing Committee of the National Assembly of Vietnam adopted Resolution No. 1682/NQ-UBTVQH15 on the reorganization of commune-level administrative units in Tây Ninh province in 2025. Under the resolution, the entire area and population of Đức Hòa township, Hựu Thạnh commune and Đức Hòa Hạ commune, formerly in Đức Hòa district, were consolidated to form a new commune named Đức Hòa.
