= Cần Đước district =

Coordinates: 10°32′21″N 106°36′33″E

Cần Đước district Huyện Cần Đước
- District
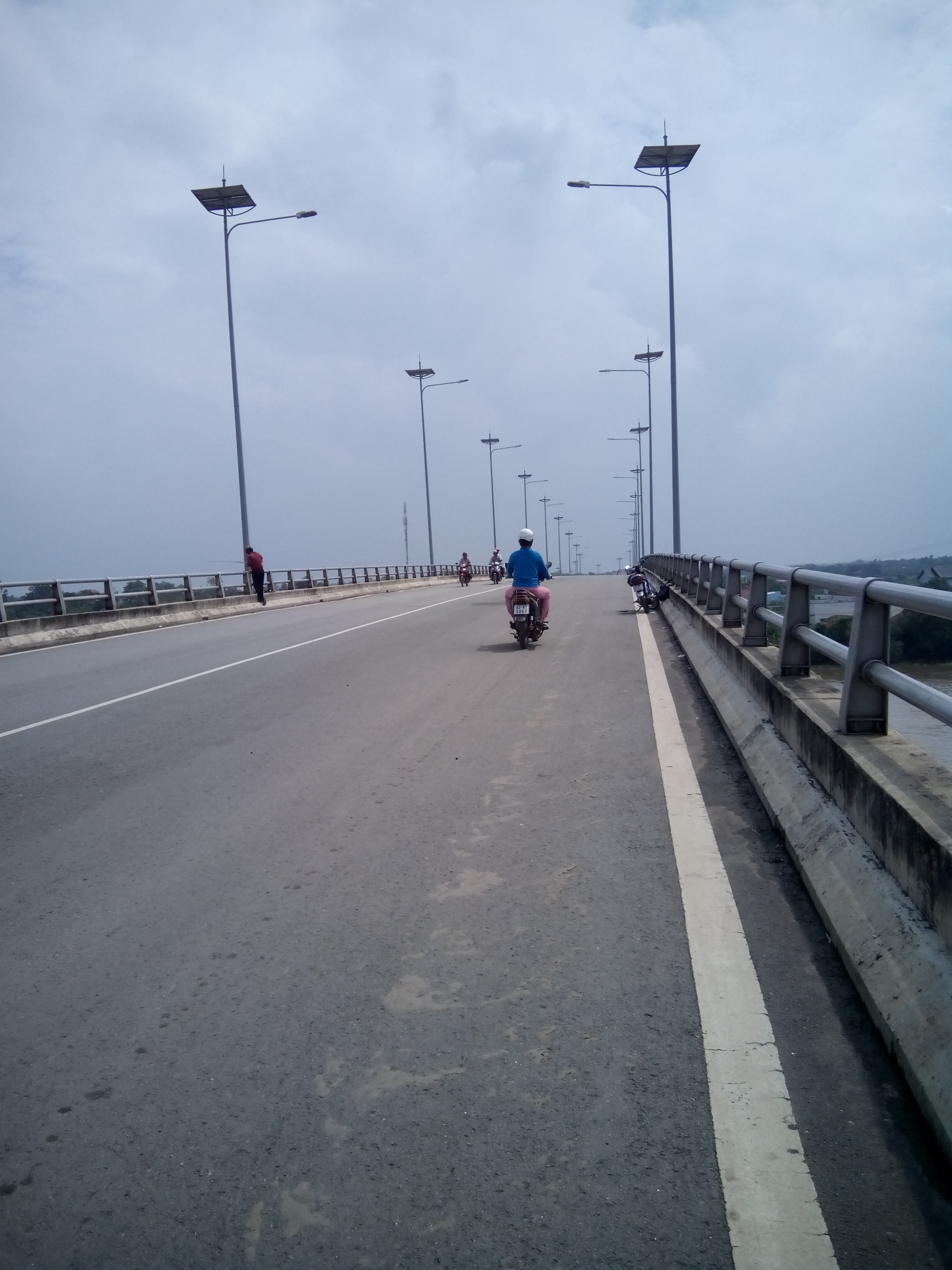
- Kinh Nước Mặn bridge, connecting the center of Cần Đước district with Long Hựu islands
- Interactive map of Cần Đước district
- Country: Vietnam
- Region: Mekong Delta
- Province: Long An
- Capital: Cần Đước

Area
  - Total: 84.25 sq mi (218.20 km^{2})

Population (2019)
  - Total: 187,359
- Time zone: UTC+07:00 (Indochina Time)

Cần Đước is a former rural district (huyện) of Long An province in the Mekong River Delta region of Vietnam. Cần Đước is located in the south of Long An. As of 2019 the district had a population of 187,359. The district covers an area of 218.20 km^{2}. The district capital lies at Cần Đước.

Cần Đước is famous for its Nàng Thơm Chợ Đào Rice.

== Divisions ==
The district is divided into the following communes:

Cần Đước, Long Hựu Đông, Long Hựu Tây, Phước Đông, Tân Chánh, Tân Ân, Tân Lân, Mỹ Lệ, Phước Tuy, Long Trạch, Long Hoà, Tân trạch, Long Sơn, Phước Vân, Long Định, Long Cang and Long Khê.

== History ==
At the beginning, Cần Đước was a small village located in a peninsula created by the Mương Ông Quỳnh and Rach Ben Ba distributaries. In 1698, the present-day Cần Đước belonged to Phiên Trấn fort. In 1808, it belonged to the town of Phiên An. In the 13th year of Minh Mạng's rule (1832), Cần Đước became part of Phước Lộc county, phủ (old subdivision of a province but larger than a county) Tân An, Gia Định Province. In 1867, Cần Đước became a county itself when Phước Lộc became a phủ. In 1871, Phước Lộc was merged into Chợ Lớn Province.

Located in center of Gò Công, Cần Giuộc, and Saigon, Cần Đước is a major rice growing area. It became a major stronghold for Trương Định's guerrilla campaign in southern Vietnam. This campaign is one of the earliest rebellions against the French invasion in defiance of Emperor Tự Đức. Emperor Tự Đức signed the Treaty of Saigon, ceding the three southern provinces of Gia Định, Định Tường and Biên Hòa to France. They became the colony of Cochinchina. Trương Định refused to recognise the treaty and continued guerrilla attacks against French patrols and their Vietnamese collaborators. During this time, many Cần Đước natives became part of the guerrilla leadership. Thong binh duong Bui Quan Dieu, who commanded the famous battle of Cần Giuộc, is from Cần Đước. Nguyen Van Tien, another Cần Đước native, led several groups of guerrilla in the area. He was later captured and killed by the French. After the death of Trương Định on August 19, 1864, Cần Đước became part of another guerrilla campaign against the French authority which was led by Nguyễn Trung Trực.

In the early 20th century, Cần Đước became part of many nationalist movements such as Thiên Địa Hội or the Nguyễn An Ninh society.

After the end of the First Indochina War, Cần Đước became a county part of Chợ Lớn Province in 1954 under the new state of South Vietnam. In 1956, Tân An and part of Chợ Lớn separated into a new province called Long An. Cần Đước then became a county of Long An Province. The government divided Cần Đước into two districts: Cần Đước and Rạch Kiến.

After the end of the Second Indochina War (Vietnam War), Cần Đước restored its original boundaries, as it is today.
