= Tân Thạnh district =

Coordinates: 10°36′N 106°06′E

Tân Thạnh district Huyện Tân Thạnh
- District
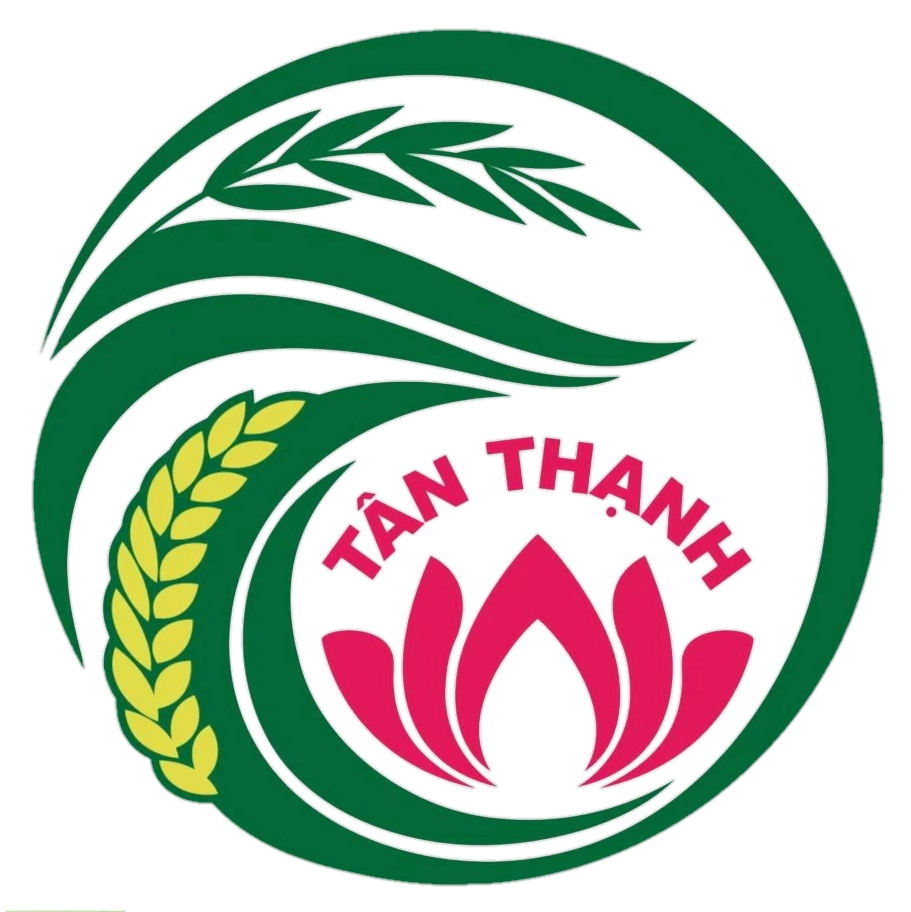
- Seal
- Country: Vietnam
- Region: Mekong Delta
- Province: Long An
- Capital: Tân Thạnh township

Area
  - Total: 158 sq mi (408 km^{2})

Population (2003)
  - Total: 78,970
- Time zone: UTC+07:00 (Indochina Time)

Tân Thạnh was a rural district (huyện) of Long An province in the Mekong Delta region of Vietnam.

As of 2003 the district had a population of 78,970. The district covers an area of 408 km^{2} (158 sq mi). The district capital lies at Tân Thạnh township.

On June 16, 2025, the Standing Committee of the National Assembly issued Resolution No. 1685/NQ-UBTVQH15. The district was dissolved and new wards were rearranged from the district.

== Divisions ==
The district is divided into one urban municipality and 12 communes:

Tân Thạnh township, Bắc Hòa, Hậu Thạnh Đông, Hậu Thạnh Tây, Kiến Bình, Nhơn Hòa, Nhơn Hòa Lập, Nhơn Ninh, Tân Bình, Tân Hòa, Tân Lập and Tân Ninh.
