= Mộc Hóa district =

Coordinates: 10.750°N 106.000°E

Mộc Hóa district Huyện Mộc Hóa
- District
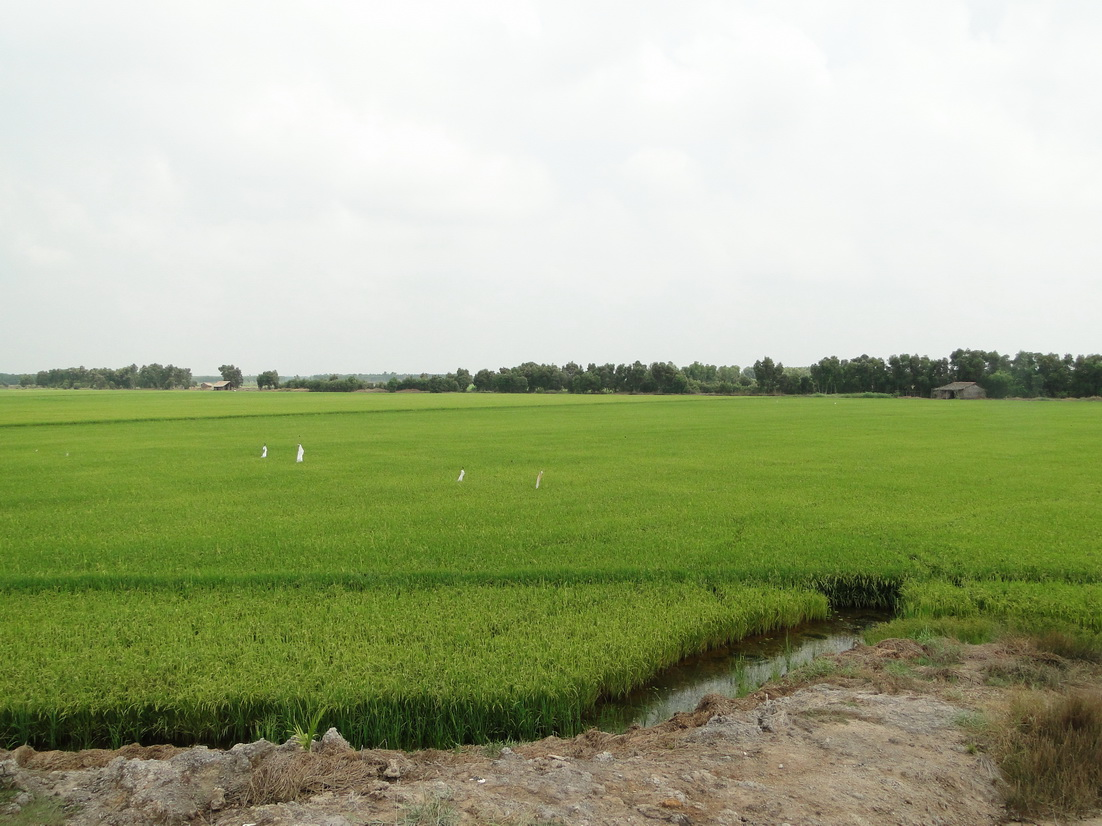
- View of the rice fields in Mộc Hóa

- Location within Vietnam
- Country: Vietnam
- Region: Mekong Delta
- Province: Long An
- Capital: Bình Phong Thạnh

Area
  - Total: 297.64 km^{2} (114.92 sq mi)

Population (2003)
  - Total: 67,753
- Time zone: UTC+07:00 (Indochina Time)

Mộc Hóa is a former rural district (huyện) of Long An province in the Mekong Delta region of Vietnam.

In 1963 team A-414 Special Forces set up operations at Kien Tuong. In 1965 Seabee team 0503 upgraded the outpost to a B camp for team B-41. In 1966 the camp became home to the Mobile Strike Force(Mike Force) for IV Corps. MACV-SOG ran reconnaissance missions into Cambodia from there and the RVN army took over the base in 1970.

== Divisions ==
Since 2013, the district has been divided into seven communes:

1. Bình Phong Thạnh
2. Tân Thành
3. Tân Lập
4. Bình Hòa Đông
5. Bình Hòa Trung
6. Bình Hòa Tây
7. Bình Thạnh

In 2003 the district had a population of 67,753 and covered an area of 501 km^{2} (193 sq mi). The district capital was at the town also known as Mộc Hóa. In 2013, the town of Mộc Hóa and the nearby communes of Bình Hiệp, Bình Tân, Thạnh Hưng, Thạnh Trị and Tuyên Thạnh were separated to create the district-level town of Kiến Tường. The headquarters of the new Mộc Hóa District were moved to Bình Phong Thạnh.

== Climate ==
Climate data for Mộc Hóa
Month	Jan	Feb	Mar	Apr	May	Jun	Jul	Aug	Sep	Oct	Nov	Dec	Year
Record high °C (°F)	34.8 (94.6)	35.8 (96.4)	37.2 (99.0)	38.2 (100.8)	38.6 (101.5)	37.0 (98.6)	35.6 (96.1)	35.6 (96.1)	35.8 (96.4)	34.8 (94.6)	34.0 (93.2)	34.3 (93.7)	38.6 (101.5)
Mean daily maximum °C (°F)	31.1 (88.0)	32.2 (90.0)	33.8 (92.8)	34.8 (94.6)	33.9 (93.0)	32.6 (90.7)	32.2 (90.0)	31.9 (89.4)	31.4 (88.5)	31.1 (88.0)	31.1 (88.0)	30.7 (87.3)	32.2 (90.0)
Daily mean °C (°F)	26.0 (78.8)	26.3 (79.3)	27.6 (81.7)	28.9 (84.0)	28.6 (83.5)	27.8 (82.0)	27.4 (81.3)	27.6 (81.7)	27.9 (82.2)	27.8 (82.0)	27.4 (81.3)	26.3 (79.3)	27.5 (81.5)
Mean daily minimum °C (°F)	22.4 (72.3)	22.6 (72.7)	23.8 (74.8)	25.2 (77.4)	25.6 (78.1)	25.1 (77.2)	24.7 (76.5)	25.1 (77.2)	25.5 (77.9)	25.4 (77.7)	24.8 (76.6)	23.0 (73.4)	24.4 (75.9)
Record low °C (°F)	16.4 (61.5)	17.4 (63.3)	16.2 (61.2)	22.3 (72.1)	21.7 (71.1)	21.9 (71.4)	21.3 (70.3)	21.6 (70.9)	22.1 (71.8)	21.3 (70.3)	18.7 (65.7)	15.7 (60.3)	15.7 (60.3)
Average precipitation mm (inches)	13.5 (0.53)	6.9 (0.27)	17.2 (0.68)	66.6 (2.62)	168.1 (6.62)	165.0 (6.50)	188.0 (7.40)	177.5 (6.99)	260.2 (10.24)	336.7 (13.26)	177.4 (6.98)	50.5 (1.99)	1,627.6 (64.08)
Average rainy days	2.5	1.1	2.4	6.8	15.4	17.2	19.7	18.6	20.1	21.1	13.1	6.0	144.2
Average relative humidity (%)	77.6	77.8	76.8	77.1	81.9	84.5	84.8	84.2	83.6	82.4	79.8	77.3	80.7
Mean monthly sunshine hours	253.4	247.2	272.6	246.0	227.5	190.8	194.0	191.3	186.8	201.2	221.6	232.5	2,659.3
Source: Vietnam Institute for Building Science and Technology
