= Nam Trà My district =

Nam Trà My district Huyện Nam Trà My
- District
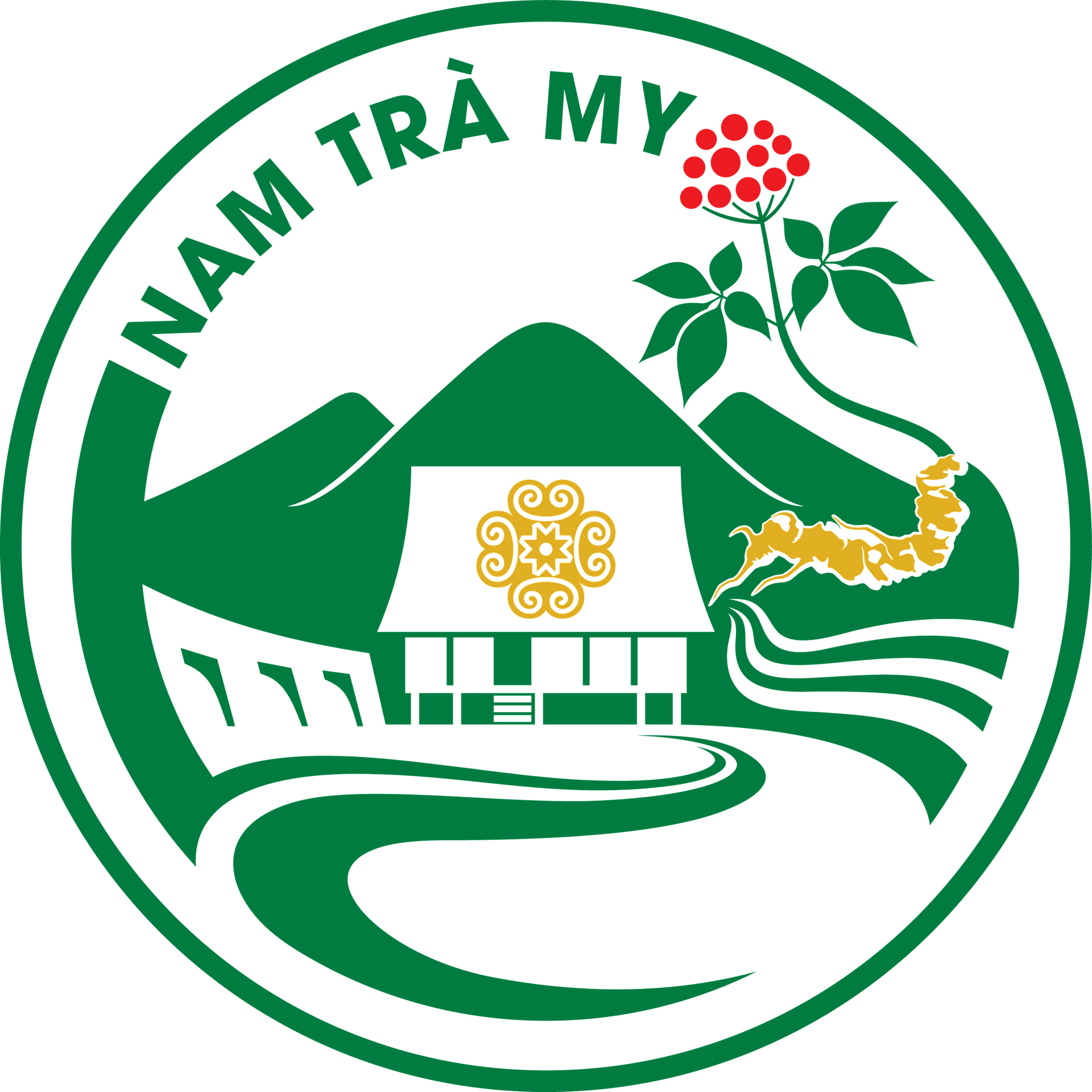
- Seal
- Interactive map of Nam Trà My district
- Country: Vietnam
- Region: South Central Coast
- Province: Quảng Nam
- Capital: Trà Mai

Area
  - Total: 317 sq mi (822 km^{2})

Population (2003)
  - Total: 27,297
- Time zone: UTC+7 (Indochina Time)

Nam Trà My is a former rural district (huyện) of Quảng Nam province in the South Central Coast region of Vietnam. The district is known for its production of Saigon Cinnamon. As of 2003 the district had a population of 19,876. The district covers an area of 822 km^{2} (317 sq mi). The district capital lies at Trà Mai.
