= Tân Thạnh, Tây Ninh =

Tân Thạnh
- Commune
- Location in Vietnam
- Country: Vietnam
- Province: Tây Ninh Province
- Time zone: UTC+7 (UTC+7)

Tân Thạnh is a commune (xã) of Tây Ninh Province, in south-western Vietnam.
