= Vĩnh Hưng district =

Coordinates: 10.917°N 105.750°E

Vĩnh Hưng district Huyện Vĩnh Hưng
- District
- Country: Vietnam
- Region: Mekong Delta
- Province: Long An
- Capital: Vinh Hung

Area
  - Total: 147 sq mi (382 km^{2})

Population (2018)
  - Total: 57,364
- Time zone: UTC+07:00 (Indochina Time)

Vĩnh Hưng is a rural district of Long An province in the Mekong Delta region of Vietnam. As of 2003 the district had a population of 43,777. The district covers an area of 382 km^{2} (147 sq mi). The district capital lies at Vĩnh Hưng.
