= Cần Đước =

Cần Đước Phường Cần Đước
- Ward
- Cần Đước ward
- Location within Vietnam
- Coordinates: 10°30′14″N 106°36′19″E
- Country: Vietnam
- Region: Mekong Delta
- Province: Tây Ninh
- Time zone: UTC+7 (UTC + 7)

Cần Đước is a ward (phường) of Tây Ninh Province, Vietnam.
