= Tân Hưng district =

Coordinates: 10.833°N 105.667°E

Tân Hưng district Huyện Tân Hưng
- District
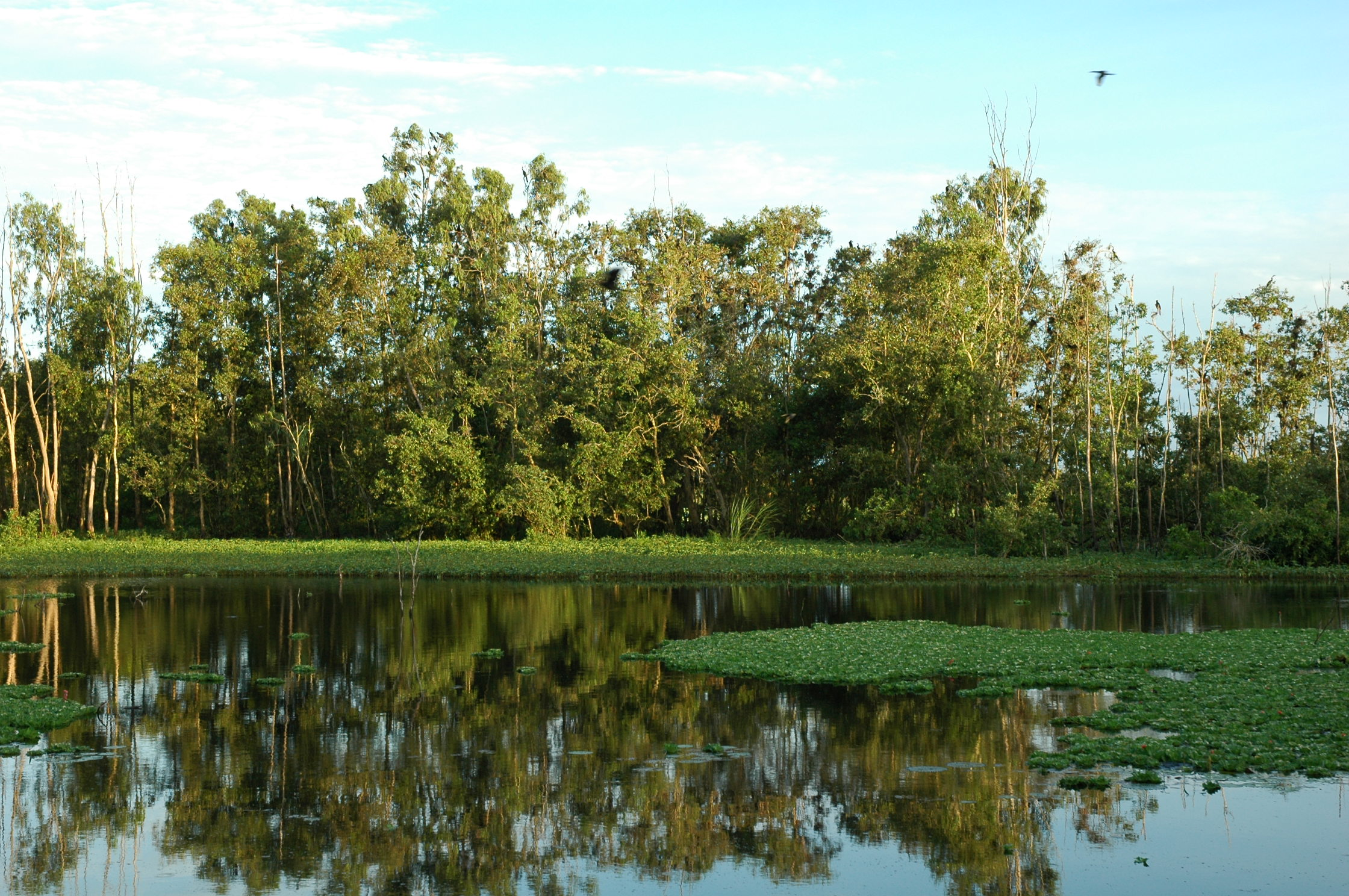
- Melaleuca forest belongs to Láng Sen wetland conservation area

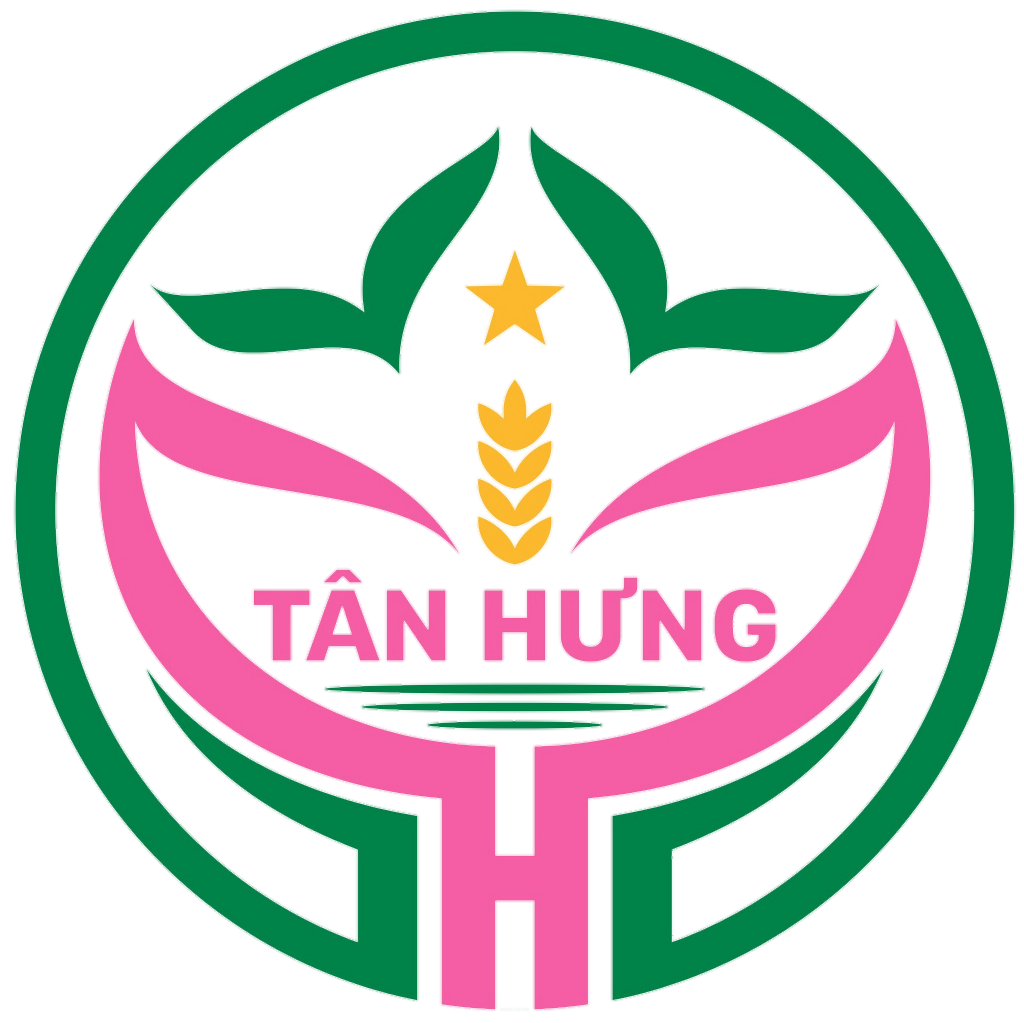
- Seal
- Country: Vietnam
- Region: Mekong Delta
- Province: Long An
- Capital: Tân Hưng

Area
  - Total: 207 sq mi (536 km^{2})

Population (2018)
  - Total: 57,742
- Time zone: UTC+07:00 (Indochina Time)

Tân Hưng is a rural district (huyện) of Long An province in the Mekong Delta region of Vietnam. As of 2003, the district had a population of 41,813. The district covers an area of 536 km^{2}. The district capital lies at Tân Hưng.

== Divisions ==
The district is divided into 10 communes:

1. Vĩnh Đại
2. Vĩnh Châu A
3. Vĩnh Châu B
4. Vĩnh Lợi
5. Vĩnh Thạnh
6. Thạnh Hưng
7. Hưng Thạnh
8. Hưng Hà
9. Hưng Điền
10. Hưng Điền B
