= Thủ Thừa district =

Coordinates: 10.717°N 106.333°E

Thủ Thừa district Huyện Thủ Thừa
- District
- Location within Vietnam Location within Southeast Asia Location within Asia
- Country: Vietnam
- Region: Mekong Delta
- Province: Long An
- Capital: Thủ Thừa

Area
  - Total: 189 sq mi (489 km^{2})

Population (2018)
  - Total: 160,000
- Time zone: UTC+07:00 (Indochina Time)

Thủ Thừa is a rural district of Long An province in the Mekong Delta region of Vietnam. As of 2003 the district had a population of 88,455. The district covers an area of 489 km^{2}. The district capital lies at Thủ Thừa.

== Divisions ==
The district is divided into one urban municipality and 12 communes:

Thủ Thừa (urban), Long Thành, Long Thuận, Mỹ Lạc, Mỹ Thạnh, Mỹ An, Mỹ Phú, Tân Thành, Bình An, Bình Thạnh, Nhị Thành, Long Thành and Tân Lập.
