= Châu Thành district, Long An =

Coordinates: 10°27′52″N 106°30′00″E

Châu Thành district Huyện Châu Thành
- District
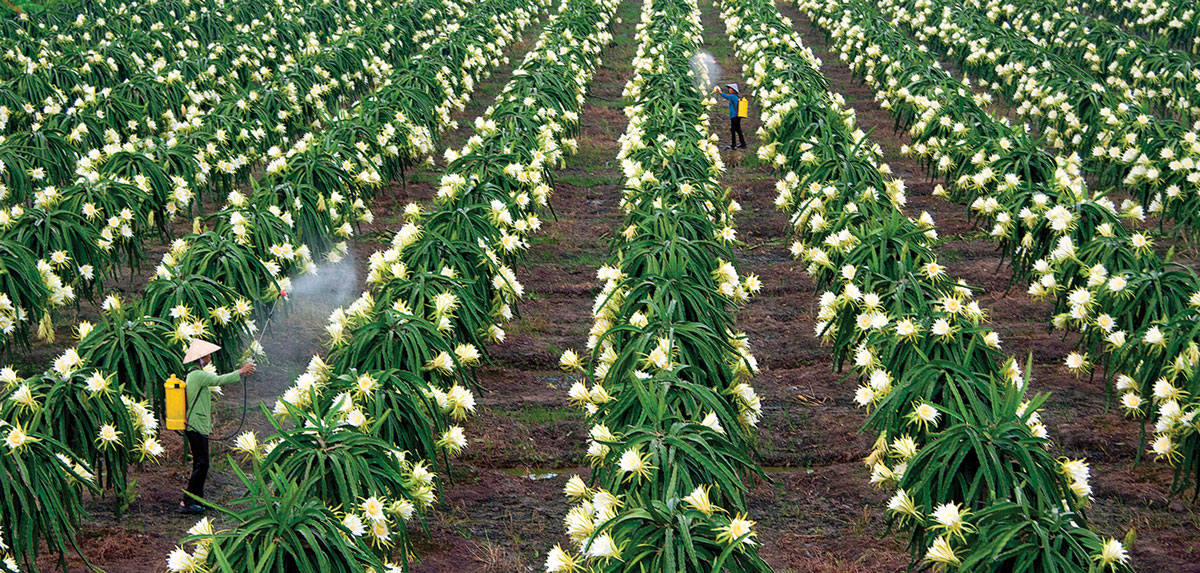
- Dragon fruit farm in Châu Thành district
- Interactive map of Châu Thành district
- Country: Vietnam
- Region: Mekong Delta
- Province: Long An
- Capital: Tầm Vu

Area
  - Total: 58 sq mi (151 km^{2})

Population (2003)
  - Total: 102,409
- Time zone: UTC+07:00 (Indochina Time)

Châu Thành was a rural district (huyện) of Long An province in the Mekong River Delta region of Vietnam. It is the birthplace of former Army of the Republic of Vietnam general Trần Thiện Khiêm. As of 2003 the district had a population of 102,409. The district covers an area of 151 km^{2} (58 sq mi). The district capital lies at Tầm Vu.

On June 16, 2025, the Standing Committee of the National Assembly issued Resolution No. 1685/NQ-UBTVQH15. The district was dissolved and new wards were rearranged from the district.
