= Cần Giuộc district =

Coordinates: 10.583°N 106.667°E

Cần Giuộc district Huyện Cần Giuộc
- District
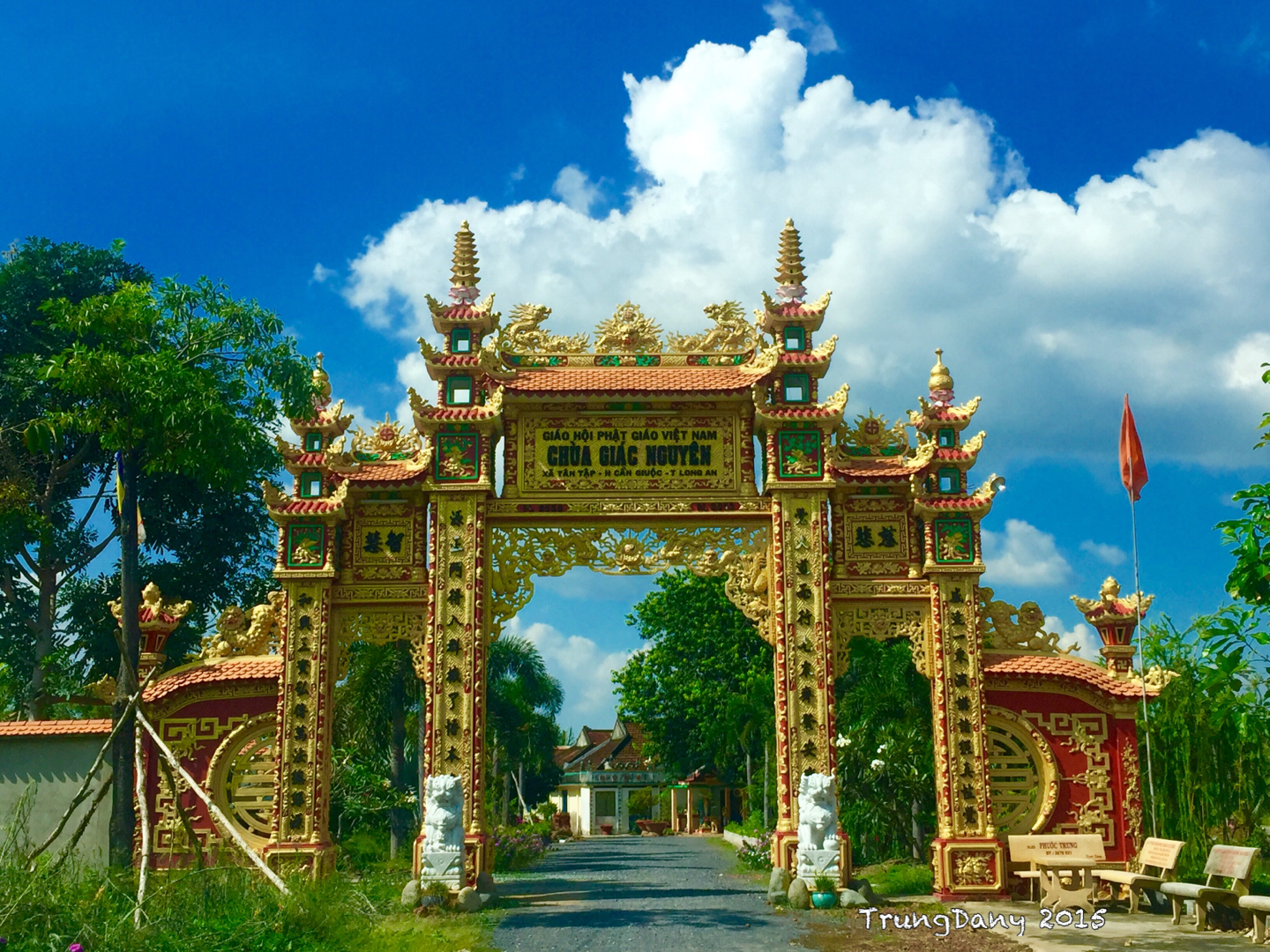
- Entrance to Tân Tập (xã)
- Interactive map of Cần Giuộc district
- Country: Vietnam
- Region: Mekong Delta
- Province: Long An
- Capital: Cần Giuộc

Area
  - Total: 81 sq mi (211 km^{2})

Population (2018)
  - Total: 192,329
- Time zone: UTC+07:00 (Indochina Time)

Cần Giuộc is a rural district of Long An province in the Mekong Delta region of Vietnam. As of 2003 the district had a population of 161,399. The district covers an area of 211 km^{2}. The district capital lies at Cần Giuộc.

== Divisions ==
The district is divided into 16 communes:

1. Đông Thạnh
2. Long An
3. Long Hậu
4. Long Phụng
5. Long Thượng
6. Mỹ Lộc
7. Phước Hậu
8. Phước Lại
9. Phước Lâm
10. Phước Lý
11. Phước Vĩnh Đông
12. Phước Vĩnh Tây
13. Tân Kim
14. Tân Tập
15. Thuận Thành
16. Trường Bình
