= Thạnh Hóa district =

Thạnh Hóa district Huyện Thạnh Hóa
- District
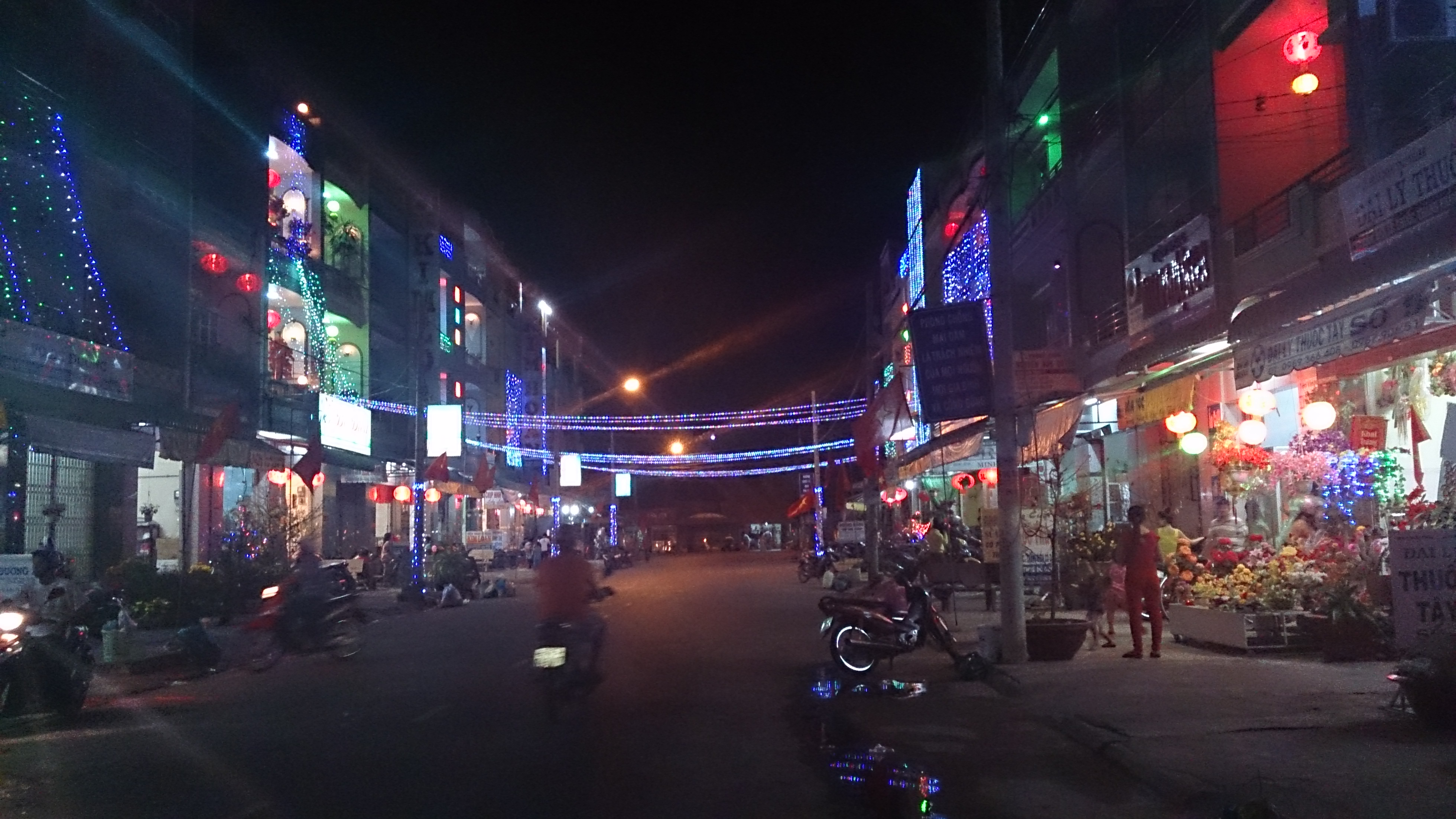
- Street in Thanh Hoa district
- Coordinates: 10°41′06″N 106°10′02″E
- Country: Vietnam
- Region: Mekong Delta
- Province: Long An province
- Capital: Thạnh Hóa

Area
  - Total: 176 sq mi (455 km^{2})

Population (2018)
  - Total: 58,778
- Time zone: UTC+7 (Indochina Time)

Thạnh Hóa is a rural district of Long An province in the Mekong Delta region of Vietnam. As of 2003, the district had a population of 52,691. The district covers an area of 455 km^{2} (176 sq mi). The district capital lies at Thạnh Hóa.

== Divisions ==
The district is divided into the following communes: Thạnh Hóa (urban), Thủy Đông, Thủy Tây, Tân Đông, Tân Tây, Thạnh Phước, Thạnh Phú, Thuận Nghĩa Hòa, Thuận Bình, Thạnh An, and Tân Hiệp.
