= Tân Trụ district =

Coordinates: 10.583°N 106.500°E

Tân Trụ district Huyện Tân Trụ
- District
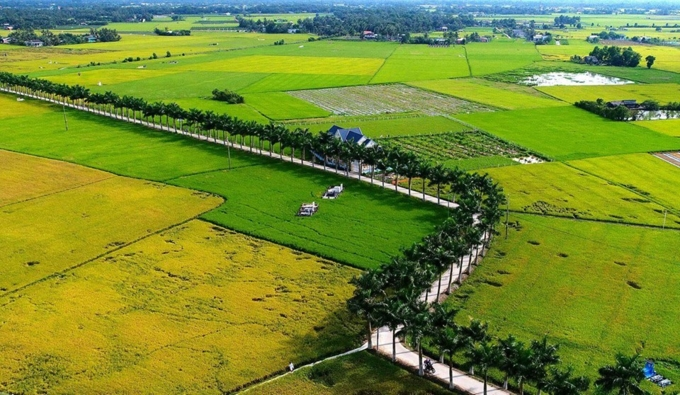
- Aerial view of the fields
- Country: Vietnam
- Region: Mekong Delta
- Province: Long An
- Capital: Tân Trụ

Area
  - Total: 68 sq mi (175 km^{2})

Population (2018)
  - Total: 80,596
- Time zone: UTC+07:00 (Indochina Time)

Tân Trụ is a rural district of Long An province in the Mekong Delta region of Vietnam. As of 2003 the district had a population of 62,633. The district covers an area of 175 km^{2} (68 sq mi). The district capital lies at Tân Trụ.

== Divisions ==
1. Nhựt Ninh
2. Đức Tân
3. Tân Phước Tây
4. Bình Tịnh
5. Bình Trinh Đông
6. Bình Lãng
7. Lạc Tấn
8. Quê Mỹ Thạnh
9. Mỹ Bình
10. An Nhựt Tân
