= Bến Lức district =

Coordinates: 10.667°N 106.417°E

Ben Luc district Huyện Bến Lức
- District
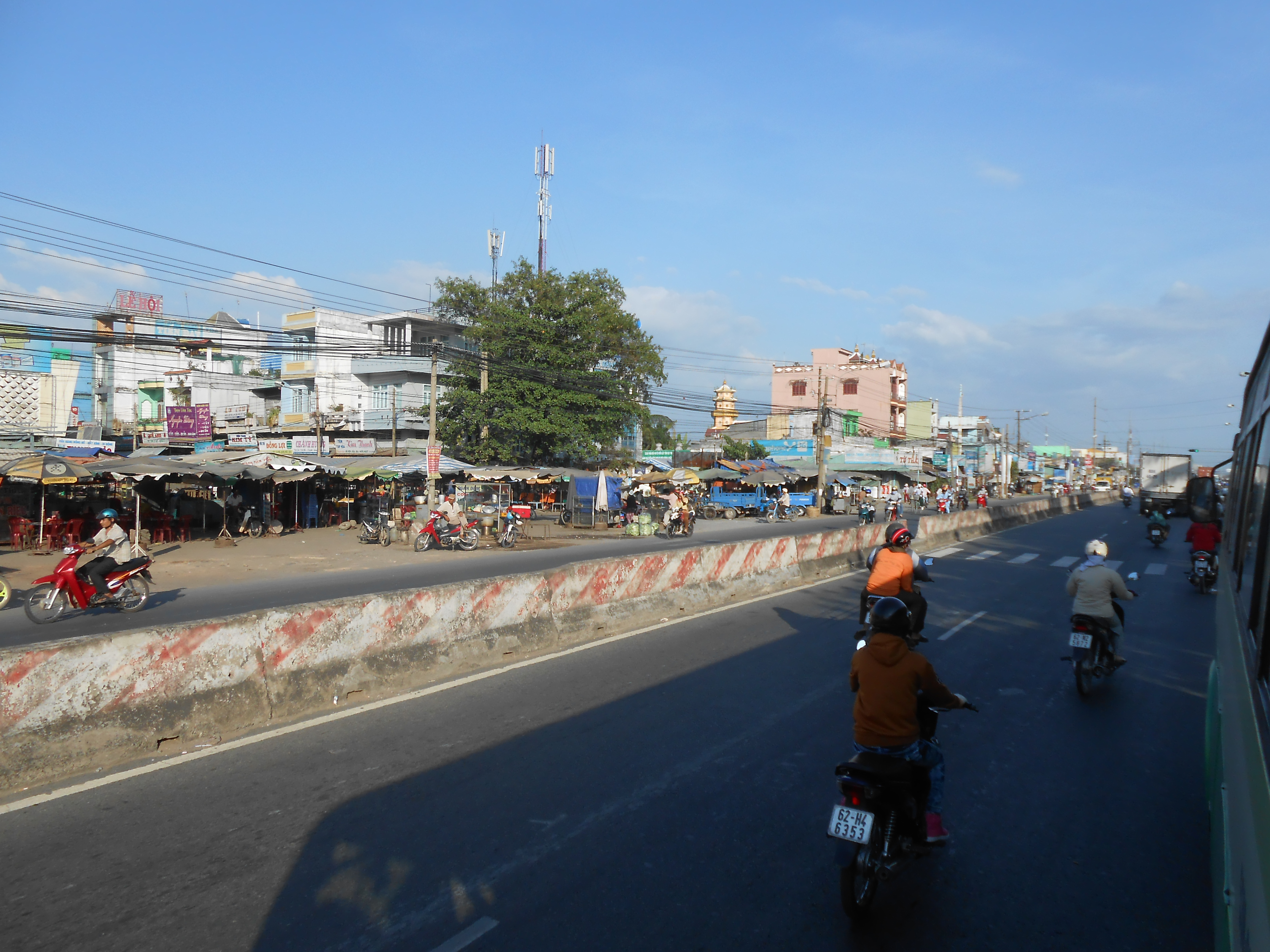
- Bến Lức town centre
- Interactive map of Ben Luc district
- Country: Vietnam
- Region: Mekong Delta
- Province: Long An
- Capital: Bến Lức

Area
  - Total: 110 sq mi (290 km^{2})

Population (2018)
  - Total: 195,000
- Time zone: UTC+07:00 (Indochina Time)

Bến Lức is a rural district (huyện) of Long An province in the Mekong Delta region of Vietnam. As of 2003 the district had a population of 128,849. The district covers 290 km^{2} (110 sq mi). The district capital lies at Bến Lức.

== Divisions ==
The district is divided into 15 communes:

- Thị trấn Bến Lức
- Mỹ Yên
- Phước Lợi
- Long Hiệp
- Nhựt Chánh
- Thạnh Đức
- Bình Đức
- An Thạnh
- Thanh Phú
- Tân Bửu
- Tân Hòa
- Lương Hòa
- Thạnh Hòa
- Lương Bình
- Thạnh Lợi
