= Đức Hòa district =

Coordinates: 10°53′04″N 106°23′58″E

Đức Hòa district Huyện Đức Hòa
- District
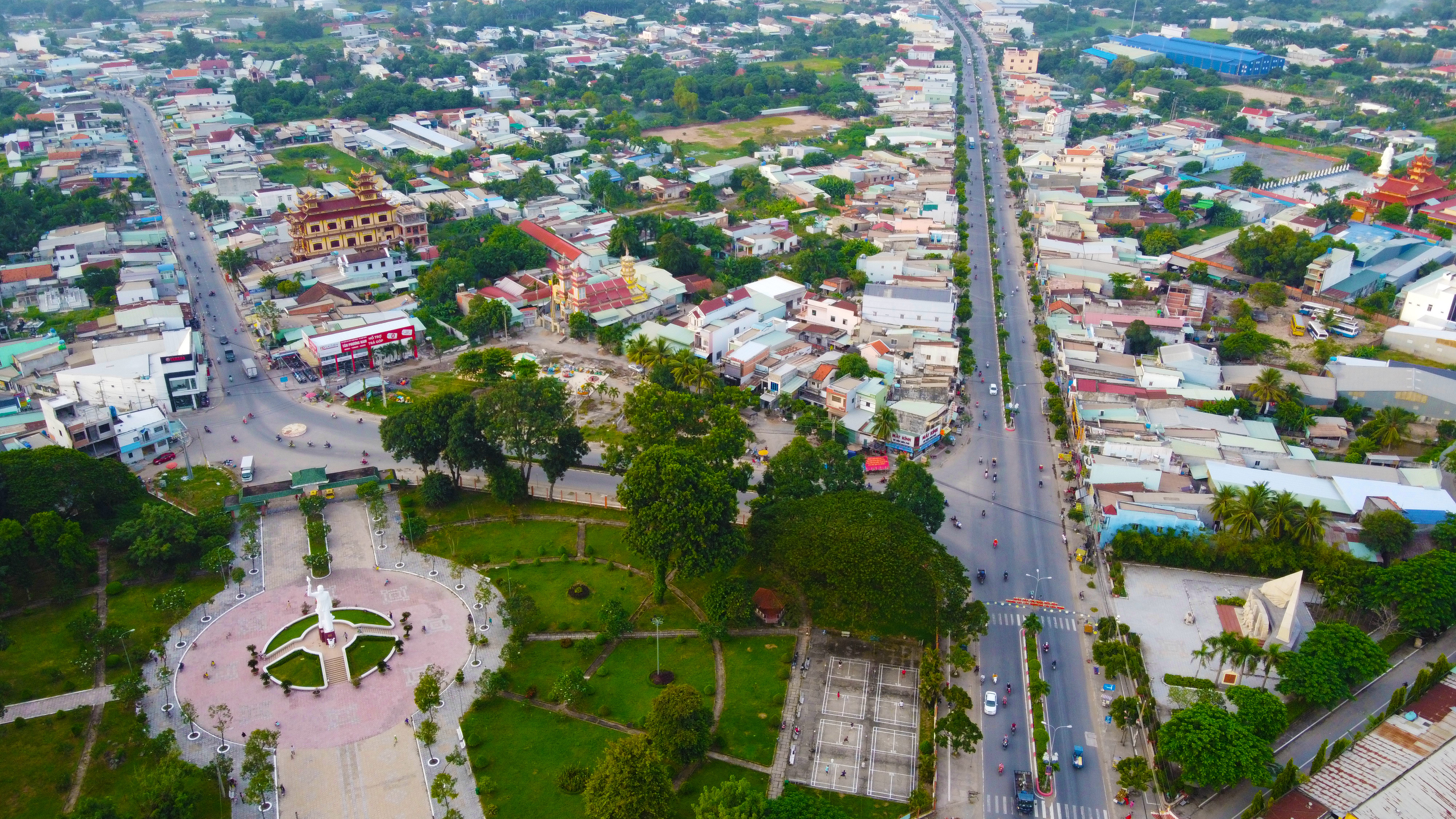
- Panoramic view of Đức Hoà town, Đức Hòa district

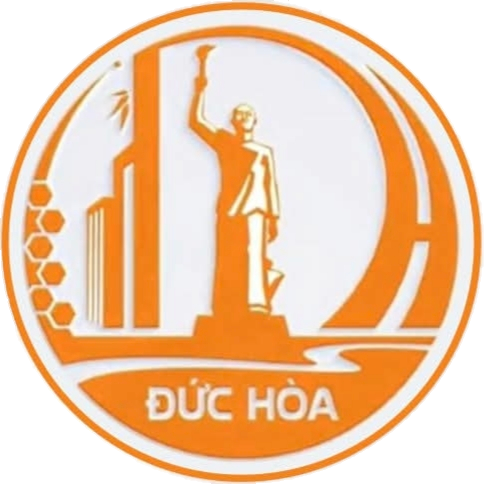
- Seal
- Country: Vietnam
- Region: Mekong Delta
- Province: Long An
- Capital: Hậu Nghĩa

Area
  - Total: 164 sq mi (426 km^{2})

Population (2019)
  - Total: 345,817
- Time zone: UTC+07:00 (Indochina Time)
- Website: www.longan.gov.vn

Đức Hòa was a former rural district (huyện) of Long An province in the Mekong Delta region of Vietnam. As of 2003 the district had a population of 199,181. The district covers an area of 426 km^{2} (164 sq mi). The district capital lies at Hậu Nghĩa.

== Divisions ==
The district is subdivided into 20 commune-level subdivisions, including the townships of: Hậu Nghĩa, Đức Hòa and Hiệp Hòa, and the rural communes of: Lộc Giang, An Ninh Đông, An Ninh Tây, Tân Mỹ, Hiệp Hòa, Tân Phú, Hoà Khánh Tây, Hoà Khánh Đông, Hoà Khánh Nam, Đức Lập Thượng, Đức Lập Hạ, Đức Hoà Thượng, Đức Hoà Đông, Đức Hoà Hạ, Mỹ Hạnh Bắc, Mỹ Hạnh Nam and Hựu Thạnh.
