= Long An province =

Former province of Vietnam

Long An
- Province
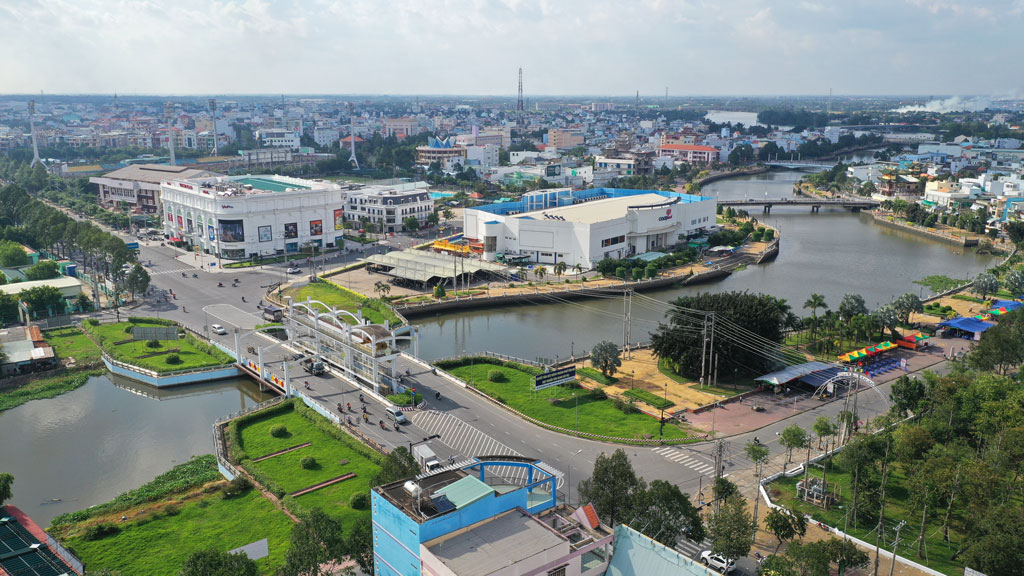
- Downtown of Tân An city with Bảo Định river

- Location of Long An within Vietnam
- Coordinates: 10°40′N 106°10′E
- Country: Vietnam
- Region: Mekong Delta
- Metropolitan area: Ho Chi Minh City metropolitan area
- Dissolved: 12 June 2025
- Capital: Tân An

Government
  - People's Council Chair: Nguyễn Văn Được
  - People's Committee Chair: Nguyễn Văn Út

Area
  - Total: 4,494.79 km^{2} (1,735.45 sq mi)

Population (2025)
  - Total: 1,869,746
  - Density: 415.981/km^{2} (1,077.39/sq mi)

Demographics
  - Ethnicities: Vietnamese, Hoa, Khmer

GDP
  - Total: VND 168.108 trillion US$ 7.053 billion (2023)
- Time zone: UTC+7 (ICT)
- Calling code: 72
- ISO 3166 code: VN-41
- HDI (2020): ▲0.720 (27th)
- Website: eng.longan.gov.vn

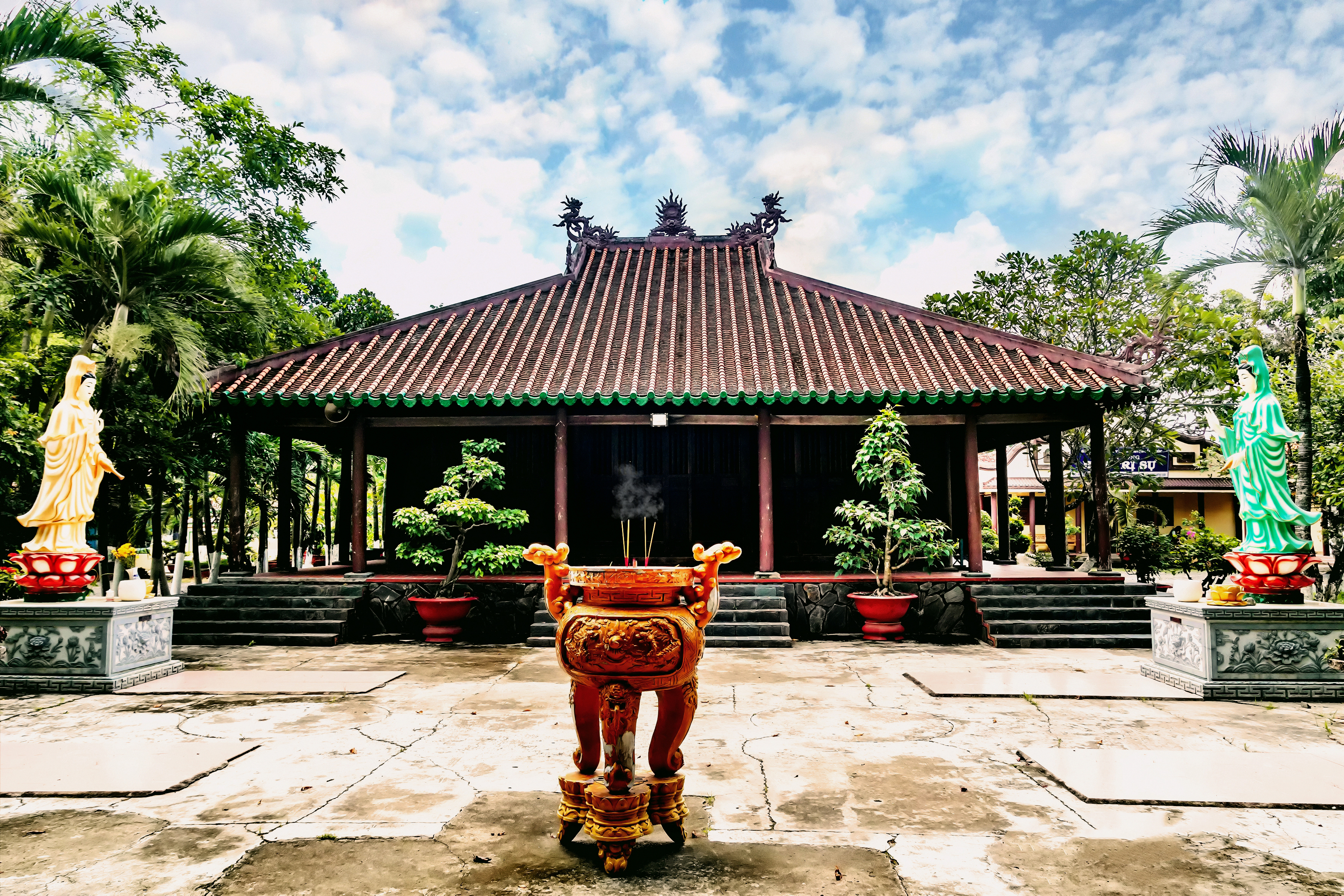
Tôn Thạnh Temple, an ancient temple in Long An

Long An is a former province in the Mekong Delta region of southern Vietnam. The provincial capital is Tân An city, and other major districts and town include Kiến Tường, Bến Lức, Cần Giuộc and Đức Hòa. There are 15 districts within the province (included 1 provincial capital city and 1 district-level town).

The region is between Ho Chi Minh City and Southeast region in the north and the Mekong Delta. Because of its low lying geography, it is susceptible to sea level rise caused by climate change.

On 12 June 2025, Long An was incorporated with Tây Ninh province.

== Geography ==
Long An is situated in an advantageous position in the Southern Key Economic Region of Vietnam. It serves as a bridge between Ho Chi Minh City in the north and 12 provinces in the Mekong Delta in the south. The province also has Cambodia to its west and the South China Sea to its east.

Long An is a low-lying coastal region, and therefore some areas of it are subject to flooding during the rainy season, which lasts from the beginning of August until November.

The province has numerous rivers. Two of the main ones are the Vàm Cỏ Đông and Vàm Cỏ Tay, which connect with the Tiền to form a larger river system. Another important river in the region is the Soài Rạp.

== History ==
Archaeological sites show that, since ancient times, Long An has been an important territory of the Funan-Zhenla kingdom. When Nguyễn Hữu Cảnh came to explore the South, Long An belonged to Gia Định prefecture. During the reign of Minh Mạng, Long An belonged to Gia Định province and partly to Định Tường province. In the early days of French colonization, Nam Kỳ was divided into 21 provinces, and Long An was located within the two provinces of Tân An and Chợ Lớn.

Long An was a province in the Mekong Delta region of southern Vietnam. It was dissolved on 12 June 2025 and its territory was merged into Tây Ninh province.

== Administrative divisions ==
Long An is subdivided into 15 district-level sub-divisions:

- 13 districts:
  - Bến Lức
  - Cần Đước
  - Cần Giuộc
  - Châu Thành
  - Đức Hòa
  - Đức Huệ
  - Mộc Hóa
  - Tân Hưng
  - Tân Thạnh
  - Tân Trụ
  - Thạnh Hóa
  - Thủ Thừa
  - Vĩnh Hưng
- 1 district-level town:
  - Kiến Tường
- 1 provincial city:
  - Tân An (capital)

They are further subdivided into 14 commune-level towns (or townlets), 166 communes, and 12 wards.

== Economy ==
Long An is renowned for its diverse agricultural products, including Tài Nguyên rice, Nàng Thơm Chợ Đào rice, Gò Đen rice wine, Long Trì watermelon, Bến Lức pineapple, Đức Hòa peanuts, Thủ Thừa sugarcane, and Châu Thành dragon fruit. Notably, high-quality rice is the province’s key agricultural product for export.

The industrial sector contributes approximately 50% of the province’s economic output, with prominent industries including textiles and garments, processed foods, and construction. In the 2018 Provincial Competitiveness Index (PCI) rankings, Long An ranked 2nd among the 13 Mekong Delta provinces and 3rd nationwide.

In 2019, the province’s industrial production value was estimated at 315.2 trillion VND. Its Gross Regional Domestic Product (GRDP) was estimated at 123 trillion VND, and budget revenue reached 18 trillion VND.

== Climate change concerns ==
Being a low-lying coastal region, Long An is particularly susceptible to floods resulting from rises in sea level due to climate change. The Climate Change Research Institute at Can Tho University (Trường Đại học Cần Thơ), in studying the possible consequences of climate change, has predicted that 49% of Long An province is expected to be flooded if sea levels rise by one meter.

== Universities ==
Long An is home to two large universities:

- Long An University of Economics and Industry (Trường Đại Học Kinh Tế Công Nghiệp Long An)
- Tan Tao University (Trường Đại Học Tân Tạo)

== Hospitals ==
- TWG Hospital Long An (Bệnh viện TWG Long An)

136C ĐT827, P7, Tân An, Long An 82100, Vietnam
