= Trảng Bom =

Trảng Bom Phường Trảng Bom
- Ward
- Trảng Bom ward
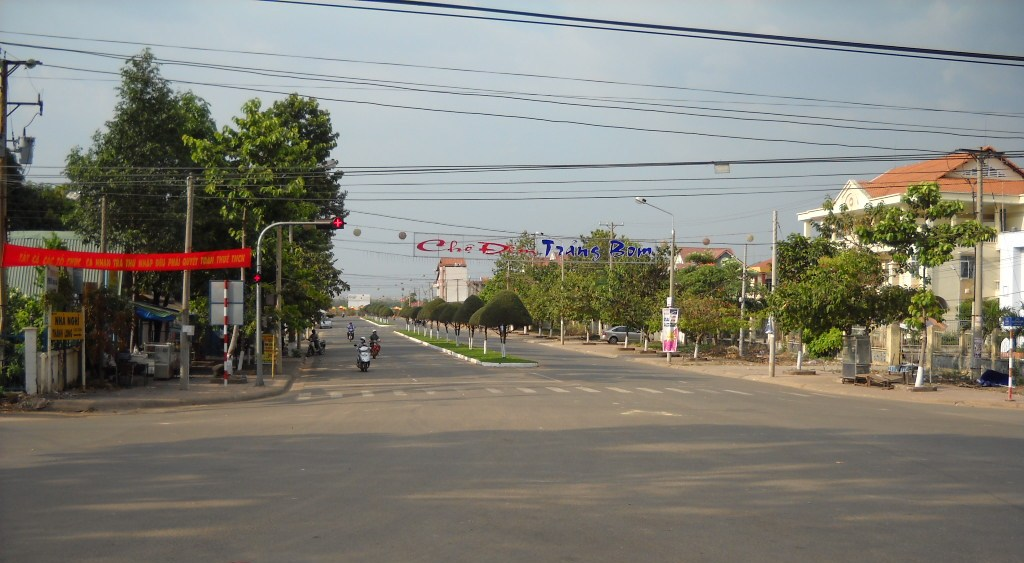

- Location within Vietnam
- Coordinates: 10°57′11″N 107°00′13″E
- Country: Vietnam
- Region: Southeast
- Municipality: Đồng Nai

Area
  - Total: 26.6 sq mi (68.8 km^{2})

Population
  - Total: 92,712
  - Density: 3,490/sq mi (1,350/km^{2})
- Time zone: UTC+7 (UTC + 7)

Trảng Bom is a ward (phường) of Đồng Nai, Vietnam.

== Geography ==
Trảng Bom is a ward located at the southwest of the Municipality of Đồng Nai, 25 km to the east of Trấn Biên, formetly part of the former Trảng Bom district, adjacent to:

- Bàu Hàm commune to the northeast
- Hưng Thịnh and An Viễn communes to the easr
- Tam Phước ward to the south
- Phước Tân ward and Bình Minh commune to the west
- Tân An commune to the northwest

According to Official Dispatch No. 2896/BNV-CQĐP dated May 27, 2025 of the Ministry of Home Affairs, following the merger, as of December 31, 2024, Trảng Bom has a land area of 68.8 km², the population is 92,712 people, the population density is 1,347 people/km².

== History ==
During the Nguyễn dynasty, Trảng Bom ward was part of Đông Thành commune, Phước Thành canton, Phước Bình county, Biên Hòa province.

Until the French Indochina, this area was merged into Bình Trước commune (it is equivalent to the City of Biên Hòa), Phước Vĩnh Thượng canton, Châu Thành county.

In 1957, the South Vietnam government established Trảng Bom commune of Phước Vĩnh Thượng canton, Châu Thành county.

In 1963, Châu Thành county changed its name to Đức Tu, Trảng Bom commune was under Đức Tu county.

Until 1976, the communes of Trảng Bom 1, Giang Điền and Hố Nai 4 was part of Thống Nhất district. Then, commune of Trảng Bom was the capital of Thống Nhất district.

29 August 1994, the Vietnam government established Decree No. 109-CP about re-established the district of Vĩnh Cửu; adjusting the boundaries of some communes and wards of the city of Biên Hòa and districts of Long Khánh, Long Thành, Nhơn Trạch, Tân Phú, Thống Nhất, Xuân Lộc, Đồng Nai province. Accordingly:

- Divide Trảng Bom 1 commune into: Trảng Bom township and Sông Trầu commune. Simultaneously, Trảng Bom township became the capital Thống Nhất district.
- Divide Hố Nai 4 into 3 communes: Bắc Sơn, Bình Minh and Quảng Tiến

On August 21, 2003, the Government issued Decree No. 97/2003/NĐ-CP on the establishment of Long Khánh District-level town and its subordinate wards and communes; and the establishment of Cẩm Mỹ and Trảng Bom districts in Đồng Nai province. Accordingly, Trảng Bom district was established by separating Trảng Bom town and 16 communes: Hố Nai 3, Bắc Sơn, Bình Minh, Quảng Tiến, Sông Trầu, Tây Hòa, Trung Hòa, Đông Hòa, Hưng Thịnh, Sông Thao, Bàu Hàm, Giang Điền, An Viễn, Đồi 61, Cây Gáo, Thanh Bình of the former Thống Nhất district. Since then, Trảng Bom town and the communes of Sông Trầu, Quảng Tiến và Giang Điền are under Trảng Bom district. Then, Trảng Bom is also the capital of the newly established Trảng Bom district.

On 27 May 2019, Ministry of Construction established Decision No. 447/QĐ-BXD to recognize the expanded Trảng Bom town, encompassing the entire current Trảng Bom town and parts of the communes of Đồi 61, Sông Trầu, and Quảng Tiến, is recognized as a Class IV urban area.

On June 16 2025, the Standing Committee of the National Assembly of Vietnam established Resolution No. 1662/NQ-UBTVQH15 regarding the reorganization of commune-level administrative units in Đồng Nai province in 2025, the entire natural area and population of Trảng Bom town with the communes of Sông Trầu, Quảng Tiến, and Giang Điền (Trảng Bom district) will be reorganized into a new administrative division named Trảng Bom commune.

On April 17, 2026, the Standing Committee of the National Assembly issued Resolution No. 237/NQ-UBTVQH on the rearrangement of commune-level administrative units in Đồng Nai province (the resolution takes effect from April 30, 2026). Accordingly, Trảng Bom ward was established based on the entire natural area and population size of the former Trảng Bom commune.

== Divisions ==
Ward of Trảng Bom is divided into quarters and hamlets, including: Quarters 1, 2, 3, 4, 5, Quảng Biên, Quảng Hòa, Quảng Lộc, Quảng Phát, Đoàn Kết, Hòa Bình, Bảo Vệ, Độc Lập, Xây Dựng and Hamlets 1, 2, 3, 4, 5, 6, 7, 8.

== Notable places ==
- Giang Điền falls
