= Battle of Xuân Lộc =

Last major battle of the Vietnam War (1975)

- Part of the 1975 spring offensive in the Vietnam War
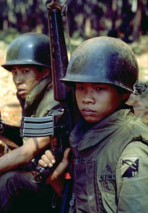
- ARVN 18th Division soldiers at Xuân Lộc
Date	9–21 April 1975 (1 week and 5 days)
Location	Xuân Lộc, Biên Hòa Province, South Vietnam 10°55′24″N 107°14′21″E
Result	North Vietnamese victory

Belligerents
North Vietnam	South Vietnam

Commanders and leaders
(Vietnam) Hoàng Cầm	(South Vietnam) Nguyễn Văn Toàn (South Vietnam) Lê Minh Đảo

Strength
Total forces: 40,000; At Xuân Lộc: at least 20,000	Total forces: about 25,000–30,000; At Xuân Lộc: at least 12,000

Casualties and losses
American estimate: 5,000 dead and wounded PAVN claim (only 4th Corps): 460 dead and 1,428 wounded	PAVN claim: 2,036 dead and wounded, 2,731 captured
- Location within Vietnam

The Battle of Xuân Lộc (Vietnamese: Trận Xuân Lộc) was the last major battle of the Vietnam War that took place at Xuân Lộc, Biên Hòa Province (today Đồng Nai Province). Over a period of 12 days between 9 and 21 April 1975, the outnumbered South Vietnamese attempted to stop the North Vietnamese forces from overrunning the town and breaking through towards South Vietnam's capital, Saigon. The Army of the Republic of Vietnam (ARVN) committed almost all their remaining mobile forces, especially the 18th Division, under Brigadier general Lê Minh Đảo, to the defence of the strategic crossroads town of Xuân Lộc, hoping to stall the People's Army of Vietnam (PAVN) advance. The battle ended when the town of Xuân Lộc was captured by the PAVN 4th Army Corps led by Major general Hoàng Cầm.

From the beginning of 1975, PAVN forces swept through the northern provinces of South Vietnam virtually unopposed. In the Central Highlands, the ARVN II Corps was completely destroyed, whilst attempting to evacuate to the coast. In the cities of Huế and Da Nang, ARVN units simply dissolved without putting up resistance. The devastating defeats suffered by the ARVN prompted South Vietnam's National Assembly to question President Nguyễn Văn Thiệu's handling of the war, thereby placing him under tremendous pressure to resign.

The ARVN III Corps' last defensive line east of Saigon connected the city of Bình Dương, Bien Hoa Air Base, Vũng Tàu, Long An and the lynchpin centered on the strategic town of Xuân Lộc, where the South Vietnamese Joint General Staff (JGS) committed the nation's final reserve forces in Saigon's defense. In the last-ditch effort to save South Vietnam, Thiệu ordered the 18th Infantry Division to hold Xuân Lộc at all costs. The PAVN, on the other hand, was ordered to capture Xuân Lộc in order to open the gateway to Saigon. During the initial stages of the battle, the 18th Division managed to beat off early attempts by the PAVN to capture the town, forcing PAVN commanders to change their battle plan. However, on 19 April 1975, Đảo's forces were ordered to withdraw after Xuân Lộc was almost completely isolated, with all remaining units badly mauled. This defeat also marked the end of Thiệu's political career, as he resigned on 21 April 1975.

Once Xuân Lộc fell, the PAVN battled with the last remaining elements of III Corps Armored Task Force, remnants of the 18th Infantry Division and depleted Marine, Airborne and Ranger Battalions in a fighting retreat that lasted nine days, until they reached Saigon and PAVN armored columns crashed through the gates of South Vietnam's Presidential Palace on 30 April 1975, effectively ending the war.

== Background ==
In the first half of 1975, the government of South Vietnam was in deep political turmoil, which reflected the military situation on the battlefield. At least two assassination attempts specifically targeting Thiệu were foiled. On 23 January an ARVN officer tried to shoot Thiệu with his pistol but failed. The officer was subsequently tried by a military court. On 4 April a Republic of Vietnam Air Force (RVNAF) pilot Nguyen Thanh Trung bombed the Independence Palace with his F-5 Tiger. It later turned out that the pilot had been an undercover member of the Viet Cong since 1969. Following those failed assassination attempts, Thiệu grew suspicious of his own military commanders.

On 2 April, the South Vietnamese Senate recommended the formation of a new government with Nguyễn Bá Cẩn as the new leader. As a result, Prime Minister Trần Thiện Khiêm resigned from his position. Thiệu, in response to the Senate's recommendations, immediately approved Tran Thien Kiem's resignation and swore in Nguyễn Bá Cẩn as the new Prime Minister. On 4 April, while announcing the changes of government on Saigon television, Thiệu also ordered the arrest of three army commanders: Major general Phạm Văn Phú for the loss of Ban Me Thuot, General Phạm Quốc Thuần for his failure to hold Nha Trang and Lieutenant general Dư Quốc Đống for the loss of Phước Long. General Ngô Quang Trưởng, commander of I Corps, was spared as he was undergoing medical treatment.

During a meeting with the Chief of Staff of the United States Army, General Frederick C. Weyand on 3 April, Thiệu outlined his strategy to defend South Vietnam, vowing to hold what was left of his country. In his strategy, Thiệu decided that Xuân Lộc would be the center of his country's resistance, together with Tây Ninh and Phan Rang on either side. Eventually, the meeting became more intense when Thiệu produced a letter written by former U.S. President Richard Nixon, which promised military retaliation against North Vietnam if they violated the terms of the Paris Peace Accords. The meeting then concluded with Thiệu accusing the United States Government of selling out his country the moment they signed the Paris Peace Accords.

In contrast to the situation faced by their opponents in Saigon, the North Vietnamese government were buoyed by the victories achieved by their armies since December 1974. By 8 April 1975, the PAVN had captured all of South Vietnam's I and II Corps, as well as Phước Long Province. While the South Vietnamese forces were disintegrating all over the country, North Vietnam had two army corps moving towards the last South Vietnamese stronghold at Xuân Lộc. The PAVN 4th Army Corps, which overran Phước Long several months earlier, approached Xuân Lộc from the north-east after they captured Tây Ninh, Bình Long and Long Khánh. The 3rd Army Corps, moved towards Xuân Lộc from the north-west after they defeated the ARVN in the Central Highlands. Xuân Lộc was at the crossroads of Highway 1 (which ran the length of South Vietnam) and Highway 20 (which ran from the Central Highlands through Da Lat) and it controlled the eastern approach to the huge military bases at Bien Hoa/Long Binh and then Saigon.

== Order of battle ==
=== South Vietnam ===
On 8 April 1975, the ARVN 18th Division was the main unit defending Xuân Lộc, composed of three infantry regiments: the 43rd, 48th and 52nd. There were also five armored brigades, four regional force battalions (340th, 342nd, 343rd and 367th Battalions), two artillery units (181st and 182nd Artillery Battalions) equipped with a total of forty-two artillery guns, and two companies of the People's Self-Defense Force. On 12 April Xuân Lộc was reinforced with the 1st Airborne Brigade, three armoured brigades (315th, 318th and 322nd Armored Brigades), the 8th Task Force from the 5th Division and the 33rd Ranger Battalion. Air support came in the form of two RVNAF divisions; the 5th Air Force Division based at Bien Hoa Air Base, and the 3rd Air Force Division at Tan Son Nhut Air Base. The commander at Xuân Lộc was Brigadier general Lê Minh Đảo.

=== North Vietnam ===
As the PAVN 4th Army Corps was the first PAVN formation to arrive at Xuân Lộc, the PAVN Central Military Committee decided that it would lead the assault. The 4th Army Corps fielded three divisions (6th, 7th and 341st Infantry Divisions). Those divisions had support from the 71st Anti-Aircraft Regiment, two combat engineering regiments (24th and 25th Engineering Regiments), the 26th Communications Regiment, two armored battalions, two artillery battalions, and two Long Khánh provincial infantry battalions. On 3 April 1975, the 4th Army Corps Command came up with two options for attack; the first option would involve capturing all ARVN outposts in the surrounding areas and isolating the town center in the process; if the opportunity arose, the 4th Army Corps would launch a full frontal assault on the town center to capture all of Xuân Lộc. In the second option, if ARVN forces in Xuân Lộc did not have the strength to resist, the 4th Army Corps would strike directly at the town center using infantry units, with armored and artillery units in support.

== Prelude ==
In March 1975, as the PAVN 3rd Army Corps attacked Ban Me Thuot in the Central Highlands, the PAVN 4th Army Corps initiated their own operations against South Vietnamese forces in Tây Ninh and Bình Dương, in the southwestern regions of South Vietnam. Unlike in the previous three years, South Vietnamese defences around Tây Ninh and Bình Dương were significantly weakened due to a lack of manpower and resources. Even though Tây Ninh and Bình Dương did not play a significant role in the defensive posture of South Vietnam, large ARVN units made their way into those areas as a result of the early defeats in 1975. Tây Ninh became a refuge for elements of the ARVN 25th Division, four armored brigades and two Ranger battalions. Bình Dương hosted the ARVN 5th Division, one Ranger battalion and one armored brigade. To stop ARVN units from gathering in Tây Ninh and Bình Dương, and thereby regrouping for further resistance, the North Vietnamese decided to capture those regions.

The PAVN 4th Army Corps Command selected Dầu Tiếng–Chon Thanh as the first target for their operation, as it was the weakest point in the South Vietnamese defensive line in the north-west area. South Vietnam maintained four Regional Force (RF) battalions (35th, 304th, 312th and 352nd Battalions) totalling 2,600 soldiers in the area, along with one armored brigade and ten 105 mm artillery guns. The military zone of Dầu Tiếng–Chơn Thành was located adjacent to the three provinces of Tây Ninh, Bình Dương and Binh Long. The task of capturing Dầu Tiếng–Chon Thanh was entrusted to the PAVN 9th Infantry Division, whose strength were bolstered by the 16th Infantry Regiment, the 22nd Armored Battalion, one artillery battalion and one air-defence battalion. At 05:00 on 11 March the 9th Infantry Division commenced its attack on Dầu Tiếng. ARVN artillery positions in Rung Nan, Bau Don and Cha La were the primary targets of the 9th Infantry Division on the first day of the attack.

On the afternoon of 11 March, ARVN General Lê Nguyên Khang ordered the 345th Armored Squadron to move out from Bau Don to relieve the military zone of Dầu Tiếng, but they were defeated by the PAVN 16th Infantry Regiment at Suoi Ong Hung, and forced to retreat to their base. At the same time, ARVN artillery units at Bau Don and Rung Nan were subdued by elements of the 9th Infantry Division, so they were unable to return fire. By 13 March, the PAVN was in complete control of the Dầu Tiếng military zone. After three hours of fighting, the PAVN 9th Infantry Division also captured ARVN positions at Vuon Chuoi, Nga ba Sac, Cau Tau and Ben Cui. The ARVN 3rd Brigade had planned to retake Dầu Tiếng using elements of the 5th Division, but Thiệu ordered them to pull back and defend Truong Mit, Bau Don and Tây Ninh instead.

On 24 March, two regiments from the PAVN 9th Infantry Division, in coordination with two provincial infantry battalions from Bình Phước, attacked Chơn Thành with full force but were repeatedly driven back from the ARVN defensive lines. On 31 March, the PAVN 4th Army Corps sent the 273rd Regiment and one artillery battalion equipped with 15 artillery guns to bolster the 9th Infantry Division. Following the arrival of these reinforcements, the PAVN continued their assault on the military zone of Chơn Thành. South Vietnam responded by deploying the 3rd Armored Brigade to relieve Chơn Thành, but they were stopped by elements of the 9th Infantry Division along Route 13. To avoid destruction, all surviving members from the ARVN 31st Ranger Battalion retreated to Bau Don in the east. On 2 April, the PAVN captured Chơn Thành; they claimed to have killed 2,134 ARVN soldiers, as well as capturing 472, and to have shot down 16 aircraft. In addition, North Vietnam captured 30 military vehicles (including eight tanks) and about 1,000 guns (including five artillery pieces) of various kinds. With the province of Binh Long firmly in their hands, the PAVN then set their sights on Xuân Lộc.

== Battle ==
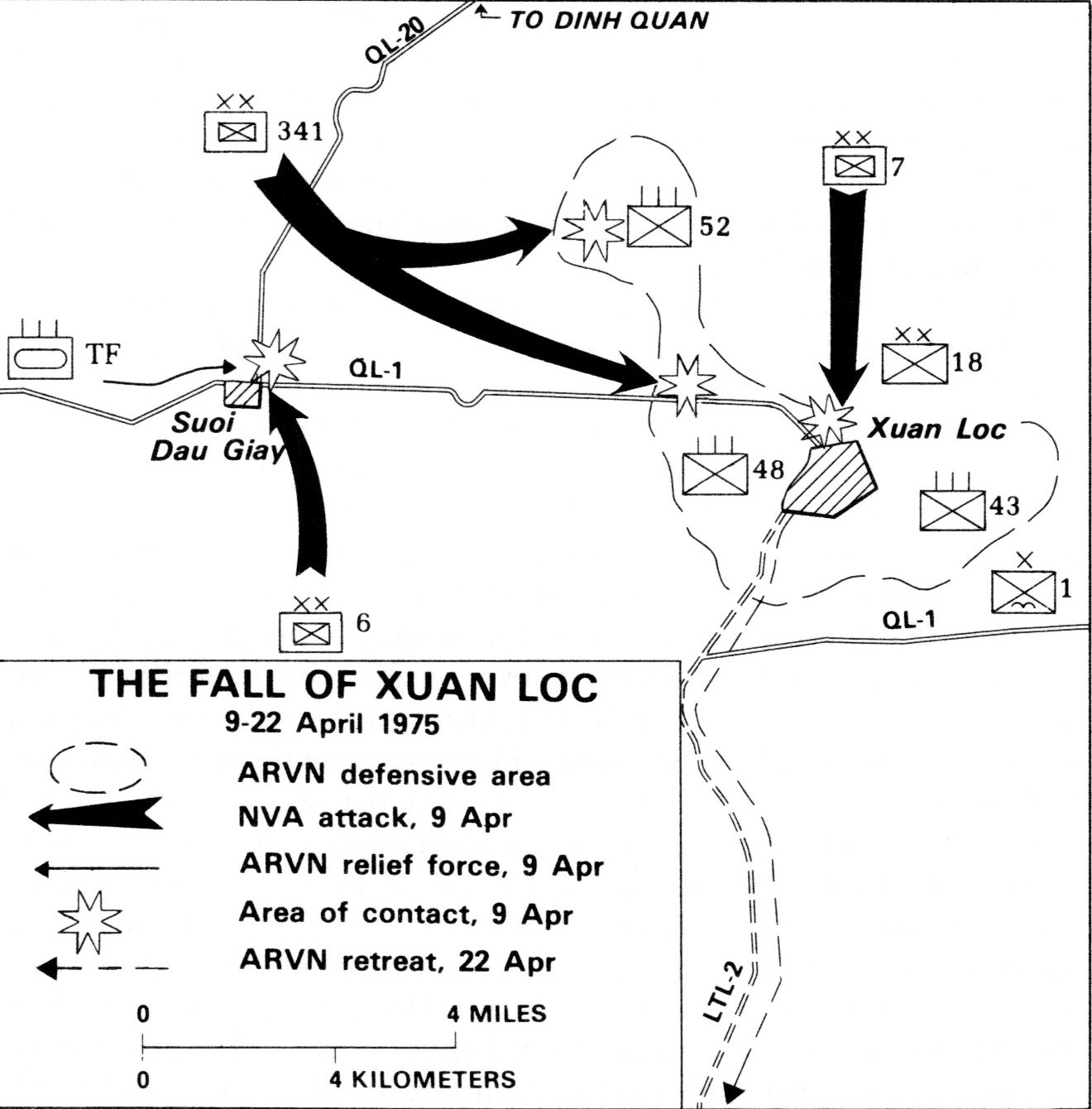
Movement of North and South Vietnamese forces

The PAVN began their Long Khánh-Bình Tuy campaign with strong attacks against ARVN positions on the two principal lines of communication in the region, Highways 1 and 20, striking outposts, towns, bridges and culverts north and east of Xuân Lộc. On 17 March, the PAVN 209th Infantry Regiment and the 210th Artillery Regiment, 7th Division, opened what was to become the Battle of Xuân Lộc. The 209th struck first at Định Quán, north of Xuân Lộc, and at the La Nga bridge, west of Định Quán. Eight tanks supported the initial assault on Định Quán and PAVN artillery fire destroyed four 155 mm howitzers supporting the RF. Anticipating the attack, Đảo had reinforced the La Nga bridge the day before, but the intense fire forced a withdrawal from the bridge. After repeated assaults, the 209th Infantry penetrated Định Quán and the 2nd Battalion, 43rd Infantry, as well as the RF battalion were forced to withdraw with heavy losses on 18 March.

Also on 17 March, the 3rd Battalion, 43rd Regiment killed 10 PAVN in heavy fighting northwest of Hoai Duc. At the same time another outpost of Xuân Lộc District, Ong Don, defended by an RF company and an artillery platoon, came under artillery and infantry attack. The PAVN assault was repulsed with heavy losses on both sides, and another RF company, sent to reinforce, ran into strong resistance on Highway 1 west of Ong Don. North of Ong Don, Gia Ray on Route 333 was under attack by the PAVN 274th Infantry Regiment, 6th Division. The 18th Division headquarters therefore realized that two PAVN divisions, the 6th and the 7th, were committed in Long Khánh. While the battle raged at Gia Ray, another post on Highway 1 west of Ong Don came under attack. Meanwhile, a bridge and a culvert on Highway 1 on each side of the Route 332 junction were blown up by PAVN sappers. Thus, all ARVN forces east of Route 332 were isolated from Xuân Lộc by formidable obstacles and PAVN roadblocks. North from Xuân Lộc, on Route 20, hamlets along the road were occupied to varying degrees by PAVN soldiers, and the RF outpost far to the northeast near the Lam Dong boundary was overrun. Đảo decided to counterattack up Route 20 with his 52nd Regiment, minus one battalion but reinforced with the 5th Armored Cavalry Squadron from Tây Ninh Province. The regiment was ordered to clear the road as far as Định Quán, but the attack quickly stalled as it met heavy resistance well short of its objective.

Evidence of increasingly heavy PAVN commitments in Long Khánh flowed into III Corps headquarters in Bien Hoa. The PAVN 141st Regiment, 7th Infantry Division had apparently participated in the attack on Định Quán. Hoai Duc was overrun by the PAVN 812th Regiment, 6th Infantry Division, while that division's other two regiments, the 33rd and 274th, seized Gia Ray. The ARVN outpost on the conical peak of Chua Chan, standing 2,200 ft (670 m) above Xuân Lộc and providing excellent observation, also fell to PAVN 6th Infantry Division forces and Xuân Lộc itself began to receive artillery fire, including 105 mm fire. III Corps commander Lieutenant general Nguyễn Văn Toàn responded to the burgeoning threat on his eastern flank first by sending the 5th Armored Cavalry Squadron and then one battalion of the 48th Regiment from Tây Ninh to Long Khánh. The rest of the 48th Regiment was still heavily engaged near Go Dau Ha. The 3rd Battalion made contact with a PAVN company west of the Vàm Cỏ Đông River on 17 March, killed 36, and captured a number of weapons. On 26 March, Toàn sent the headquarters and two battalions of the 48th Regiment to reinforce Khiem Hanh.

After capturing all key objectives surrounding Xuân Lộc in Long Khánh Province, the PAVN 4th Army Corps spent four days preparing for the final push against the ARVN 18th Division. PAVN Major general Hoàng Cầm personally took control of the operation; he decided to launch a full-frontal assault on Xuân Lộc using his infantry, tank and artillery units from the north and northwest. Colonel Bui Cat Vu, deputy commander of the 4th Army Corps, would direct operations from the east. While the PAVN were closing in on Xuân Lộc, Đảo and the chief of Long Khánh Province, Colonel Nguyen Van Phuc, were also busy lining up their units in anticipation of the PAVN onslaught. Prior to the battle, Đảo told foreign media that: "I am determined to hold Xuân Lộc. I don't care how many divisions the Communist will send against me, I will smash them all! The world shall see the strength and skill of the Army of the Republic of Vietnam".

On 1 April, Toàn returned the headquarters and two battalions of the 48th Regiment to the 18th Division. The regiment moved to the Xuân Lộc area but sent its 2nd Battalion to Hàm Tân District on the coast of Bình Tuy Province to secure the city and port. Large numbers of refugees poured into the province from the north. About 500 troops, survivors of the ARVN 2nd Division, were among those arriving from I Corps. When reorganized and reequipped, they would take over the security mission in Hàm Tân. The 52nd Regiment meanwhile was pressing forward on Route 20 south of Định Quán and in sharp fighting on 1 April killed over 50 PAVN troops. The 43rd Regiment was fighting east along Highway 1, near Xuân Lộc and in contact with a major PAVN force.

After the first PAVN attempt to seize Xuân Lộc had been repulsed, the PAVN began a second assault on the town. At 05:40 on 9 April 1975, the PAVN 4th Army Corps began bombarding South Vietnamese positions around Xuân Lộc firing about 4,000 rounds, in one of the heaviest artillery bombardments of the war. North of the town, the PAVN 341st Infantry Division captured the ARVN communications center and the local police station after more than an hour of heavy fighting. However, all PAVN units moving down from the north were forced to stop when elements of the ARVN 52nd Task Force counter-attacked from the south. From the east, the PAVN 7th Infantry Division advanced on ARVN positions without tank support, so they sustained heavy casualties in the initial stages of the fighting. At 08:00, the 4th Army Corps Command sent eight tanks to support the 7th Infantry Division, but three were destroyed by entrenched ARVN soldiers at Bao Chanh A. By midday, the PAVN 209th and 270th Infantry Regiments captured the 18th Division headquarters and the Governor's Residence, which was defended by the ARVN 43rd and 48th Infantry Regiments, setting ablaze seven ARVN tanks in the process. In the south, the PAVN 6th Infantry Division attacked ARVN positions on Highway 1 from Hung Nghia to Me Bong Con, where they destroyed 11 tanks from the ARVN 322nd Armored Brigade. Throughout the day on 9 April, the 18th Division staged counter-attacks on the PAVN flanks to slow down their momentum, especially movements from the north and northwest.

The PAVN resumed the attack on 10 April, this time committing the 165th Regiment of the 7th Infantry Division along with regiments of the 6th and 341st Divisions; again the attack failed. West of Xuân Lộc, between Trảng Bom and the intersection of Highways 1 and 20, the ARVN 322nd Task Force and 1st Airborne Brigade (two battalions) were trying to force their way east against stiff resistance. The PAVN attacked the rear base of the 52nd Regiment on Route 20, the 43rd Infantry in Xuân Lộc and the 82nd Ranger Battalion on 11 April, the third day of the battle. At that time the battalion of the 48th Regiment securing Hàm Tân went back to Xuân Lộc and the 1st Airborne Brigade moved in closer to the town. Task Force 322 was making very slow progress opening the road from Trảng Bom to Xuân Lộc and Toàn ordered Task Force 315 from Cu Chi to reinforce it.

On 12 April, the battalions of the 52nd Regiment were still engaged in heavy fighting north of Xuân Lộc, but the town, although demolished, was still held by the 43rd Regiment. PAVN losses to that point were probably in excess of 800 killed, five captured, 300 weapons captured and 11 T-54 tanks destroyed. ARVN casualties had been moderate. Most of the 43rd Regiment was holding east of the town; the 48th was southwest; the 1st Airborne Brigade was south but moving north toward the 82nd Ranger Battalion; and the 322 Task Force was on Route 1 west of the Route 20 junction attacking toward Xuân Lộc. Two resupply missions were flown into the besieged town; on 12 April CH-47 helicopters brought in 93 tons of artillery ammunition and followed with 100 tons the next day. Meanwhile, RVNAF airplanes flying against intense antiaircraft fire, took a heavy toll on the PAVN divisions around Xuân Lộc flying over 200 sorties. At 14:00 on 12 April, RVNAF C-130 Hercules dropped two BLU-82 bombs on PAVN positions in the town of Xuan Vinh, close to Xuân Lộc, killing about 200 PAVN soldiers. The JGS made the decision to bolster the defences at Xuân Lộc with units drawn from the general reserve. Subsequently, the ARVN 1st Airborne Brigade arrived at the Bao Dinh rubber plantation, while two Marine battalions defended the eastern corridor leading to Bien Hoa. In addition, Tan Phong and Dau Giay received reinforcements from the 33rd Ranger Battalion, 8th Battalion, 5th Division, 8th Artillery Battalion and three armored brigades (315th, 318th and 322nd Armored Brigades). As the reinforcements were making their way onto the battlefield, RVNAF fighter-bombers from Bien Hoa and Tan Son Nhat flew between 80 and 120 combat sorties per day to support the defenders at Xuân Lộc.

On 13 April, Lieutenant General Trần Văn Trà arrived at the headquarters of the 4th Army Corps. During the meeting with other commanders, Trà decided to alter certain aspects of the attack; the 6th Infantry Division and elements of the 341st Infantry Division would attack Dau Giay, which was the weakest point in the defensive line around Xuân Lộc, set up blocking positions along Highway 2 leading to Bà Rịa–Vũng Tàu, and along Highway 1 between Xuân Lộc and Bien Hoa. On the same day, the PAVN 2nd Army Corps ordered the 95B Infantry Regiment to join the 4th Army Corps in its efforts to capture Xuân Lộc. As PAVN commanders began to implement their new strategy, the South Vietnamese military declared it had successfully repulsed the attack on Xuân Lộc, thereby ending a period of continuous defeats. Thiệu, buoyed by the fierce resistance of his army at Xuân Lộc, announced that the ARVN had "recovered its fighting ability" to defend the country. The new attack began at 04:50 against the headquarters and 1st Battalion, 43rd Regiment, and lasted until 09:30. When the PAVN withdrew, they left 235 dead and about 30 weapons on the field. The attack picked up again at midday and lasted until 15:00, but the 43rd, with heavy RVNAF support, held. Meanwhile, the 1st Airborne Brigade continued to attack north toward Xuân Lộc and Task Force 322, now reinforced by the 315th and 316th Task Forces, struck from the west. RVNAF observers had discovered two batteries of 130 mm guns northeast of Xuân Lộc and attacked them. The PAVN continued sending additional forces into III Corps with the 320B and 325th Divisions moving to Long Khánh where they entered the battle on 15 April.

On 15 April, the situation on the battlefield began to change as PAVN artillery stopped their shelling of Xuân Lộc, but started pounding Bien Hoa Air Base instead. In just one day, the RVNAF 3rd Air Force Division at Bien Hoa was forced to cease all operations due to continuous PAVN artillery bombardments. To continue their support of ground troops at Xuan Loc, the RVNAF mobilised the 4th Air Force Division based at Binh Thuy Air Base to conduct further missions. On the same day, an artillery bombardment of 1,000 rounds fell on the headquarters and 3rd Battalion, 52nd Regiment, an artillery battalion, and elements of the 5th Armored Cavalry Squadron, four 155 mm and eight 105 mm howitzers were destroyed, and the PAVN 6th Infantry Division and the 95B Infantry Regiment defeated a combined ARVN formation which included the 52nd Task Force and the 13th Armored Squadron west of Xuân Lộc. On 16 and 17 April, the PAVN 6th Infantry Division and the 95B Infantry Regiment defeated the ARVN 8th Task Force and 3rd Armored Brigade, when the ARVN tried to recapture the military zone of Dau Giay. Around Xuân Lộc, the ARVN 43rd and 48th Infantry Regiments, as well as the 1st Airborne Brigade, suffered heavy casualties as PAVN infantry units attacked them from all sides. The armored task forces on Route 1 had to pull back; half of their equipment had been destroyed. The 1st Airborne Brigade, frustrated in its attack toward Xuân Lộc, withdrew through the plantations and jungles toward Bà Rịa in Phước Tuy Province.

With Dau Giay and all the main roads under PAVN control, Xuân Lộc was completely isolated, the 18th Division was cut off from reinforcements and surrounded by the PAVN 4th Army Corps. On 19 April, the JGS ordered Đảo to evacuate the 18th Division and other support units from Xuân Lộc to a new defensive line formed east of Bien Hoa at the town of Trảng Bom which was defended by the remnants of the Division, the 468th Marine Brigade and the reconstituted 258th Marine Brigade. On 20 April, under the cover of heavy rain, South Vietnamese soldiers and civilians began pulling out from Xuân Lộc, in a convoy of about 200 military vehicles. On 21 April, Xuân Lộc was completely abandoned, with the ARVN 1st Airborne Brigade being the last unit to be evacuated from the area. At 04:00 on 21 April, the 3rd Battalion, 1st Airborne Brigade was completely destroyed by the PAVN at the hamlet of Suoi Ca. By the end of the day Xuân Lộc was under North Vietnamese control and the gateway to Saigon was open.

== Aftermath ==
=== Military outcome ===
The Xuân Lộc victory monument dedicated to the People's Army of Vietnam

Following their costly victory at Xuân Lộc, the PAVN effectively controlled two-thirds of South Vietnam's territory. The loss of Xuân Lộc dealt a severe blow to the military strength of South Vietnam, which had lost almost every unit from its general reserve. On 18 April 1975, III Corps commander Toàn, informed Thiệu that the South Vietnamese forces at Xuân Lộc had been beaten and South Vietnam's armed forces could only hold out for a few more days as a result of their losses on the battlefield. According to North Vietnam's official account of the battle, about 2,036 South Vietnamese soldiers were either killed or wounded and another 2,731 were captured. Total casualties on the North Vietnamese side are unknown, but the 4th Army Corps alone claimed to have suffered 460 killed in action, and another 1,428 wounded. While Đảo claimed that the battle cost the PAVN over 50,000 killed and 370 tanks destroyed, American estimates only put PAVN casualties at around 10 percent of those figures with 5,000 troops killed or wounded and 37 tanks destroyed.

=== Political outcome ===
In the days following the loss of Xuân Lộc, there was still much debate in both houses of South Vietnam's National Assembly about the country's wartime policies. Pro-war elements in the National Assembly argued South Vietnam should fight until the very end, in the belief that the United States would eventually give the country the necessary aid to resist the North Vietnamese. Anti-war elements, on the other hand, strongly opposed the idea. They believed the Government should negotiate with the North Vietnamese, in order to avoid a catastrophic defeat. Despite their differences of opinion, members in both houses of South Vietnam's National Assembly agreed that Thiệu should be held responsible for the country's dire military and political situation, because his policies had allowed the North Vietnamese to easily penetrate South Vietnam's military defences.

Finally at 20:00 on 21 April 1975, Thiệu officially resigned as the president of the Republic of Vietnam upon learning that Xuân Lộc had fallen that morning. In his final effort to save South Vietnam, Thiệu gambled his political career by sending the last units of the ARVN to Xuân Lộc in an attempt to hold off the PAVN. Ultimately, however, Thiệu's effort came too late. Trần Văn Hương was appointed president, and he was ordered by the National Assembly to seek a negotiated peace with North Vietnam at any cost, to the disappointment of many in South Vietnam's political elite, who argued that the situation could have been different if Thiệu had gone earlier.
