= Long Khánh province =

Historic province of Vietnam

Long Khánh is former province in the Southeast Region (Đông Nam Bộ region) of former South Vietnam. It was established on October 22, 1956, by separating from Biên Hòa province.

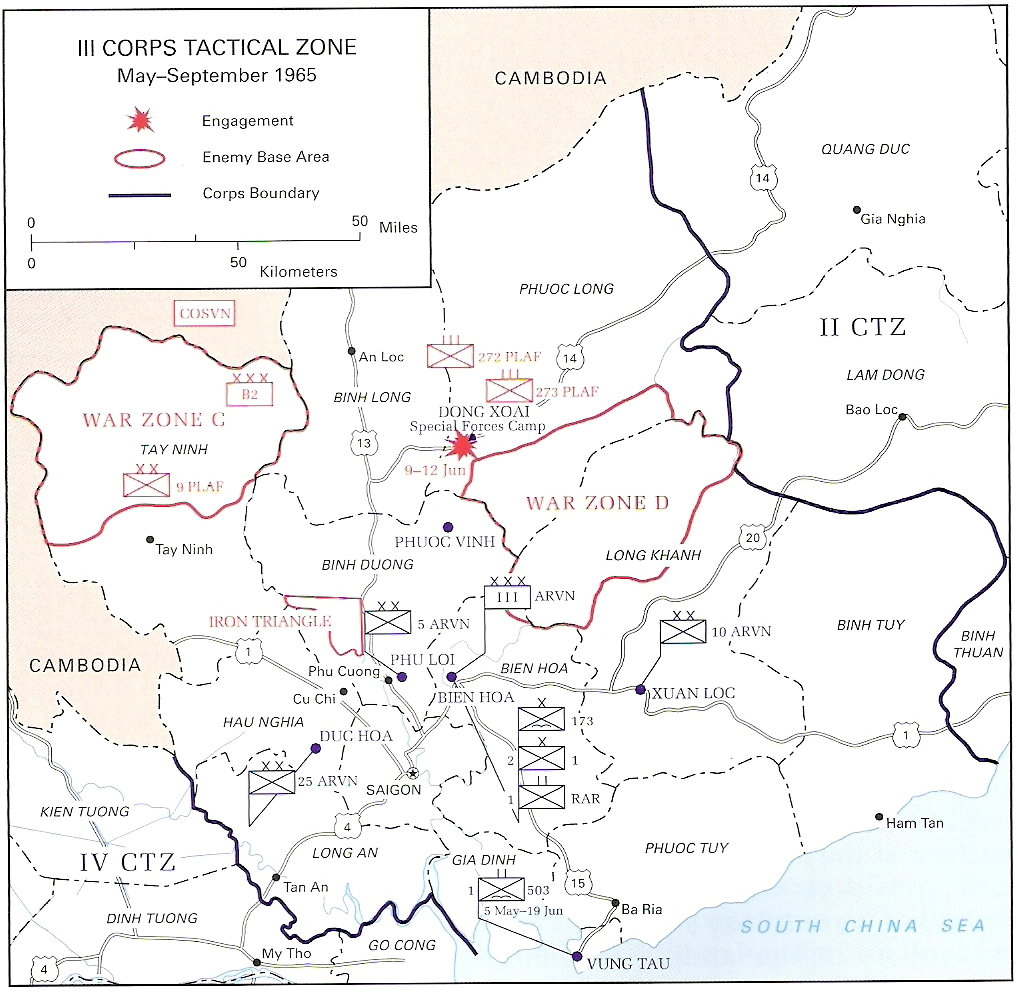
III CTZ May to September 1965

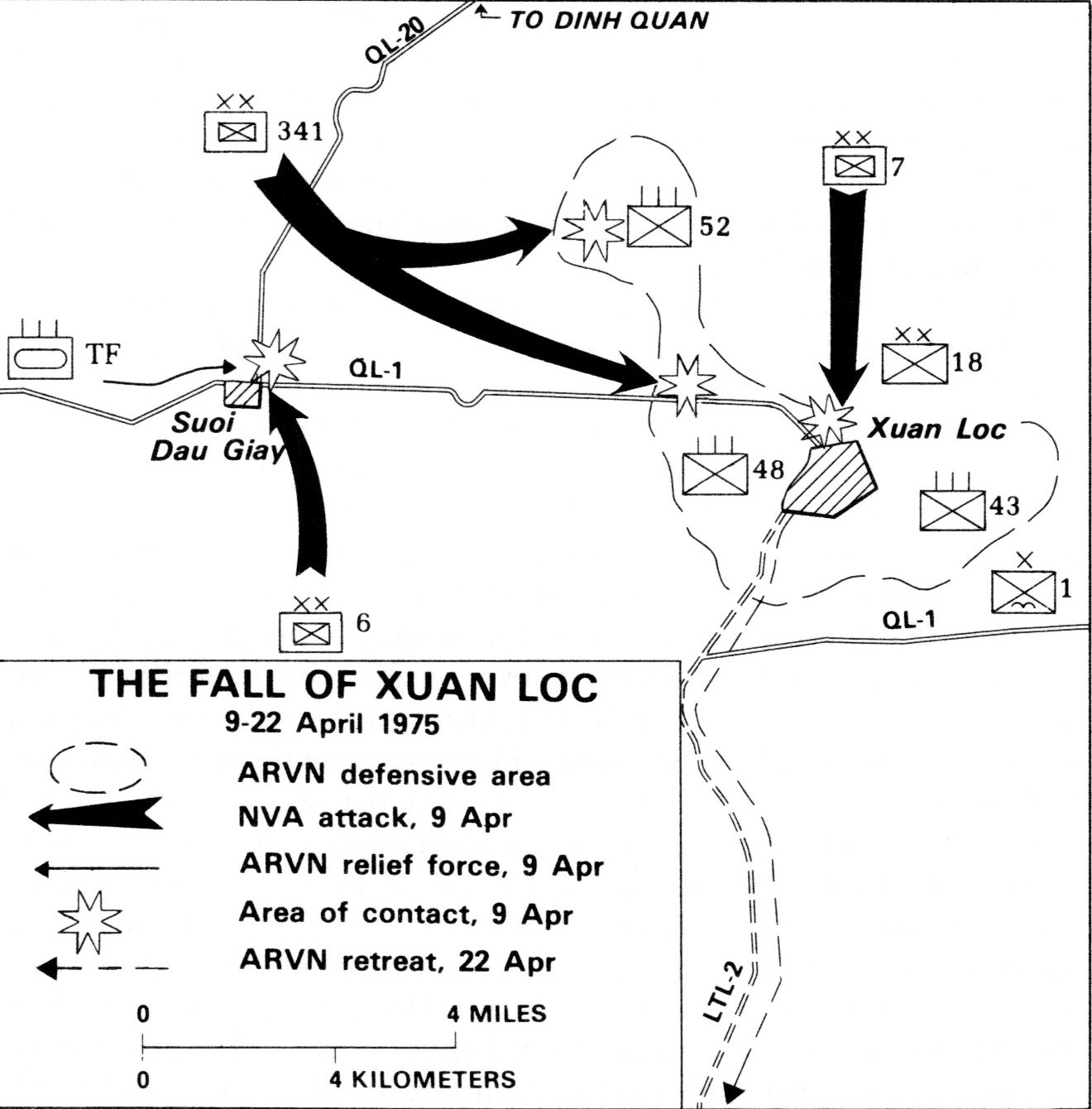
The battle of Xuân Lộc

On April 24, 1957, it had two districts established, Xuân Lộc District and Định Quán District.

During Republic of Vietnam period, Long Khánh hosted the ARVN 18th Infantry Division Headquarters in its northern district of Xuân Lộc and a half of the Viet Cong War Zone D in its southern district of Định Quán.

In 1975, Long Khánh's capital town of Xuân Lộc was the main site of the Battle of Xuân Lộc – the last large battle of the ARVN against the PAVN before the Fall of Saigon.

On April 30, 1975, the province was renamed Đồng Nai province, within newly unified Vietnam.
