= Phước Bình (disambiguation) =

Phước Bình may refer to several places in Vietnam:

- Phước Bình, Đồng Nai, a rural commune of Đồng Nai
- Phước Bình, District 9, a former ward of District 9, Ho Chi Minh City
- Phước Bình, Bình Phước, a former ward of Phước Long
- Phước Bình, Tây Ninh, a former rural commune of Trảng Bàng
- Phước Bình, Ninh Thuận, a former rural commune of Bác Ái District
- Phước Bình National Park
- Former Phước Bình District, Sông Bé Province

== See also ==
- Bình Phước Province, in southern Vietnam
