= Long Khánh, Đồng Nai =

Long Khánh
- Ward
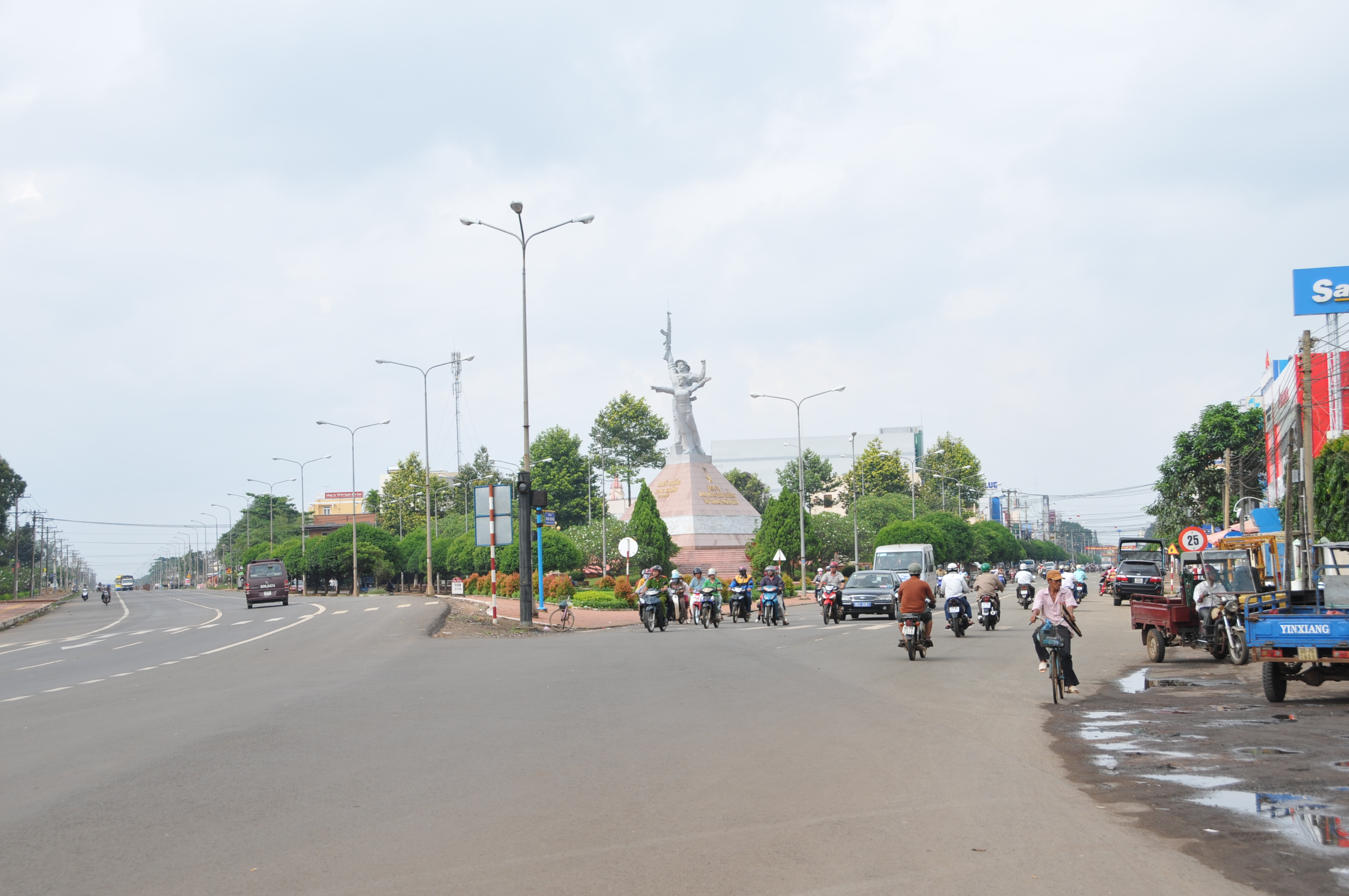
- Long Khánh Monument
- Interactive map of Long Khánh
- Coordinates: 10°55′47″N 107°14′54″E
- Country: Vietnam
- City: Đồng Nai
- Region: Southeast
- Established: 16 June 2025
- Seat: 53 Cách Mạng Tháng Tám, Khu phố 2

Area
  - Total: 21.32 km^{2} (8.23 sq mi)

Population (31 December 2025)
  - Total: 79,449
  - Density: 3,725/km^{2} (9,650/sq mi)
- Website: longkhanh.dongnai.gov.vn

Long Khánh is a ward in Đồng Nai, Vietnam. The ward inherited its name from the former Long Khánh city, Đồng Nai.

On 16 June 2025, the Standing Committee of the National Assembly of Vietnam adopted Resolution No. 1662/NQ-UBTVQH15 on the reorganization of commune-level administrative units in Đồng Nai. Under the resolution, the entire area and population of Xuân An, Xuân Bình, Xuân Hòa and Phú Bình wards and Bàu Trâm commune, all formerly part of Long Khánh city, were consolidated to form a new ward named Long Khánh.
