= Phước Long =

Phước Long may refer to several places in Vietnam, including:

- Phước Long, Ho Chi Minh City: a ward in the former Thủ Đức city (previously District 9)
- Phước Long, Đồng Nai: a ward of the former Phước Long town
- Phước Long, Cà Mau: a commune in the former Phước Long district, previously a township and district capital
- Phước Long, Vĩnh Long: a commune in the former Giồng Trôm district
- Phước Long province: a former province in South Vietnam
- Phước Long, Bình Phước: a former district-level town, dissolved in 2025 as part of the 2025 Vietnamese administrative reform
- Battle of Phước Long: a decisive battle in the Vietnam War
- Phước Long district, a district of Bạc Liêu province

== See also ==
- Long Phước (disambiguation)
