= Lê Minh Đảo =

South Vietnamese major general (1933–2020)

- Born: 5 March 1933; Gò Vấp District, Gia Định Province, Cochinchina, French Indochina
- Died: 19 March 2020 (aged 87) Connecticut, United States
- Allegiance: South Vietnam
- Branch: Vietnamese National Army; Army of the Republic of Vietnam
- Rank: Major general
- Commands: 21st Division; 18th Division
- Conflicts: Vietnam War: Battle of Xuân Lộc
- Awards: National Order of Vietnam, Commander

Lê Minh Đảo (5 March 1933 – 19 March 2020) was a Major general in the South Vietnamese Army of the Republic of Vietnam (ARVN). He commanded the 18th Division nicknamed "The Super Men", at Xuân Lộc, the last major battle of the Vietnam War.

== Early life ==
Lê Minh Đảo was born in the commune of Bình Hòa in Gia Định Province. He studied at Petrus Ký High School, in Saigon, completing his high school certificate in February 1952.

== Military career ==
In 1953, he joined up to the tenth intake of the Trần Bình Trọng course at the Vietnamese National Military Academy in Đà Lạt. In June 1954, he graduated and was commissioned as a 1st lieutenant, and served for a period immediately as an instructor at the military academy.

In early 1964 the Military Revolutionary Council appointed Đảo, then a major, to serve as Long An province chief. However he was replaced in February because Junta leader General Nguyễn Khánh considered him a supporter of General Duong Van Minh.

In March 1972 he was given command of the 18th Division replacing the incompetent Lâm Quang Thơ. He was promoted to Brigadier general in November 1972.

By April 1975, North Vietnamese forces were in full advance and most ARVN resistance had collapsed. Đảo's 18th Division, however, made a significant defence at the Battle of Xuân Lộc, 38 miles from Saigon. The fierce fighting raged for two weeks. The 18th Division, facing People's Army of Vietnam (PAVN) forces, managed to hold on for three weeks, and all but destroyed three PAVN divisions but was overwhelmed by 21 April 1975.

Đảo was famous for his emotional battlefield interview that was broadcast around the world during the fighting in which he stated that, "The communists could throw their entire Army at Xuân Lộc, the 18th will stand fast" and "I will keep Long Khánh, I will knock them down here even if they bring two divisions or three divisions!”. When pressed during the battle by Peter Arnett of the Associated Press about the hopeless situation, Đảo stated "Please tell the Americans you have seen how the 18th Division can fight and die. Now, please go!" According to Dirck Halstead, by the afternoon of 21 April, Đảo knew the battle was lost and fully expected to die before it was over.

At midday on 29 April III Corps commander Lieutenant general Nguyễn Văn Toàn met with Đảo, III Corps Armored Task Force commander Brigadier general Trần Quang Khôi and Marine deputy commander Colonel Nguyen Thanh Tri to discuss the close-in defense of Saigon. Toàn ordered Đảo to defend Long Binh Post, Khôi to defend Biên Hòa and the remaining two Marine brigades to be assigned to each of Đảo and Khôi.

Đảo was captured and sent by the new communist regime to spend 17 years in re-education camps. He was first sent to a camp in northern Vietnam, where he spent 12 years, before being transferred into the south for another five years.

== Later life ==
After his release in May 1992, Đảo received political asylum in the United States and settled there in April 1993, where he worked as restaurant manager before retiring.

One of his hobbies was composing songs. Along with Colonel Đỗ Trọng Huề, he composed the song Nhớ Mẹ (Remembering Mother), which was well known among imprisoned ARVN personnel in re-education camps.

He died in Connecticut in March 2020.

== Awards ==
- South Vietnam :
  - Commander of the National Order of Vietnam
  - Gallantry Cross With Palm
- USA :
  - Silver Star Medal
