= Vietnam National University of Forestry =

University in Vietnam

Vietnam National University of Forestry (VNUF) was established according to the Decision No.127/CP dated on August 19, 1964 by the Prime Minister of Vietnam.

Currently, there are over 16.000 students, including undergraduate and graduate, following 22 disciplines of undergraduate level, 6 majors of master level, and 4 majors of doctorate level. The main campus of VNUF is located in Xuan Mai Town, Chuong My District, Hanoi Capital. The second campus (established in 01/2008) is located in Trang Bom Town, Dong Nai Province.

== History ==
Historical background: Vietnam National University of Forestry (VNUF) was established according to the Decision No.127/CP dated on August 19, 1964 by the Prime Minister of Vietnam, and was separated from the Forestry Department - Hanoi University of Agriculture. From 1964 to 1984: The first campus of VNUF was located in the evacuated area of Dong Trieu district, Quang Ninh province. The task of VNUF was to train and provide human resources of undergraduate with three academic faculties and four majors of forestry. From 1984 until now: The main campus was located at Xuan Mai town, Chuong My district, Hanoi, becoming a university with diversified training and education activities to meet social needs and to fulfill the duty of national scientific technology The second campus (established in 01/2008) is located in Trang Bong Town, Dong Nai province, Vietnam that was upgraded from the Forestry College 2 - Ministry of Agriculture and Rural Development to meet the demand for human resources in forestry for the southern provinces of the country. Today VNUF activities expanded to five Academic Faculties with hundreds departments, 36 major subjects. Over the years, more than 1,000 masters, 150 doctors, over 10,000 undergraduate students, and 500 trainees with intermediate and primary level have graduated from VNUF. Likewise, the VNUF has helped establish more than 30 universities, training and research institutions in different countries, as well as international organizations.

== Facilities ==
VNUF has 160 hectares in the main campus and 20 hectares in the second branch for serving its training and science research purposes. 6 experimental centers with 58 labs for testing and practice, 10,800 m2 of classrooms, A library of 3,000 m2 with 150,000 books/textbooks and other electronic sources for reference. Nearly 100 ha of experimental forests for training and science research. 16 high buildings which provide accommodation with self-contained rooms for nearly 8,000 students. The sport areas and recreation centers including gymnasiums, outdoor swimming pool, sport ground, house of culture, etc., have the area of 20,000 m2.

== Organization structure ==
The Vietnam National University of Forestry has 3 organizational levels: a) Board of Leaders, b) Faculties & Administrative Divisions, and c) Organizations.

07 Faculties/Colleges 09 Administrative Divisions. 05 Research & Production Units. 01 Company of Consulting, Investment & Forestry Development (CIFOD).
