= An Lộc (disambiguation) =

An Lộc may refer to several places in Vietnam, including:

- An Lộc, Đồng Nai, is a ward of Đồng Nai
- An Lộc, Bình Phước, a former ward of Bình Long
- An Lộc, Đồng Tháp, a former ward of Hồng Ngự town
- An Lộc, Hà Tĩnh, a former commune of Lộc Hà District
