= Lộc An (disambiguation) =

Lộc An may refer to the following places in Vietnam:

- Lộc An, a commune of Huế
- Lộc An, Bà Rịa–Vũng Tàu, a former commune in Đất Đỏ District, Bà Rịa–Vũng Tàu Province
- Lộc An, Lâm Đồng, a former commune in Bảo Lâm District, Lâm Đồng Province
- Lộc An, Đồng Nai, a former commune in Long Thành District, Đồng Nai Province
- Lộc An, Bình Phước, a former commune in Lộc Ninh District, Bình Phước Province
- Lộc An, Nam Định, a former commune in Nam Định city, Nam Định Province

== See also ==
- An Lộc (disambiguation)
