= Phước Bình, Đồng Nai =

Phước Bình Phường Phước Bình
- Ward
- Interactive map of Phước Bình
- Coordinates: 11°49′12″N 106°56′23″E
- Country: Vietnam
- Municipality: Đồng Nai
- Established: June 16, 2025

Area
  - Total: 28.02 sq mi (72.57 km^{2})

Population (2024)
  - Total: 44,771
  - Density: 1,598/sq mi (616.9/km^{2})
- Time zone: UTC+07:00 (Indochina Time)
- Administrative code: 25220

Phước Bình (Vietnamese: Phường Phước Bình) is a ward of Đồng Nai, Vietnam. It is one of the 95 new wards, communes and special zones of the province following the reorganization in 2025.

== Administration ==
Phường Phước Bình is divided into 28 neighborhoods: 1, 2, 3, 4, 5, 6, 7, 8, 9, 10, An Lương, Bình Điền, Bình Minh, Bù Xiết, Long Điền 1, Long Điền 2, Long Giang, Long Phước, Nhơn Hòa 1, Nhơn Hòa 2, Phú Châu, Phước An, Phước Hiệp, Phước Sơn, Phước Trung, Phước Vĩnh, Sơn Hà 1, Sơn Hà 2.

== History ==
On June 16, 2025, the National Assembly Standing Committee issued Resolution No. 1662/NQ-UBTVQH15 on the arrangement of commune-level administrative units of Đồng Nai province in 2025 (effective from June 16, 2025). Accordingly, the entire land area and population of Long Phước, Phước Bình wards, Long Giang commune of the former Phước Long town and Bình Sơn commune of the former Phú Riềng district will be integrated into a new ward named Phước Bình (Clause 85, Article 1).
