= Lương Thế Vinh High School for the Gifted =

School in Tân Hiệp, Biên Hòa, Đồng Nai, Vietnam

Lương Thế Vinh High School for the Gifted, Đồng Nai
- Trường THPT Chuyên Lương Thế Vinh, Đồng Nai
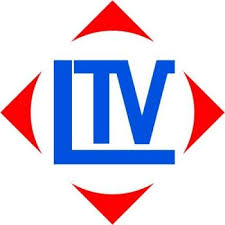

Location
- 2 Lê Quý Đôn; Tân Hiệp, Biên Hòa, Đồng Nai Province; Vietnam
- Coordinates: 10.95788°N 106.86315°E

Information
- Type: Public, Gifted, Advanced Curriculum
- Established: 1994
- Grades: 10, 11, 12
- Gender: Co-educational
- Average class size: 20
- Campus type: Urban
- School fees: No tuition fee
- Website: www.chuyenluongthevinh.edu.vn (Vietnamese)

Lương Thế Vinh High School for the Gifted (Vietnamese: Trường Trung học Phổ thông Chuyên Lương Thế Vinh) is a high school in Đồng Nai province, Vietnam. It was established in 1994 and named after Lương Thế Vinh.

The school offers advanced and specialized curriculum for gifted students who show their exceptional talents in the Natural Sciences, Social Sciences, and Humanities.

== History ==
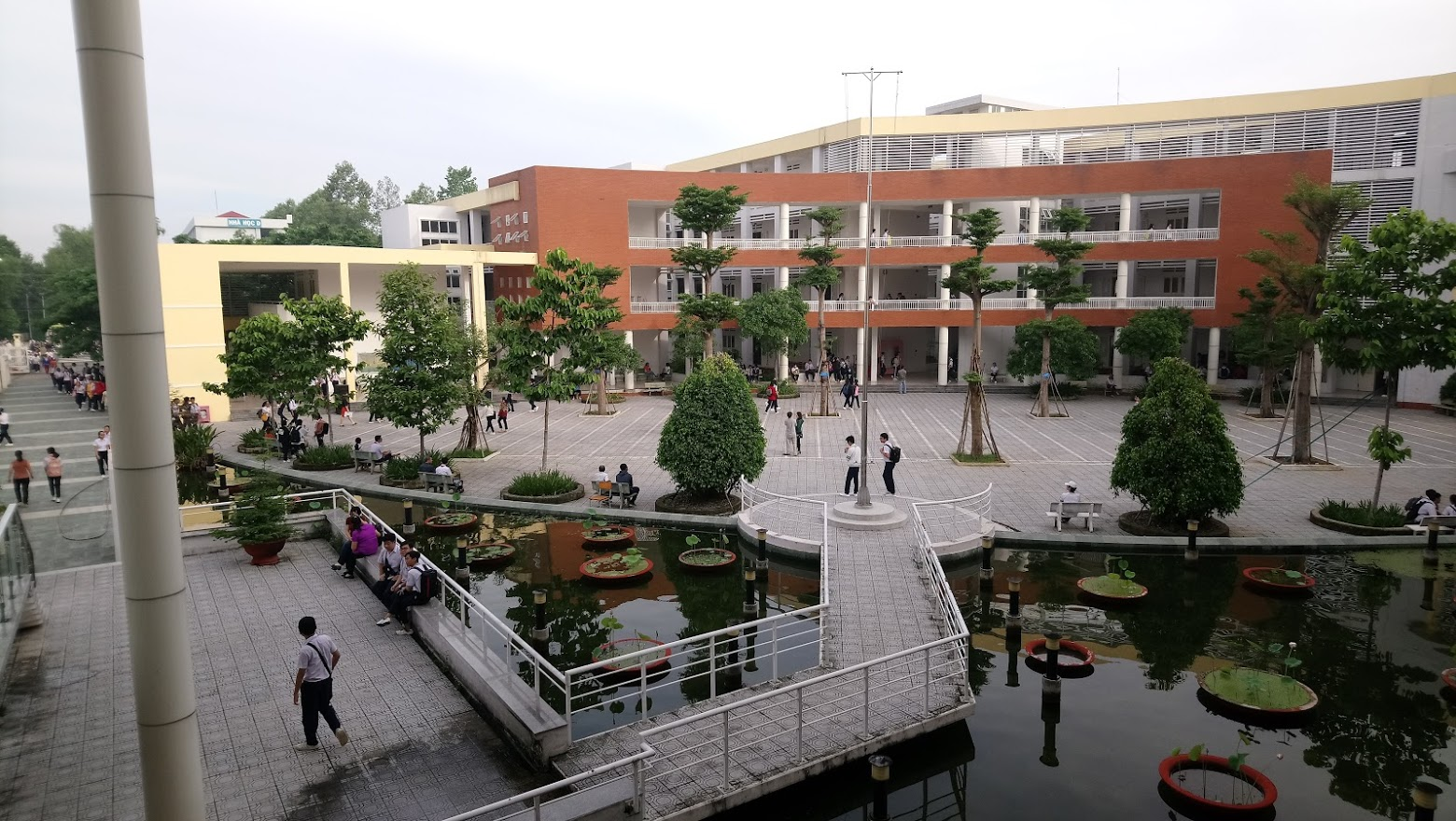
school campus

The school was established in 1994. For the first 3 years, it shared facilities with Ngo Quyen high school. Since 1997, it has had its own facilities, located in Tân Hiệp ward. In 2014, it was rebuilt.
