= Hố Nai =

- Ward
- Location in Vietnam
- Coordinates: 10°58′16″N 106°54′31″E
- Country: Vietnam
- Municipality: Đồng Nai

Area
  - Total: 1.5 sq mi (3.9 km^{2})

Population (2017)
  - Total: 39,982
- Time zone: UTC+7 (UTC+7)

Hố Nai is a ward located in Đồng Nai, Vietnam. It has an area of about 3.9km2 and the population in 2017 was 39,982.
