= Cẩm Mỹ district =

Coordinates: 10°50′10.07″N 107°14′5.63″E

Cẩm Mỹ district Huyện Cẩm Mỹ
- District
- Interactive map of Cẩm Mỹ district
- Country: Vietnam
- Region: Southeast
- Province: Đồng Nai
- Capital: Long Giao

Population (2019)
  - Total: 158,010
- Time zone: UTC+7 (Indochina Time)

Cẩm Mỹ is a former rural district of Đồng Nai province in the Southeast region of Vietnam. As of 2003 the district had a population of 148,823. The district covers an area of 468 km^{2} (181 sq mi). The district capital lies at Long Giao.
