= Phước Long, Đồng Nai =

Phước Long Phường Phước Long
- Ward
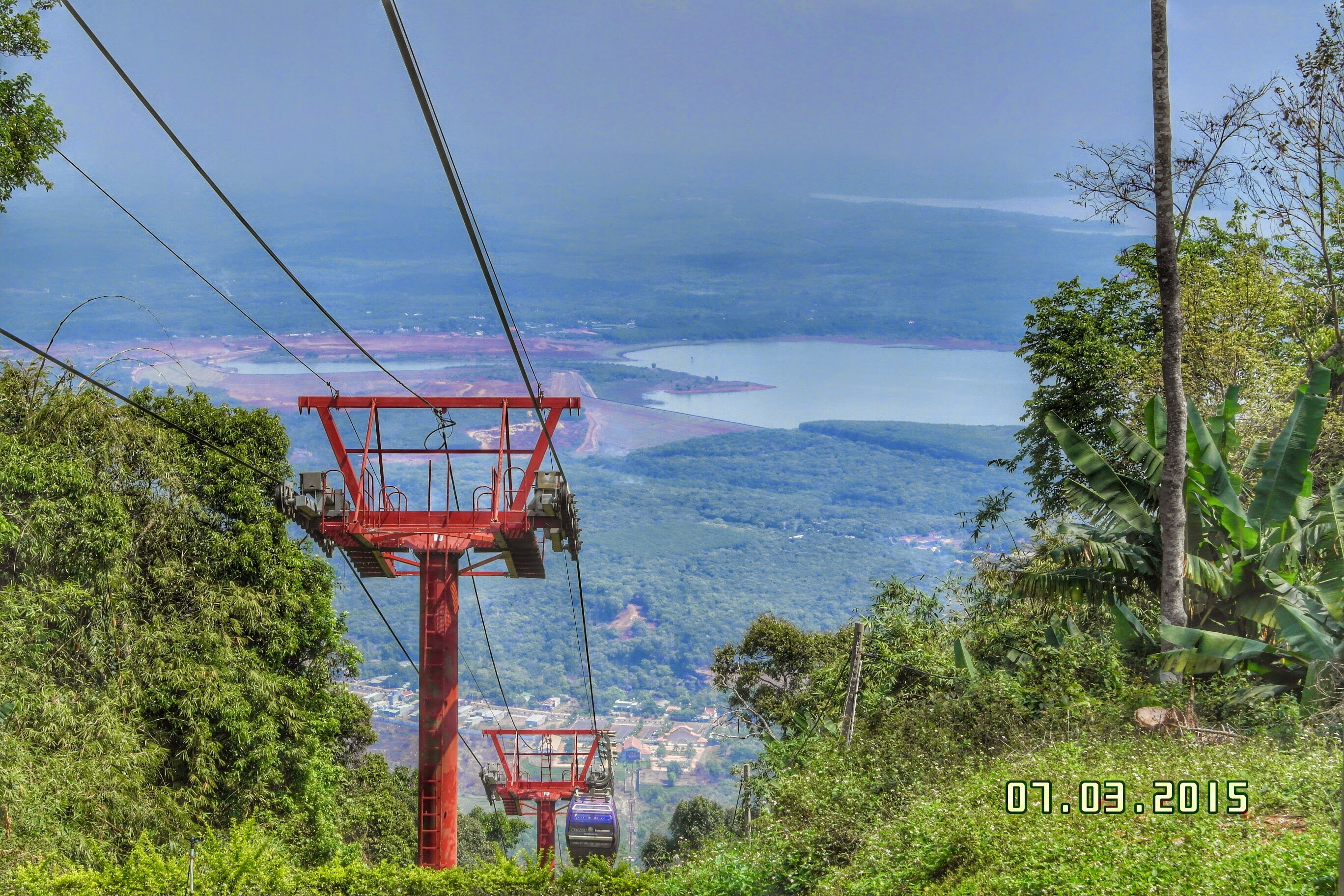
- Cable cars at Bà Rá mountain
- Interactive map of Phước Long
- Coordinates: 11°49′48″N 107°01′32″E
- Country: Vietnam
- Municipality: Đồng Nai
- Established: June 16, 2025

Area
  - Total: 27.75 sq mi (71.87 km^{2})

Population (2024)
  - Total: 33,145
  - Density: 1,194/sq mi (461.2/km^{2})
- Time zone: UTC+07:00 (Indochina Time)
- Administrative code: 25217

Phước Long (Vietnamese: Phường Phước Long) is a ward of Đồng Nai, Vietnam. It is one of the 95 new wards, communes and special zones of the province following the reorganization in 2025.

== History ==
On June 16, 2025, the National Assembly Standing Committee issued Resolution No. 1662/NQ-UBTVQH15 on the arrangement of commune-level administrative units of Đồng Nai province in 2025 (effective from June 16, 2025). Accordingly, the entire land area and population of Long Thủy, Thác Mơ, Sơn Giang wards and Phước Tín commune of the former Phước Long town will be integrated into a new ward named Phước Long (Clause 86, Article 1).
