= Đồng Phú, Đồng Nai =

Đồng Phú Phường Đồng Phú
- Ward
- Đồng Phú ward
- Location within Vietnam
- Coordinates: 11°26′57″N 106°52′17″E
- Country: Vietnam
- Region: Southeast
- Municipality: Đồng Nai
- Time zone: UTC+7 (UTC + 7)

Đồng Phú is a ward (phường) of Đồng Nai, Vietnam. It is one of the 95 new wards and communes of the city following the reorganization in 2025.

== History ==
On June 16, 2025, the Standing Committee of the National Assembly issued Resolution No. 1662/NQ-UBTVQH15 on the arrangement of commune-level administrative units in Đồng Nai province in 2025. Accordingly, the entire natural area and population of Tân Phú Township and the communes of Tân Tiến and Tân Lập, formerly in Đồng Phú district, were merged to form a new commune named Đồng Phú Commune.
