= Trảng Dài =

- Ward (Viet Nam)
- Location in Vietnam
- Coordinates: 10°59′13″N 106°52′03″E
- Country: Vietnam
- Municipality: Đồng Nai

Area
  - Total: 5.6 sq mi (14.4 km^{2})

Population (2018)
  - Total: 55,189
- Time zone: UTC+7 (UTC+7)

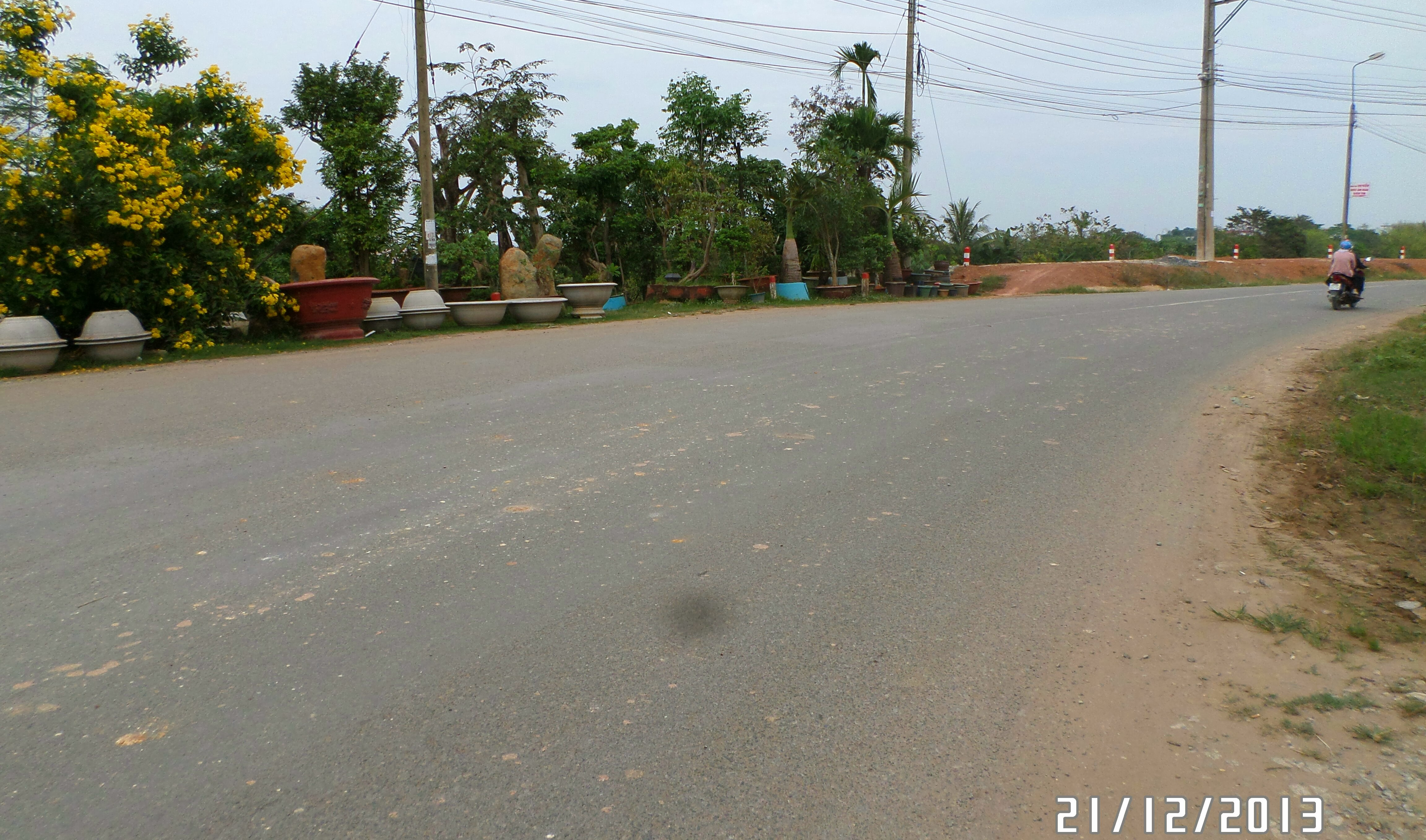

Trảng Dài is a ward located in Đồng Nai, Vietnam. It has an area of about 14.4km2 and the population in 2018 was 55,189.
