= Phú Riềng district =

Phú Riềng district Huyện Phú Riềng
- District
- Location within Vietnam
- Coordinates: 11°41′31″N 106°54′07″E
- Country: Vietnam
- Region: Southeast
- Province: Bình Phước
- Capital: Bù Nho
- Time zone: UTC+7 (UTC + 7)

Phú Riềng is a former rural district of Bình Phước province in the Southeast region of Vietnam.

Phú Riềng district was formed from the southern portion of Bù Gia Mập district on May 11, 2015.

The district is subdivided to 8 rural communes: Bình Sơn, Bình Tân, Bù Nho, Long Bình, Long Hà, Long Hưng, Long Tân, Phú Riềng, Phú Trung, Phước Tân. The district capital lies at Bù Nho commune.
