= Thác Mơ Hydroelectric Power Plant =

- Interactive map of Thác Mơ Hydroelectric Power Plant
- Country: Vietnam
- Status: Operational
- Opening date: 1994

The Thác Mơ Hydroelectric Power Plant is a power plant on the Bé River in Đức Hạnh commune of Bù Gia Mập District, Bình Phước Province, Vietnam.
