= Trảng Bom district =

Coordinates: 10°57′13″N 107°00′21″E

Trảng Bom district Huyện Trảng Bom
- District
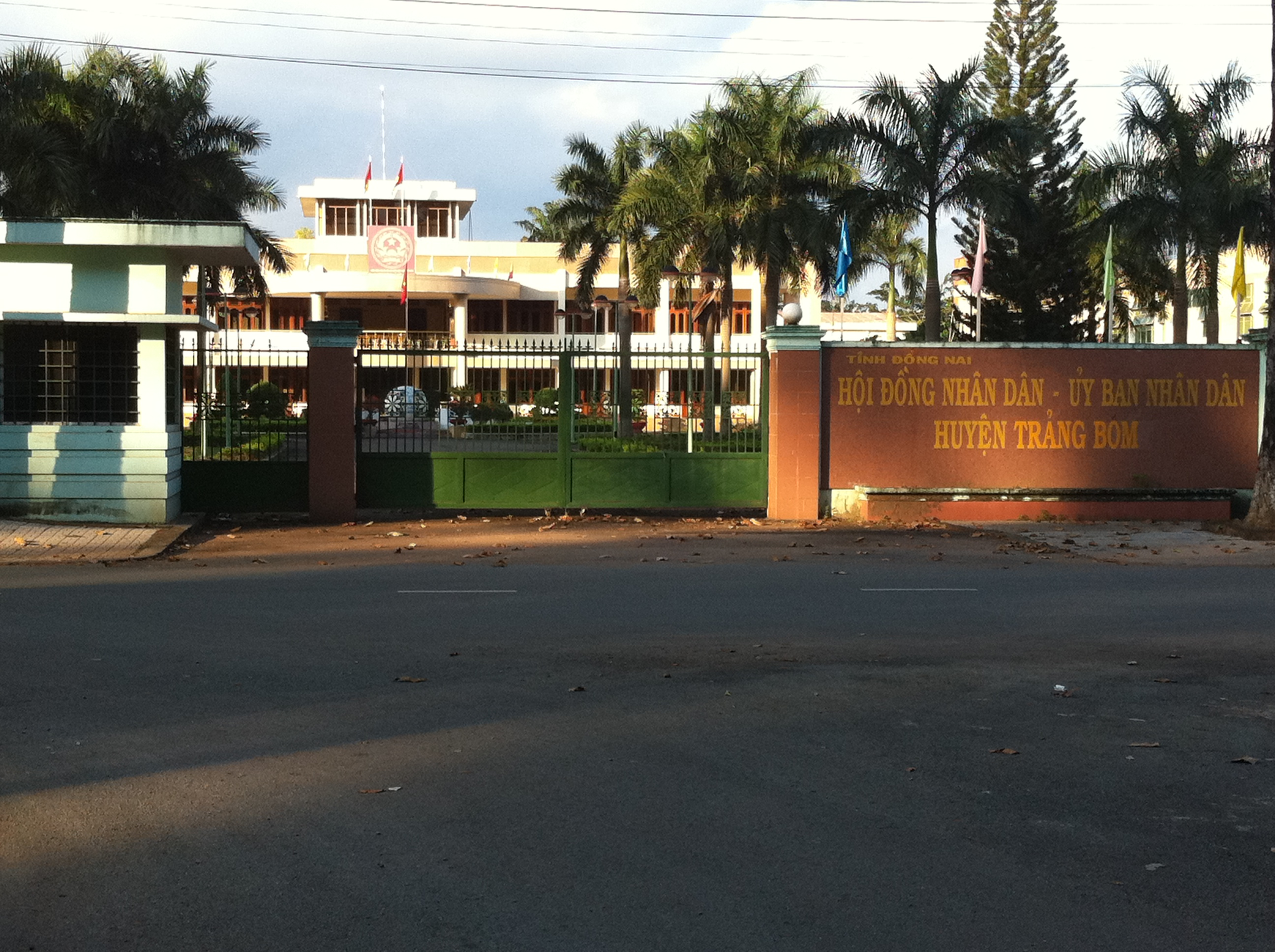
- People's Committee of Trảng Bom District

- Seal
- Interactive map of Trảng Bom district
- Country: Vietnam
- Region: Southeast
- Province: Đồng Nai
- Capital: Trảng Bom

Area
  - District: 126 sq mi (326 km^{2})

Population (2024 census)
  - District: 371,432
  - Density: 2,950/sq mi (1,140/km^{2})
  - Urban: 57,560
- Time zone: UTC+7 (Indochina Time)

Trảng Bom is a former rural district of Đồng Nai province in the Southeast region of Vietnam. Located on National Highway 1.

The village of Trảng Bom was attacked by Viet Cong forces during the 1968 Tet Offensive and in February the Fire support base which contained New Zealand and American artillery and Australian cavalry, engineer, and infantry elements was attacked three times by Viet Cong forces during Operation Coburg but were successfully repelled each time. Trảng Bom was also the site of fierce fighting in April 1975, prior to the fall of Saigon and the end of the Republic of Vietnam.

As of 2024 the district had a population of 371,432. The district covers an area of 326 km^{2} (126 sq mi). The district capital lies at Trảng Bom.

== Administrative divisions ==
In the district there are 16 municipalities:

- An Viễn
- Bàu Hàm 1
- Bắc Sơn
- Bình Minh, Trảng Bom
- Cây Gáo
- Đông Hòa
- Đồi 61
- Giang Điền
- Hố Nai 3
- Hưng Thịnh
- Quảng Tiến
- Sông Thao
- Sông Trầu
- Tây Hòa
- Thanh Bình
- Trung Hòa
