= Long Phước =

Long Phước is a common place name in Vietnam. It is the same two chu Han characters reversed as another common place name Phước Long

In English texts it usually refers to xã Long Phước, Bà Rịa-Vũng Tàu, a village destroyed by the Australian Army in 1966.

Other meanings are:

- phường vi:Long Phước, Quận 9, in District 9, Ho Chi Minh City
- phường vi:Long Phước, Phước Long, in vi:Phước Long (thị xã), of Bình Phước province
- xã vi:Long Phước, Bến Cầu, in Bến Cầu District, Tây Ninh Province
- xã vi:Long Phước, Long Thành, in Long Thành District, Đồng Nai Province
- xã vi:Long Phước, Long Hồ, in Long Hồ District, Vĩnh Long Province
