= Bù Gia Mập district =

Coordinates: 10°56′57″N 106°59′21″E

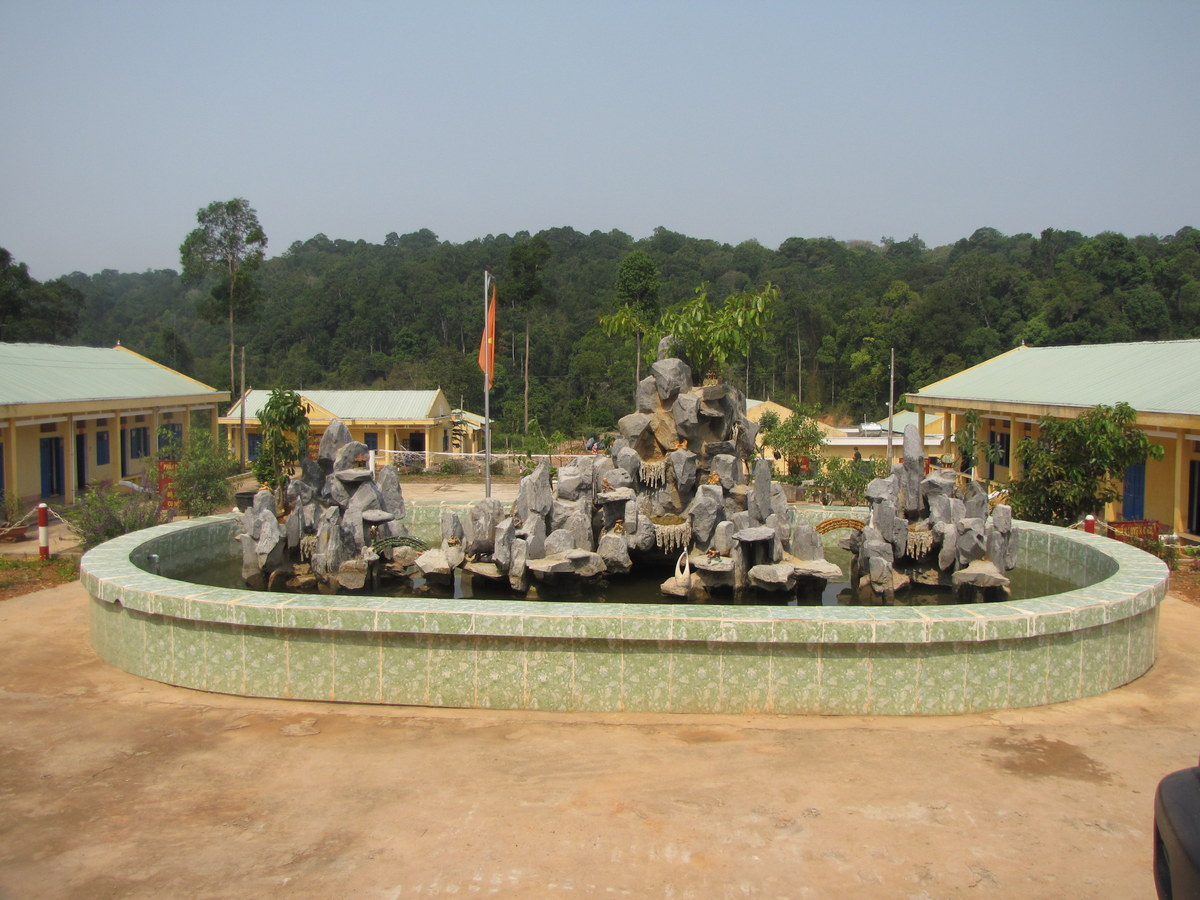
- Monument in Bù Gia

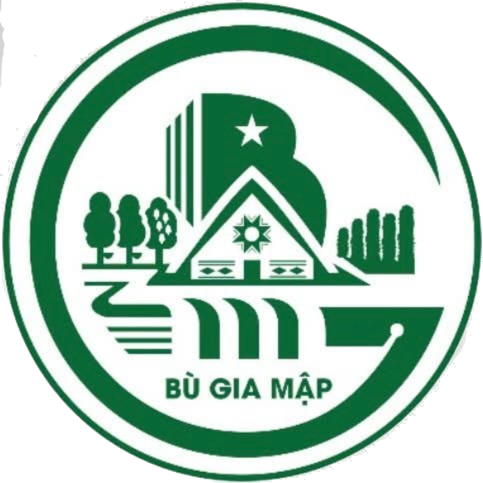
- Seal
- Interactive map of Bù Gia Mập district
- Country: Vietnam
- Region: Southeast
- Province: Bình Phước

Bù Gia Mập is a former rural district (huyện) of Bình Phước province in the Southeast region of Vietnam. It was established on 11 August 2009 on the land of Phước Long district remaining after the establishment of Phước Long town. At that time, it had a population of 147,967.

== Divisions ==
Bù Gia Mập district is subdivided to 10 rural communes: Bình Thắng, Bù Gia Mập, Đa Kia, Đak Ơ, Đức Hạnh, Phú Nghĩa, Phú Văn, Phước Minh. The district capital lies at Phú Nghĩa commune.

The Thác Mơ Hydroelectric Power Plant is located in Đức Hạnh commune.

Due resistance to malaria drugs has grown in the last decade, officials in Bù Gia Mập District now see little hope of eliminating malaria in that district.
