= Phú Riềng =

Phú Riềng Xã Phú Riềng
- Rural commune
- Phú Riềng commune
- Location within Vietnam
- Coordinates: 11°44′03″N 106°52′25″E
- Country: Vietnam
- Region: Southeast
- Municipality: Đồng Nai
- Time zone: UTC+7 (UTC + 7)

Phú Riềng is a rural commune (xã) of Đồng Nai, Vietnam.
