= Xuân Lộc district =

District in South East Vietnam

Xuân Lộc district Huyện Xuân Lộc
- District
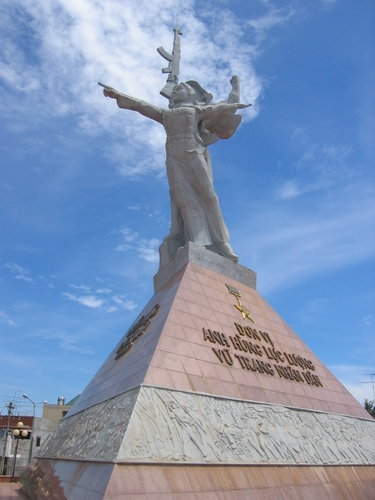
- Monument commemorating the PAVN victory in the Battle of Xuân Lộc

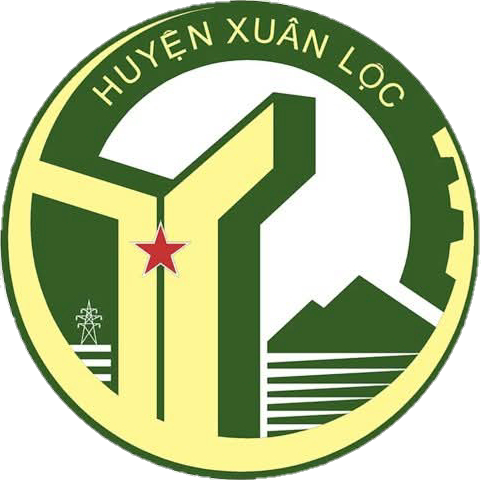
- Seal

- Location within Vietnam
- Coordinates: 10.833°N 107.417°E
- Country: Vietnam
- Region: South East
- Province: Đồng Nai
- Capital: Gia Ray

Population (2019)
  - Total: 253,140
- Time zone: UTC+07:00 (Indochina Time)

Xuân Lộc ([s⁽ʷ⁾əŋ˧˧ ləwk͡p̚˨˩˨], swung-louk) is a former rural district of Đồng Nai province, Vietnam, in the Southeast region of the country. Located on National Highway 1 leading out of Ho Chi Minh City, it is most notable for the battle of Xuân Lộc, which took place in April 1975. This was the final large battle of the Vietnam War, where the Army of the Republic of Vietnam poured all of its reserve units in order to halt the advance of the Vietnam People's Army.

As of 2003 the district had a population of 207,773. The district covers an area of 727 km^{2} (281 sq mi). The district capital lies at Gia Ray.

== Administrative divisions ==
Xuân Lộc consists of 1 township, Gia Ray, and 14 communes: Bảo Hòa, Lang Minh, Suối Cao, Suối Cát, Xuân Bắc, Xuân Định, Xuân Hiệp, Xuân Hòa, Xuân Hưng, Xuân Phú, Xuân Tâm, Xuân Thành, Xuân Thọ and Xuân Trường.
