= Ngo Quyen High School =

Ngô Quyền High School

Location
- 328, 30/4 Street, Trung Dung Ward, Bien Hoa; Đồng Nai; Vietnam
- 10.9547°N 106.8259°E

Information
- Type: Public
- Established: 1956
- Principal: Nguyễn Duy Phúc
- Faculty: 70
- Grades: 10-12
- Enrollment: Approx. 1,500
- Website: http://thptngoquyen.edu.vn/

Ngô Quyền High School (Vietnamese: Trường Trung Học Phổ Thông Chuyên Ban Ngô Quyền or Trường Trung Học Phổ Thông Ngô Quyền) was one of the first schools in Đồng Nai Province. It was founded in 1956.

== History ==
In 2003, the school had six of its teachers certified as excellent teachers at the provincial level while being awarded 109 provincial-level prizes for its gifted students and seeing 20 percent of its students gaining honored certificates. In the same school year, all of its 12th-grade students passed their graduation exams, with 46 percent of these students passing college or university entrance exams.

The school's headmaster, Nguyen Duy Phuc, said that to satisfy students' demand, in early March each year, the school coordinates with the Department of Education and Training in Đồng Nai Province to open meetings providing advice related to universities' enrollment for 12th-grade students. The school also posted military colleges and universities' enrollment reports to encourage its students to apply for participating in exams to be enrolled at these colleges and universities.

With its achievements, the school was awarded a third-grade Labor Order by the President in 1994, and a second-grade Labor Order by the President in 1998. Most recently, the school gained a first-prize for the whole group at the first military sport festival of Đồng Nai education sector.

== Principals ==
School year	Principal	Vice Principal
1956–1959	Phan Văn Nga	
1959–1961	Huỳnh Quốc Tuấn	
1961–1973	Phạm Đức Bảo	
1973–1975	Phạm Khắc Thành	
1975–1976	Nguyễn Xuân Kỳ	Mai Kiến Phúc Nguyễn Thị Luông
1976–1982	Bùi Văn Tý	Nguyễn Văn Nhì Bùi Quang Tú
1982–1985	Bùi Văn Tý	Tô Hoàn Lộc
1985–1987	Tô Hoàn Lộc	Đỗ Hữu Tài Hồ Xuân Nghiêm, Đặng Thị Hòa
1987–1989	Tô Hoàn Lộc	Đỗ Hữu Tài Hồ Xuân Nghiêm, Diệp Cẩm Thu
1989–1993	Đỗ Hữu Tài	Diệp Cẩm Thu Hồ Xuân Nghiêm
1993–2002	Hồ Xuân Nghiêm	Nguyễn Thị Hoa Trần Minh Tâm
2002–2003	Nguyễn Duy Phúc	Trần Nghĩa Dũng Trần Minh Tâm
2003–2021	Nguyễn Duy Phúc	Trần Nghĩa Dũng Nguyễn Thị Thao
2021–present	Phan Trọng Nghĩa	
