= Long Khánh (city) =

Coordinates: 10.917°N 107.167°E

- Provincial city (Class-3)
- Long Khánh City; Thành phố Long Khánh
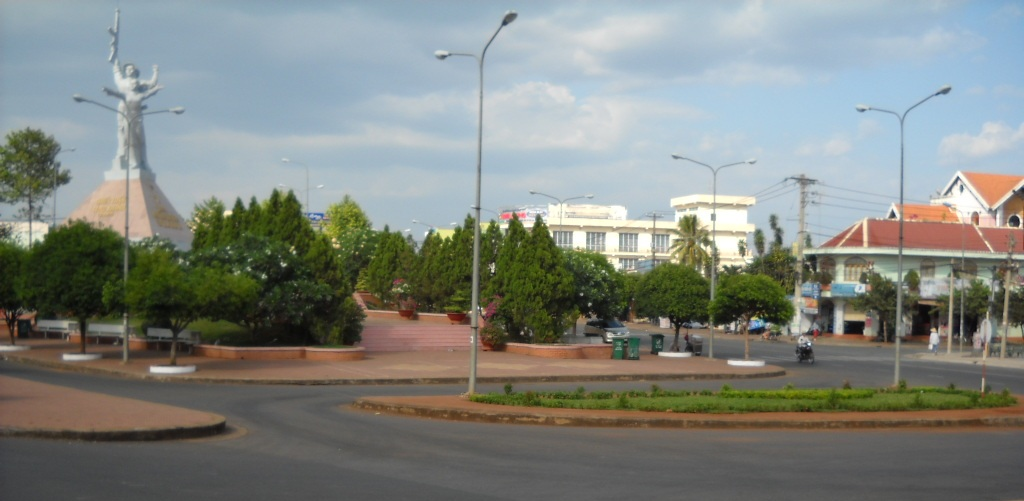
- Interactive map of Long Khánh
- Location within Vietnam Location within Southeast Asia Location within Asia
- Country: Vietnam
- Region: Southeast
- Province: Đồng Nai

Area
  - Provincial city (Class-3): 75 sq mi (195 km^{2})

Population (2019 census)
  - Provincial city (Class-3): 151,467
  - Density: 2,010/sq mi (777/km^{2})
  - Urban: 54,753
- Time zone: UTC+7 (Indochina Time)

Long Khánh is a former provincial city of Đồng Nai province in the Southeast region of Vietnam. It covers an area of 194 km^{2} (75 sq mi) and had a population of 151,467 in 2019.

Long Khánh city's predecessor was Long Khánh town, which founded in 2003. It was recognized as a city in 2019.

== Geography ==
Long Khánh is located entirely in Đồng Nai territory. It shares borders with:

- Xuân Lộc district to the east
- Thống Nhất district to the west
- Cẩm Mỹ district to the south
- Xuân Lộc district, Thống Nhất district and Định Quán district to the North

Long Khánh has 15 divisions (11 wards and 4 commune), include:

- Ward: Xuân An, Xuân Bình, Xuân Hòa, Xuân Trung, Xuân Thanh, Phú Bình, Bảo Vinh, Suối Tre, Xuân Lập, Bàu Sen, Xuân Tân
- Commune: Bảo Quang, Hàng Gòn, Bình Lộc, Bàu Trâm.

== Sights ==
- Saint Joseph Great Seminary of Xuân Lộc is the seventh major seminary of the Catholic Church in Vietnam
- Cathedral of Christ the King (Cathedral of Long Khánh)
- Monument of Victory
- Hang Gon dolmen tomb (Hàng Gòn, Long Khánh)
- Chua Chan mountain (Xuân Lộc, Long Khánh)
