= Phú Nghĩa, Đồng Nai =

Phú Nghĩa Xã Phú Nghĩa
- Rural commune
- Phú Nghĩa commune
- Location within Vietnam
- Coordinates: 11°54′47″N 107°00′15″E
- Country: Vietnam
- Region: Southeast
- Municipality: Đồng Nai
- Time zone: UTC+7 (UTC + 7)

Phú Nghĩa is a rural commune (xã) of Đồng Nai, Vietnam.
