= Cẩm Mỹ, Đồng Nai =

Cẩm Mỹ Xã Cẩm Mỹ
- Rural commune
- Cẩm Mỹ commune
- Location within Vietnam
- Coordinates: 10°48′40″N 107°13′39″E
- Country: Vietnam
- Region: Southeast
- Municipality: Đồng Nai
- Time zone: UTC+7 (UTC + 7)

Cẩm Mỹ is a rural commune (xã) of Đồng Nai, Vietnam.
