= Biên Hòa province =

Historic province of South Vietnam

Biên Hòa Tỉnh Biên Hòa Trấn Biên
- Province
- Biên Hòa Province
- Interactive map of Biên Hòa
- Country: South Vietnam
- Region: Southeast Vietnam
- Established: 1832
- Dissolved: May 1975
- Seat: Sông Phố Square, Bình Trước

Biên Hòa (chữ Hán: 邊和) was a former province of Vietnam under the Nguyễn dynasty and the South Vietnam. By June 2025, the original Biên Hòa corresponded areas of Đồng Nai province, Bà Rịa–Vũng Tàu province and Bình Phước province with total area of over 17.000 km^{2}.

== History ==
=== Under Nguyễn lords ===
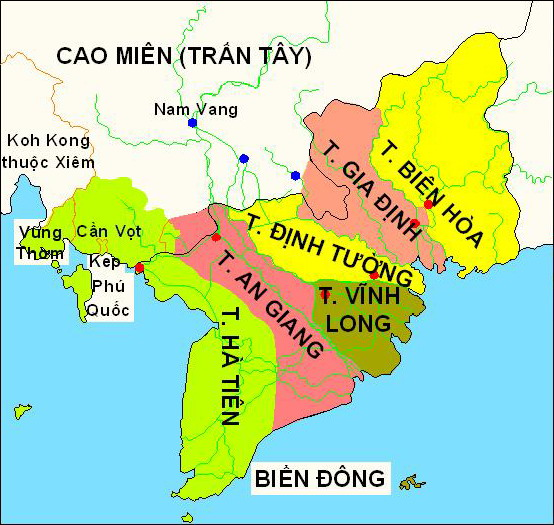
Nam Kỳ Lục tỉnh (1832 - 1841)

In 1698, Lord Minh ordered Lễ Thành hầu establishing Gia Định prefecture with two districts in Cao Miên territory: Phúc Long district based on Đồng Nai, protected by Trấn Biên palace; and Tân Bình district based on Sài Gòn, protected by Phiên Trấn palace.

In 1715, Phiên Trấn commander – Trần Thượng Xuyên, and Trấn Biên deputy commander – Nguyễn Cửu Phú led Gia Định forces to support Nặc Yêm (Ang Em) in defeating Nặc Thâm (Ang Tham) and retaking the La Bích (Lavek) citadel. Lord Minh appointed Nặc Yêm as the new king of Cao Miên.

=== Under Nguyễn dynasty ===
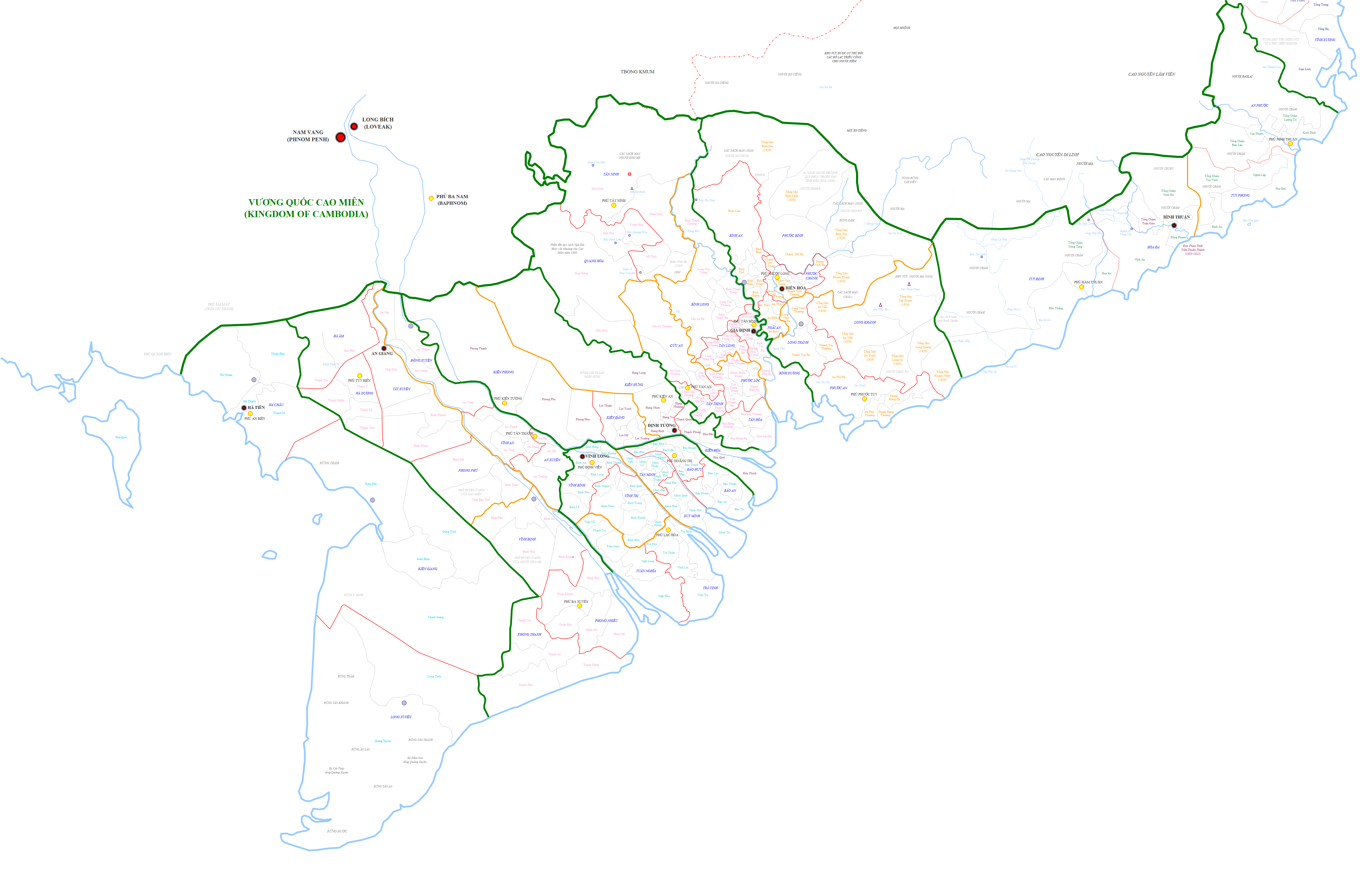
Six Provinces of Lower Cochinchina, and Bình Thuận in 1850

Biên Hòa province was first established in 1832 when Emperor Minh Mạng divided Lower Cochinchina into Six Provinces. Biên Hòa province contained one prefecture: Phước Long, divided into four districts: Phước Chính, Phước An, Bình An, and Long Thành.

By the 4th year under Tự Đức (1851), Biên Hòa contained two prefectures: Phước Long, and Phước Tuy, dividing to seven districts: Phước Chính, Bình An, Phước Bình, Nghĩa An, Phước An, Long Thành, and Long Khánh.

In 1876 it was split to Biên Hòa, Thủ Dầu Một and Bà Rịa.

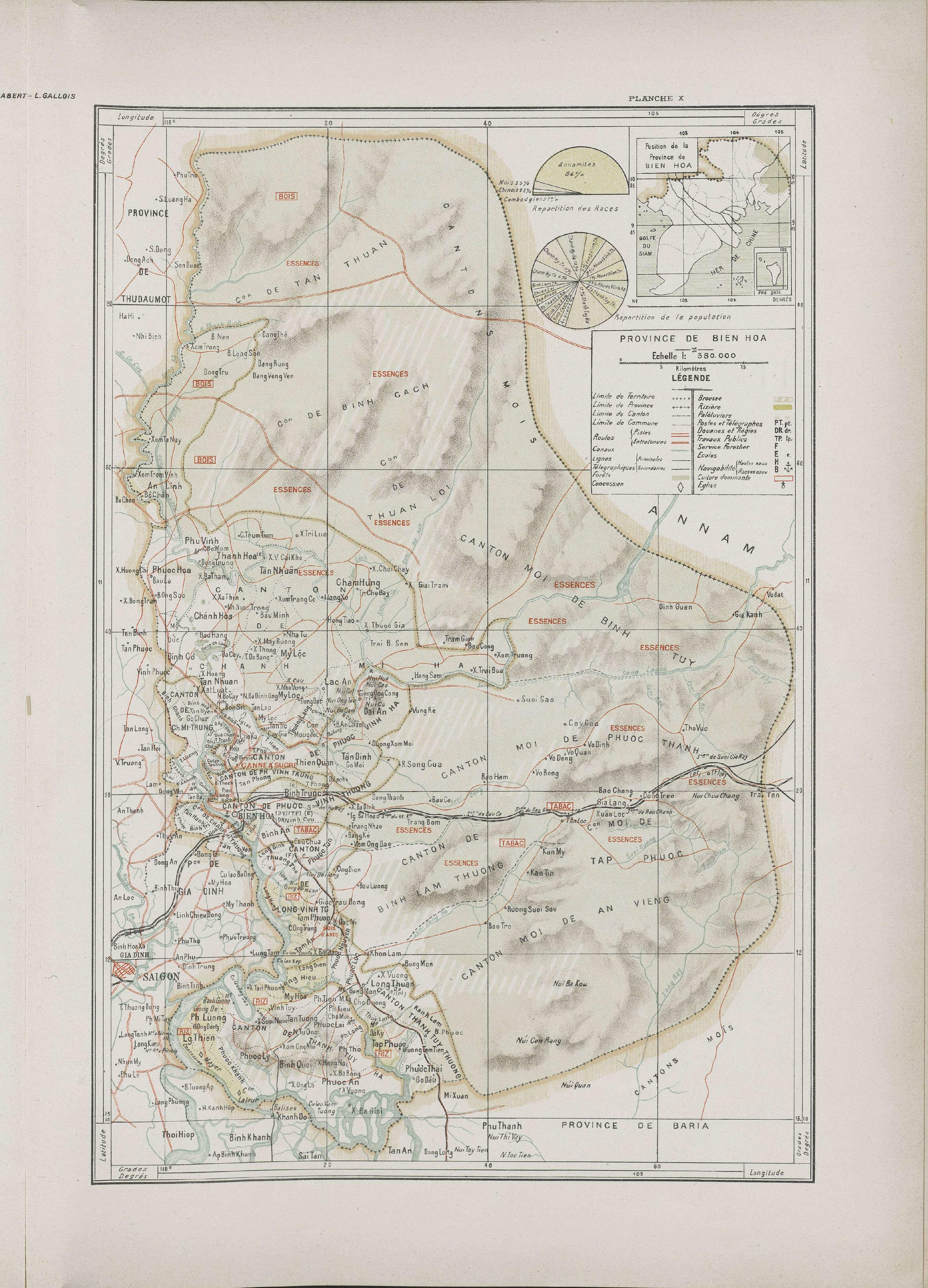
Map of Bien Hoa province in 1909

=== After August Revolution ===
On October 22, 1956, it was split to 4 provinces are: Biên Hòa, Long Khánh, Phước Long, Bình Long. On May 2, 1957, it contained four districts, Châu Thành Biên Hòa (then renamed as Đức Tu, which is equivalent to the later Vĩnh Cửu district and Biên Hòa City), Long Thành, Dĩ An and Tân Uyên. On January 23, 1959, Tân Uyên was separated and the rest became Phước Thành province.

During Republic of Vietnam period, Biên Hòa hosted several ARVN critical bases like the III Corps Headquarters, the Long Bình Post, and the Biên Hòa Air Base.

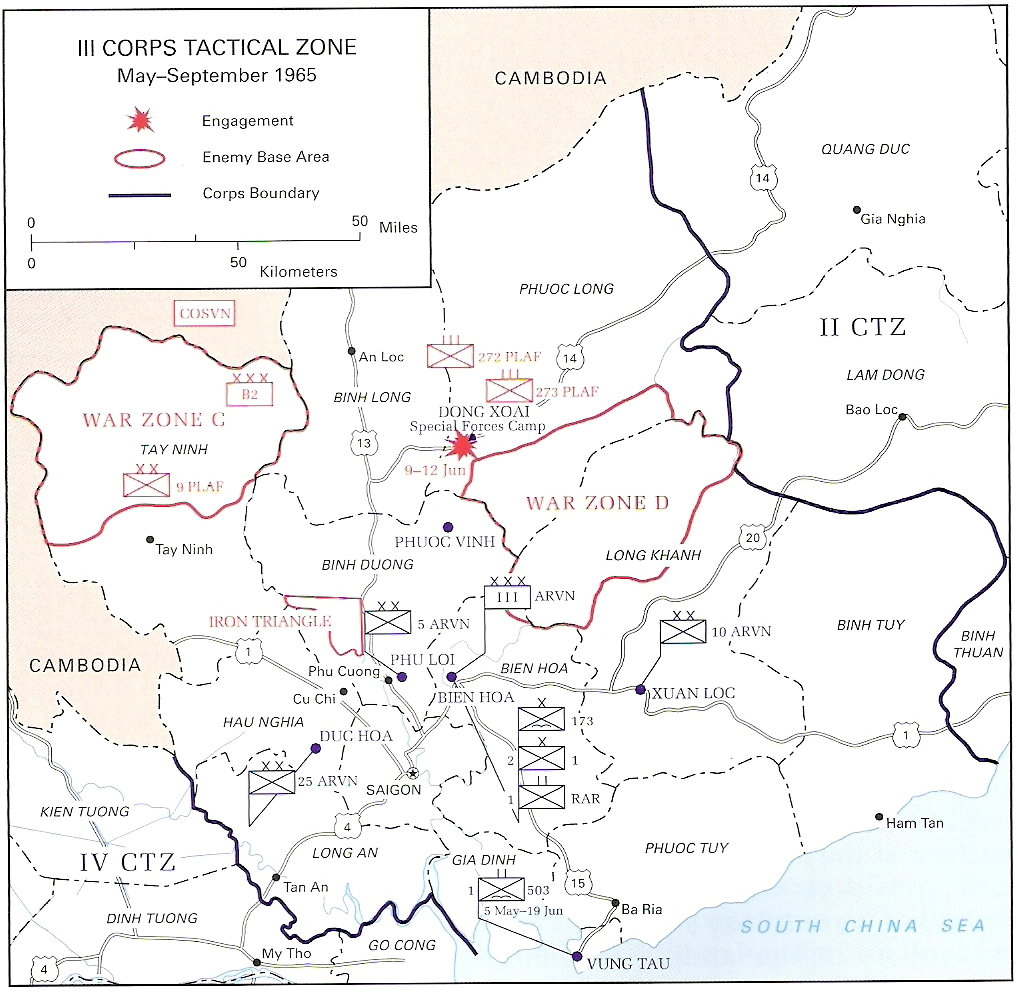
III CTZ May to September 1965

The northernmost of Biên Hòa was also the southernmost of the Viet Cong War Zone D.
