= Phước Tân, Đồng Nai =

Phước Tân
- Ward
- Location in Vietnam
- Coordinates: 10°53′31″N 106°54′19″E
- Country: Vietnam
- Municipality: Đồng Nai

Area
  - Total: 16.5 sq mi (42.7 km^{2})

Population (2018)
  - Total: 52,602
- Time zone: UTC+7 (UTC+7)

Phước Tân is a ward located in Đồng Nai, Vietnam. It has an area of about 42.7km2 and the population in 2018 was 52,602.
