= Bình Hòa =

Bình Hòa may refer to the following places in Vietnam:

- Bình Hòa, Ho Chi Minh City
- Bình Hòa, An Giang
- Bình Hòa, Quảng Ngãi, location of the 1966 Bình Hòa massacre
