= An Lộc, Đồng Nai =

An Lộc Phường An Lộc
- Ward
- Interactive map of An Lộc
- Coordinates: 11°39′37″N 106°37′28″E
- Country: Vietnam
- Municipality: Đồng Nai
- Established: June 16, 2025

Area
  - Total: 34.26 sq mi (88.74 km^{2})

Population (2024)
  - Total: 35,531
  - Density: 1,037/sq mi (400.4/km^{2})
- Time zone: UTC+07:00 (Indochina Time)
- Administrative code: 25333

An Lộc (Vietnamese: Phường An Lộc) is a ward of Đồng Nai, Vietnam. It is one of the 95 new wards, communes and special zones of the province following the reorganization in 2025.

== History ==
On June 16, 2025, the National Assembly Standing Committee issued Resolution No. 1662/NQ-UBTVQH15 on the arrangement of commune-level administrative units of Đồng Nai province in 2025 (effective from June 16, 2025). Accordingly, the entire land area and population of Phú Thịnh ward and Thanh Phú, Thanh Lương communes of the former Bình Long town will be integrated into a new ward named An Lộc (Clause 84, Article 1).
