= Xuân Lộc, Đồng Nai =

Xuân Lộc Phường Xuân Lộc
- Ward
- Xuân Lộc ward
- Location within Vietnam
- Coordinates: 10°55′35″N 107°24′10″E
- Country: Vietnam
- Region: Southeast
- Municipality: Đồng Nai
- Time zone: UTC+7 (UTC + 7)

Xuân Lộc is a ward (phường) of Đồng Nai, Vietnam.
