= Hưng Thịnh, Đồng Nai =

Hưng Thịnh
- Commune
- Hưng Thịnh commune
- Location of in Vietnam
- Coordinates: 10°55′11″N 107°01′55″E
- Country: Vietnam
- Municipality: Đồng Nai

Area
  - Total: 17.4 km^{2} (6.7 sq mi)

Population (2014)
  - Total: 9,136
  - Density: 530/km^{2} (1,400/sq mi)
- Climate: Aw

Hưng Thịnh is a commune in Đồng Nai, Vietnam. It is the intermediary point between Trảng Bom and Thống Nhất District.

In 2014, the estimated population was 9,136, and the population density was 530 people/km^{2}.
