= Phước Long (town) =

- District-level town (Class-4)
- Phước Long Town; Thị xã Phước Long
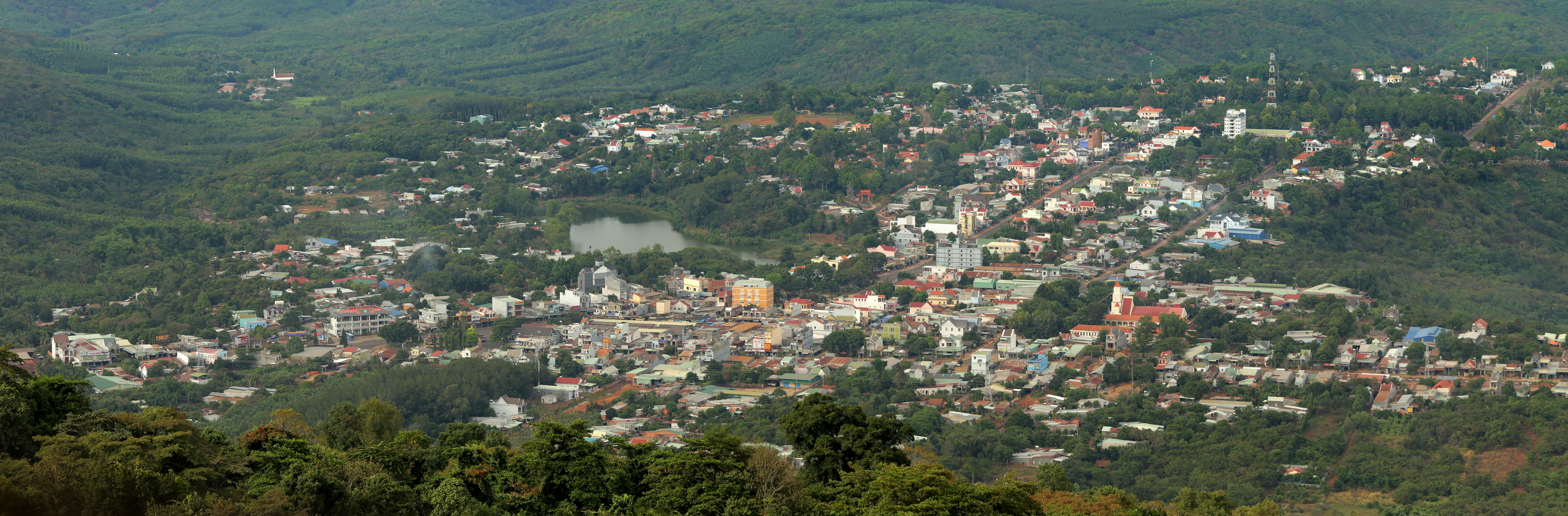
- Coordinates: 11°49′16″N 106°57′30″E
- Country: Vietnam
- Region: Southeast
- Province: Bình Phước

Area
  - Total: 46.09 sq mi (119.38 km^{2})

Population (2022)
  - Total: 81,200
  - Density: 1,760/sq mi (680/km^{2})
- Time zone: UTC+07:00 (Indochina Time)

Phước Long is a former district-level town in Bình Phước Province, in the Southeast region of Vietnam. It was the site of the Battle of Phước Long, a decisive battle during the Vietnam War.

The current administrative unit was established in 2009 from part of former Phước Long District, including Thác Mơ township and Phước Bình township. It covers 119.38 km^{2} and has a population of 81.200 as of 2022. Bù Gia Mập District was established from the other part of Phước Long District.

The town has seven subdivisions, including Long Thủy, Thác Mơ, Sơn Giang, Phước Bình, Long Phước, and the communes of Long Giang and Phước Tín.

It borders Bù Đăng District to the east, Bù Gia Mập District to the north and Phú Riềng District to the west and south.

== Climate ==
Climate data for Phước Long
| Month | Jan | Feb | Mar | Apr | May | Jun | Jul | Aug | Sep | Oct | Nov | Dec | Year |
|---|---|---|---|---|---|---|---|---|---|---|---|---|---|
| Record high °C (°F) | 35.4 (95.7) | 37.2 (99.0) | 38.8 (101.8) | 39.7 (103.5) | 38.4 (101.1) | 35.9 (96.6) | 34.6 (94.3) | 35.0 (95.0) | 34.5 (94.1) | 35.1 (95.2) | 34.7 (94.5) | 35.0 (95.0) | 39.7 (103.5) |
| Mean daily maximum °C (°F) | 31.8 (89.2) | 33.2 (91.8) | 34.4 (93.9) | 34.5 (94.1) | 33.3 (91.9) | 31.5 (88.7) | 30.9 (87.6) | 30.6 (87.1) | 30.7 (87.3) | 31.0 (87.8) | 31.3 (88.3) | 30.9 (87.6) | 32.0 (89.6) |
| Daily mean °C (°F) | 24.6 (76.3) | 25.6 (78.1) | 27.0 (80.6) | 27.7 (81.9) | 27.3 (81.1) | 26.3 (79.3) | 25.8 (78.4) | 25.6 (78.1) | 25.5 (77.9) | 25.5 (77.9) | 25.2 (77.4) | 24.3 (75.7) | 25.9 (78.6) |
| Mean daily minimum °C (°F) | 19.6 (67.3) | 20.1 (68.2) | 21.7 (71.1) | 23.2 (73.8) | 23.7 (74.7) | 23.3 (73.9) | 23.0 (73.4) | 23.0 (73.4) | 22.8 (73.0) | 22.3 (72.1) | 21.2 (70.2) | 19.8 (67.6) | 22.0 (71.6) |
| Record low °C (°F) | 13.0 (55.4) | 14.6 (58.3) | 15.0 (59.0) | 19.5 (67.1) | 19.8 (67.6) | 20.8 (69.4) | 20.4 (68.7) | 19.9 (67.8) | 19.9 (67.8) | 16.5 (61.7) | 13.2 (55.8) | 13.0 (55.4) | 13.0 (55.4) |
| Average precipitation mm (inches) | 14.8 (0.58) | 18.4 (0.72) | 50.9 (2.00) | 128.4 (5.06) | 293.1 (11.54) | 366.9 (14.44) | 395.2 (15.56) | 453.6 (17.86) | 475.6 (18.72) | 320.5 (12.62) | 129.3 (5.09) | 33.8 (1.33) | 2,680.7 (105.54) |
| Average rainy days | 2.0 | 2.1 | 5.2 | 11.5 | 19.2 | 22.4 | 24.3 | 25.5 | 25.2 | 21.0 | 11.1 | 4.0 | 173.4 |
| Average relative humidity (%) | 70.9 | 70.2 | 70.8 | 74.7 | 80.6 | 85.1 | 86.7 | 88.1 | 88.4 | 86.3 | 80.2 | 74.3 | 79.8 |
| Mean monthly sunshine hours | 269.5 | 255.3 | 265.8 | 242.3 | 226.5 | 181.5 | 177.8 | 164.1 | 149.8 | 186.1 | 216.4 | 236.6 | 2,581.3 |
Source: Vietnam Institute for Building Science and Technology
