= Đồng Nai =

Centrally-governed city of Vietnam

- Centrally-governed city
- Thành phố Đồng Nai 城庯同狔
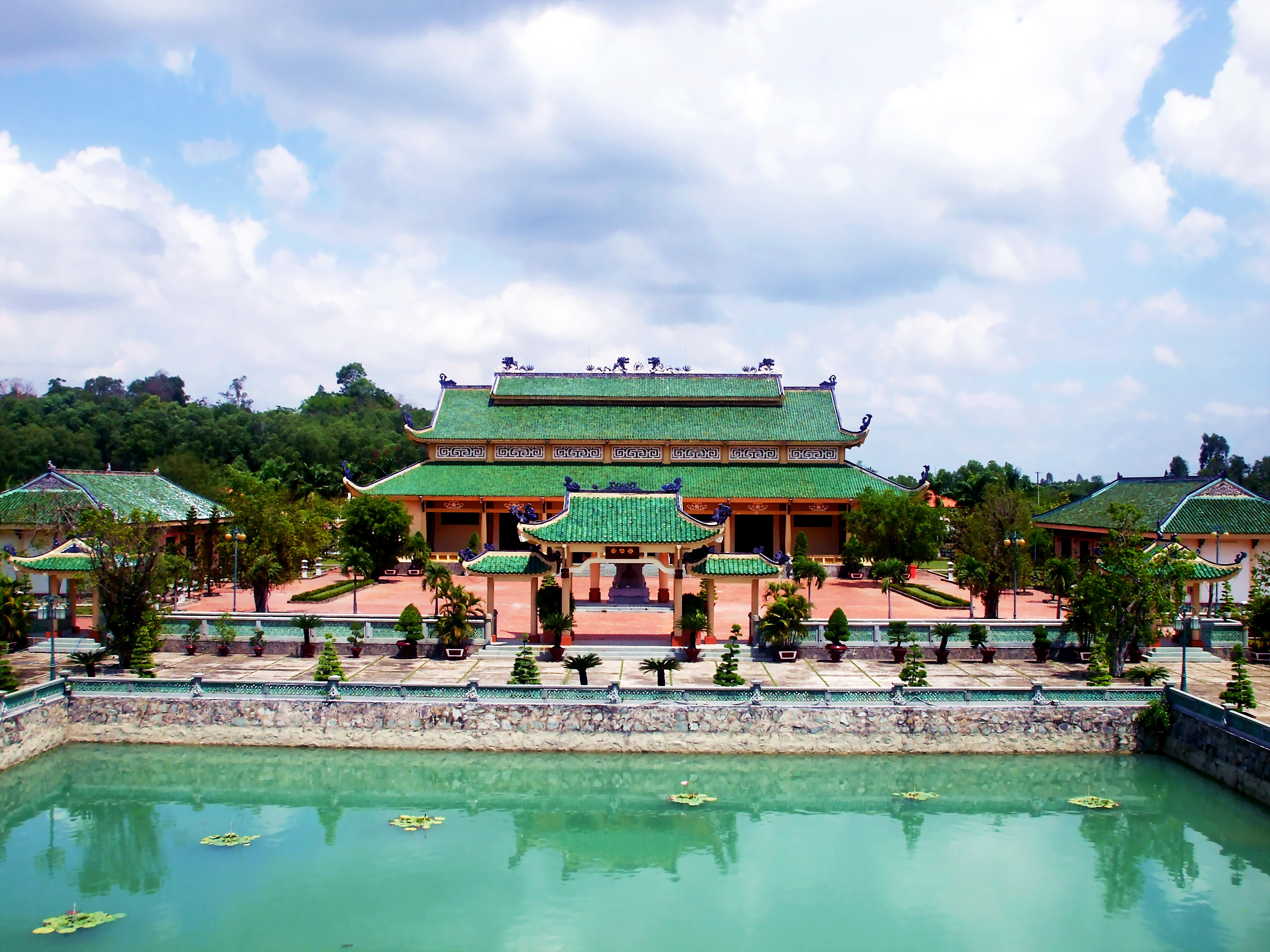
- Trấn Biên Temple of Literature in Trấn Biên Ward

- Seal
- Nickname: Field of Deers
- Location in Vietnam
- Interactive map of Đồng Nai
- Location within Vietnam Location within Asia
- Coordinates: 11°7′N 107°11′E
- Country: Vietnam
- Region: Southeast
- Metropolitan area: Ho Chi Minh City metropolitan area
- Established: 1698
- Capital: Trấn Biên Ward

Government
  - Party Secretary: Vũ Hồng Văn
  - Chair of the People's Committee: Nguyễn Văn Út
  - Chair of the People's Council: Tôn Ngọc Hạnh

Area
  - Total: 12,737.18 km^{2} (4,917.85 sq mi)
  - Rank: 9

Population (2026)
  - Total: 4,836,798
  - Rank: 5
  - Density: 379.7385/km^{2} (983.5183/sq mi)

Demographics
  - Ethnicities: Vietnamese, Hoa, Khmer, Xtiêng, Chơ Ro, Chăm

GDP (2025)
  - Total: VND 703.174 trillion US$ 27.967 billion
  - GDP per capita: VND 152,88 million US$ 6.080,4
- Time zone: UTC+7 (ICT)
- Area codes: 251 (from 17 June 2017); 61 (until 16 July 2017)
- ISO 3166 code: VN-39
- HDI (2025): ▲0.814 (3rd)
- Website: www.dongnai.gov.vn

Đồng Nai is a centrally-governed city in the Southeast region of Vietnam, located northeast of Ho Chi Minh City. In June 2025, it was merged with Bình Phước province, forming the new Đồng Nai Province with an area of 12.737,18 km^{2} and a population of 4,836,798 people. On 24 April 2026, the National Assembly passed a resolution establishing Đồng Nai city since 30 April 2026.

Đồng Nai is in southeastern Vietnam and bordered by Ho Chi Minh City, Tây Ninh, Lâm Đồng, and Cambodia. Đồng Nai has an advanced traffic system with many backbone national roads crossing it, such as: National Route 1A, National Route 20, National Route 51 and the North–South railway lines; located adjacent to the Saigon Port and Tan Son Nhat International Airport, it offers many advantages to economic activities in the area. Its location is very important for the development of the Southern economic main hub and a junction of the South Eastern and Tây Nguyên Highland.

Đồng Nai is based essentially on the system of lakes, dams and rivers, of which Trị An Lake with an area of 323 km^{2} and over 60 rivers, rivulets and canals are very favorable for the development of a number of aquatic products: raft bred fish and shrimp. The seasonal tropical forests are protected in Cát Tiên National Park, located in the north of Đồng Nai and the adjacent Vĩnh Cửu Nature Reserve; the former has been recognized internationally as a significant biosphere reserve. From the mountainous area, Đồng Nai River, Vietnam's largest internal waterway, flows southeast through Biên Hòa City, Ho Chi Minh City, and villages along its way. This river plays a crucial role in providing fresh water for the entire region.

== History ==
The earliest settlements in Đồng Nai were founded between 700 thousand and 500 thousand BCE, during the Stone Age.

In 1621, Lord Sãi (Nguyễn Phúc Nguyên) sent envoys to King Chey Chetta II of Champa, requesting permission for Vietnamese people to settle and trade in Đồng Nai.

On December 23, 1978, Hố Nai 1 and Hố Nai 2 communes from Thống Nhất District were merged into Biên Hòa city. On December 29, 1978, Duyên Hải District was transferred to Ho Chi Minh City following the 4th session of the 6th National Assembly. On May 30, 1979, territory was reallocated from Vũng Tàu town and Long Sơn commune (Châu Thành District) to establish the Vũng Tàu–Côn Đảo special zone.

On December 23, 1985, Vĩnh Cửu District was upgraded to Vĩnh An town. On April 10, 1991, parts of Xuân Lộc District were reorganized to form Long Khánh District, and parts of Tân Phú District were used to establish Định Quán District.

On August 12, 1991, the National Assembly’s 9th session passed a resolution merging the districts of Châu Thành, Long Đất, and Xuyên Mộc into the Vũng Tàu–Côn Đảo special zone, forming Bà Rịa–Vũng Tàu Province.

In 1993, Biên Hòa City was designated a Class-II urban area under provincial jurisdiction. On June 23, 1994, part of Long Thành District was carved out to form Nhơn Trạch District. On August 29, 1994, Vĩnh An town was dissolved to reestablish Vĩnh Cửu District.

On August 21, 2003, per Government Decree No. 97/2003/NĐ-CP, Long Khánh District was split to create Long Khánh town and Cẩm Mỹ District, and part of Thống Nhất District was reorganized to form Trảng Bom District.

On December 30, 2015, the Prime Minister issued Decision No. 2488/QĐ-TTg, upgrading Biên Hòa City to a Class-I urban area under provincial jurisdiction. On June 1, 2019, Long Khánh town was elevated to Long Khánh City. At that point, Đồng Nai comprised two cities and nine districts.

On June 12, 2025, the National Assembly passed Resolution No. 202/2025/QH15, effective that same day, merging Bình Phước Province into Đồng Nai.

On 14 April 2026, the Standing Committee of the National Assembly issued Resolution No. 237/NQ-UBTVQH16, establishing ten wards in Đồng Nai Province by converting the communes of Dầu Giây, Đồng Phú, Long Thành, Lộc Ninh, Nhơn Trạch, Tân Khai, Tân Phú, Trảng Bom, Trị An, and Xuân Lộc, while retaining their existing area and population.

The draft resolution establishing Dong Nai city as a centrally-governed city is expected to be approved by the National Assembly at the end of April 2026, with a proposed effective date of April 30, 2026. This is a step towards realizing the plan to transform Dong Nai into a modern economic and urban center of the Southeast region.

== Demographics ==
Đồng Nai has a population of 4,836,798 in 2025 Its population has been growing in years, mainly driven by migrant workers coming to the province to work in factories. Population growth was 1.95% in 2005, between 2.5% from 2008 to 2010 and 3.5% in 2011. Net migration contributed 2.2% to this figure.

According to the Vietnam Fatherland Front Committee of Đồng Nai Province (now the Vietnam Fatherland Front Committee of Đồng Nai City), in 2025 the province had approximately 2.65 million adherents of 11 religions and 43 active religious organizations. Đồng Nai was reported to have the largest number of religious adherents among Vietnam's provinces and municipalities. Specifically, there were more than 1.31 million Catholics, over 1 million Buddhists, and more than 80,000 Protestants.

The population of Đồng Nai is primarily the dominant Kinh (Viet) ethnicity, although there are residents of the Han Chinese, Stieng, Mạ, Nùng, Tay, and Cham minorities.

== Infrastructure ==
=== Transportation ===
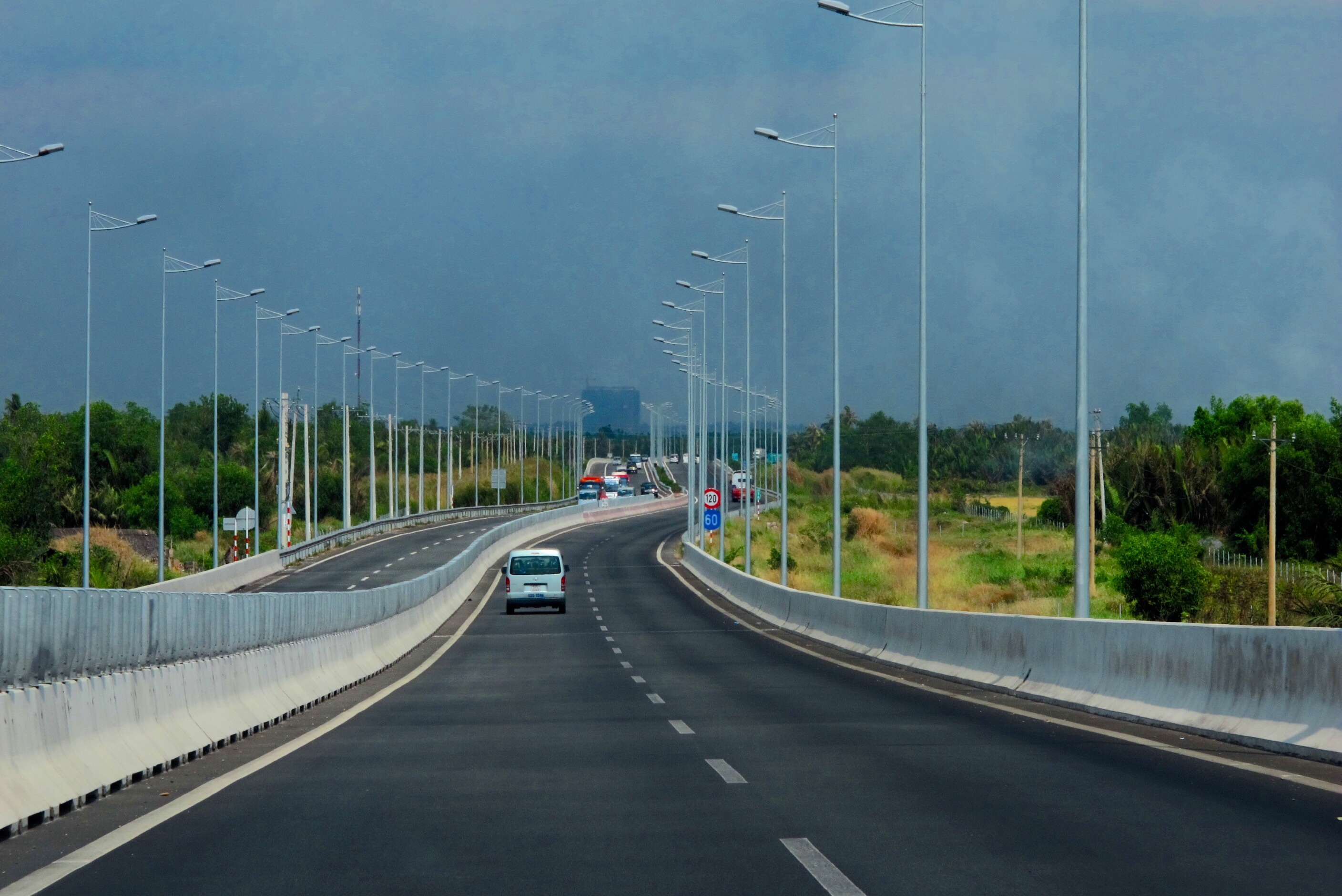
Hồ Chí Minh City - Long Thành - Dầu Giây Expressway.

Đồng Nai serves as a key transportation hub in southern Vietnam due to its strategic location adjacent to Ho Chi Minh City and lying along several major national transport corridors. The province is traversed by a dense network of roads, railways, and future air routes, facilitating both domestic and international connectivity.

Road transport is particularly well-developed, with National Highway 1A, National Highway 20, and National Highway 51 running through province, linking it to neighbor cities. The Ho Chi Minh City - Long Thành - Dầu Giây Expressway significantly reduces travel time between Đồng Nai and Ho Chi Minh City, while also forming part of the North-South Expressway network. In addition, several provincial roads support intra-provincial mobility and rural access.

Under scheme in the near future, highways to and Ho Chi Minh City, a railway connecting Biên Hòa to Vũng Tàu, upgrading provincial road No. 726 and connecting National Highway No. 20 and No. 1 with National Highway No. 51 will create a complete system, promoting socioeconomic development in the province and region.

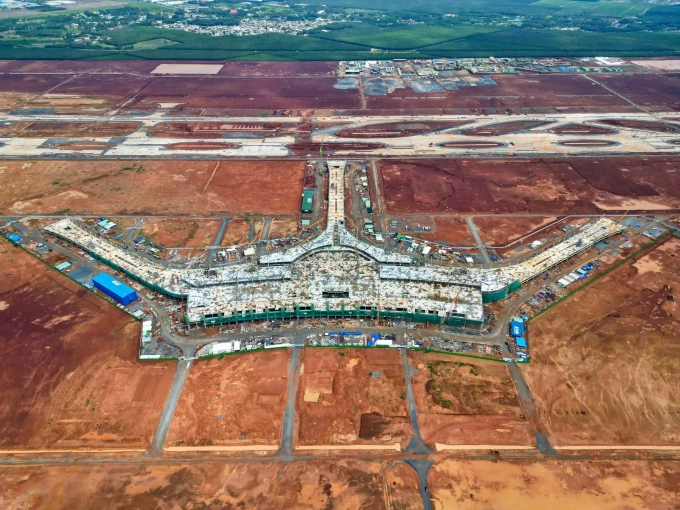
Long Thanh International Airport is under construction.

A major future infrastructure project is Long Thanh International Airport, currently under construction. Once completed, it is expected to become one of the Southeast Asia's largest airports, significantly easing the road on Tân Sơn Nhất International Airport and transforming Đồng Nai into a global air logistics center. Planned in multiple phases, the airport's first phase is expected to be completed by 2026, with an initial capacity of 25 million passengers and 1.2 million tons of cargo per year. Upon full completion, Long Thành International Airport will be able to handle 100 million passengers and 5 million tons of cargo annually.

=== Industrial parks ===
Đồng Nai is one of the Vietnam's most dynamic industrial regions, with over 35 industrial parks, covering approximately 12.000+ hectares, with 30 currently operational and an average occupancy rate of 82%.

==== Notable industrial parks ====
- Biên Hoà 1 Industrial Park - the first industrial park in Vietnam. As part of the urban redevelopment plan, Biên Hoà 1 Industrial Park will be transformed into a core area serving as the provincial administrative, political, and economic center.
- Amata Industrial Park
- Long Đức Industrial Park
- Nhơn Trạch Industrial Park

=== Free Trade Zone (FTZ) & Airport-Area Development ===
In early 2025, Đồng Nai initiated planning for a free trade zone (FTZ) surrounding the upcoming Long Thành International Airport and linked to Phước An Sea Port. According to the People's Committee of Đồng Nai Province, the free trade zone will integrate four functional zones: Manufacturing (3.095 hectares), logistics (2.244 hectares), finance and trade services (1.500 hectares), innovation research and digital economy (1.419 hectares).

== Administrative subdivisions ==
Following the provincial and municipal merger program in Vietnam in 2025, Đồng Nai and Bình Phước were consolidated into a single administrative unit, officially designated as the new Đồng Nai Province.

Đồng Nai Province was reformed into a municipality called as Đồng Nai Municipality in April 2026. Đồng Nai is subdivided into 33 wards and 62 communes.

List of administrative subdivisions of Đồng Nai Municipality

Name	Area (km²)	Population
Wards (33)
An Lộc	88,74	35.870
Bảo Vinh	50,85	36.732
Biên Hòa	21,46	86.267
Bình Long	49,14	41.398
Bình Lộc	77,21	36.964
Bình Phước	86,38	115.378
Chơn Thành	124,41	43.658
Dầu Giây	98,87	72.004
Đồng Phú	138,66	49.297
Đồng Xoài	81,33	38.419
Hàng Gòn	45,60	25.170
Hố Nai	22,85	86.085
Long Bình	44,91	230.996
Long Hưng	32,40	76.128
Long Khánh	21,32	79.449
Long Thành	130,12	95.992
Lộc Ninh	67,51	32.291
Minh Hưng	99,67	37.096
Nhơn Trạch	108,24	156.839
Phước Bình	72,57	45.801
Phước Long	71,87	33.005
Phước Tân	42,82	78.277
Tam Hiệp	10,81	152.515
Tam Phước	45,09	61.360

Name	Area (km²)	Population
Tân Khai	161,79	37.777
Tân Phú	105,81	77.153
Tân Triều	63,29	112.454
Trảng Bom	68,77	95.502
Trảng Dài	37,29	137.951
Trấn Biên	31,03	201.946
Trị An	660,46	51.832
Xuân Lập	29,19	19.390
Xuân Lộc	140,50	105.897
Communes (62)
An Phước	58,32	65.750
An Viễn	47,74	27.058
Bàu Hàm	97,50	56.208
Bình An	59,41	26.396
Bình Minh	36,68	86.267
Bình Tân	190,89	28.734
Bom Bo	245,87	27.552
Bù Đăng	156,14	34.358
Bù Gia Mập	342,51	8.558
Cẩm Mỹ	113,14	46.103
Đa Kia	196,25	32.173
Đại Phước	98,02	56.123
Đak Lua	415,13	8.308
Đak Nhau	182,47	24.529

Name	Area (km²)	Population
Đak Ơ	246,49	19.858
Định Quán	295,82	86.548
Đồng Tâm	248,72	36.351
Gia Kiệm	82,72	80.043
Hưng Phước	187,19	13.214
Hưng Thịnh	57,64	60.872
La Ngà	133,45	33.442
Long Hà	168,38	28.156
Long Phước	81,83	43.777
Lộc Hưng	99,02	26.958
Lộc Quang	104,95	26.732
Lộc Tấn	183,36	23.697
Lộc Thành	206,10	15.558
Lộc Thạnh	125,49	10.571
Minh Đức	167,11	17.343
Nam Cát Tiên	82,93	16.198
Nghĩa Trung	222,04	34.514
Nha Bích	137,06	23.938
Phú Hòa	61,53	37.059
Phú Lâm	67,35	62.517
Phú Lý	279,00	16.137
Phú Nghĩa	279,40	34.649
Phú Riềng	117,37	36.804
Phú Trung	172,03	13.935

Name	Area (km²)	Population
Phú Vinh	69,45	31.660
Phước An	170,72	87.605
Phước Sơn	386,56	31.262
Phước Thái	85,86	55.230
Sông Ray	65,60	31.478
Tà Lài	83,34	34.644
Tân An	80,24	40.281
Tân Hưng	204,66	35.888
Tân Lợi	379,78	14.705
Tân Quan	148,31	30.357
Tân Tiến	147,47	30.889
Thanh Sơn	315,40	33.717
Thiện Hưng	110,97	35.619
Thọ Sơn	307,69	21.962
Thống Nhất	120,07	72.759
Thuận Lợi	167,23	24.301
Xuân Bắc	96,44	45.194
Xuân Định	52,29	37.022
Xuân Đông	107,97	47.052
Xuân Đường	82,11	26.948
Xuân Hòa	305,96	80.480
Xuân Phú	55,63	29.808
Xuân Quế	92,91	21.411
Xuân Thành	122,71	22.327

== Economy ==
Đồng Nai is one of Vietnam's main manufacturing centers and one of the most developed provinces.

Đồng Nai is one of Vietnam's manufacturing centers.

=== Agriculture ===
Despite its strong focus on industrial development, Đồng Nai still has a substantial agricultural sector. Agricultural land accounts for 47% of the province's area as of 2011, a total of 277,600 ha. This is lower than in other provinces in the Southeast region, except for Ho Chi Minh City. Cereals were grown on 118,600 ha in 2011, an area that has been decreasing gradually in recent years, from 139,300 ha in 2005. The output of rice has, however, remained stable and was at 335,200t in 2011. The province also produced 305,300t of maize, making it the largest producer of maize outside the country's mountainous regions and contributing 6.3% to the national maize output. Đồng Nai also produced 619,700t of sugar cane (3.5% of the national output), sweet potatoes and cassava.

Agricultural land accounts for 47% of the province's area as of 2011, a total of 277,600 ha. This is lower than in other provinces in the Southeast region, except for Ho Chi Minh City. Cereals were grown on 118,600 ha in 2011, an area that has been decreasing gradually in years, from 139,300 ha in 2005. The output of rice was at 335,200t in 2011. The province also produced 305,300t of maize, making it the largest producer of maize outside the country's mountainous regions and contributing 6.3% to the national maize output. Đồng Nai also produced 619,700t of sugar cane (3.5% of the national output), sweet potatoes and cassava.

Đồng Nai is the largest livestock producer among Vietnam's provinces and there are plans to further invest in the sector. The government reserved 15,000 ha for livestock farming in 2012, mostly for poultry and pigs. In 2011 there were 1.33 million pigs and 10.655 million poultry. Despite not being located along the coast, Đồng Nai produced 41,600t of fishery products in 2011. Over 90% of this was produced in 33,500 ha of aquaculture farms. This makes Đồng Nai the largest aquaculture producer outside the Mekong Delta.

=== Industry ===
Đồng Nai has attracted 9.1% of FDI into Vietnam by 2011, an accumulated US$18.2 billion, the fourth largest after Ho Chi Minh City, Bà Rịa–Vũng Tàu province and Hanoi. Industrial gross output in 2011 was VND 314 trillion, 10.6% of the national value. It has received a range of FDI projects, including a Bosch auto component plant, a Toshiba motor plant, a PepsiCo beverage factory, a Posco steel plant, and a Nestlé coffee factory.

In 2025, Đồng Nai's Industrial Production Index (IIP) increased by 15.22% compared to 2024. Đồng Nai ranks among the leading provinces in Vietnam in attracting foreign direct investment (FDI). As of the end of 2025, the province had more than 2,200 active FDI projects with a total registered capital exceeding US$42 billion from 51 countries and territories. Among them, South Korea, China, Japan, Taiwan, and Singapore were the leading investors in terms of both the number of projects and total investment capital.

== Geography ==
Đồng Nai is in southeastern Vietnam and bordered by Ho Chi Minh City (Saigon), Tây Ninh, Lâm Đồng, and Cambodia. Đồng Nai has an advanced traffic system with many backbone national roads crossing it, such as: National Route 1A, National Route 20, National Route 51 and the North–South railway lines; located adjacent to the Saigon Port and Tan Son Nhat International Airport, it offers many advantages to economic activities in the area. Its location is very important for the development of the Southern economic main hub and a junction of the South Eastern and Tây Nguyên Highland.

Đồng Nai is based essentially on the system of lakes, dams and rivers, of which Trị An Lake with an area of 323 km^{2} and over 60 rivers, rivulets and canals are very favorable for the development of a number of aquatic products: raft bred fish and shrimp. The seasonal tropical forests are protected in Cát Tiên National Park, located in the north of Đồng Nai and the adjacent Vĩnh Cửu Nature Reserve; the former has been recognized internationally as a significant biosphere reserve. From the mountainous area, Đồng Nai River, Vietnam's largest internal waterway, flows southeast through Biên Hòa City, Ho Chi Minh City, and villages along its way. This river plays a crucial role in providing fresh water for the entire region.

=== Climate ===
Đồng Nai lies in the monsoon tropical zone and is affected by the north-east and south-west monsoon. It is also under the influence of the Pacific Ocean tropical atmosphere between April and October. The climate is divided into two distinct seasons: the rainy season lasts from March or April to November, and the dry season from December to March or April of the following year. The average temperature is between 23.9 and 29.0 °C, much lower than the standard level of tropical regions (26–30 °C). Its annual rainfall is quite high with 1,500 – 2,700 mm.

On average, the weather is sunny for 4.0–9.5 hours a day and does not exceed 11.5 hours per day, even on the hottest and sunniest days. Total rainy days within a year are between 120 and 170 days (the standard level of tropical regions is 150–160 days) with a total rainfall of some 1,500 – 2,750 mm. The average humidity is around 80 – 82% and humidity in the dry season is 10–12%, lower than that of the rainy season; humidity varies considerably between areas.

Đồng Nai's weather with regular sunshine, rain, and high humidity, equally found in the localities, facilitates agricultural production and development of industrial, cultural and tourist activities.

=== Resources ===
Đồng Nai is plentiful with resources such as forests, granite mines, construction stone, clay, kaolin, pozzolan, sand and gravel.

== Business environment ==
On Vietnam's Provincial Competitiveness Index 2023, a key tool for evaluating the business environment in Vietnam’s provinces, Dong Nai received a score of 66.28. This was an improvement from 2022 in which the province received a score of 65.67. In 2023, the province received its highest scores on the 'Time Costs' and 'Business Support Policy' criterion and lowest on 'Policy Bias' and 'Labour Policy'.

== Education ==
=== Notable High Schools & K-12 Schools ===
- Lương Thế Vinh High School for the Gifted
- Ngô Quyền High School
- Trấn Biên High School

=== Universities and Colleges ===
- Lạc Hồng University
- Đồng Nai University
- Vietnam Police Fire Prevention & Fighting University (T06/K56) campus Southern
- Vietnam People's Security University (T04/T47) campus in Đồng Nai province
- Second Army Officer University school – Nguyễn Huệ University
- Vietnam People's Security College (T08)
- Branch of Vietnam National University of Forestry in Đồng Nai province
- Miền Đông University of Technology
- Đồng Nai University of Technology
- Lê Quý Đôn College
- Technology and Management Sonadezi College
- Đồng Nai Technical College
- Đồng Nai Medical College
- University of Medicine and Pharmacy at Hồ Chí Minh City - Đồng Nai Campus

In January 2025, Đồng Nai approved zoning for the 96.67-hectare Nuclear Science & Technology Research Center in Hàng Gòn. Managed by the Ministry of Science and Technology, it will host a 10MWt research reactor, specialized labs, and serve around 800-1,000 nuclear experts. The center aims to produce medical radioisotopes, conduct semiconductor irradiation, train skilled nuclear personnel, and established it as the secondary national center for nuclear medicine. It is a part of bilateral collaboration with Rosatom, featured in an MoU signed mid-2024.

== International Relations ==
=== Twin towns - sister cities ===
- Champasak, Laos
- Gyeongsangnam-do, South Korea

=== Cooperation and friendship ===
- Vila Nova de Gaia, Portugal
- Kobe City, Japan
- Pinar Del Rio, Cuba
- Kansai Region, Japan
- Nanjing, China
- Arkansas, USA
- Virginia, USA
- Oklahoma, USA
