= Hoàng Mai =

Hoàng Mai may refer to:

- Hoàng Mai, Hanoi: a ward in the former Hoàng Mai district
- Hoàng Mai, Nghệ An: a ward in the former Hoàng Mai town
- Hoàng Mai district: a former district of Hanoi, dissolved in 2025 as part of the 2025 Vietnamese administrative reform
- Hoàng Mai (town): a former district-level town of Nghệ An province, dissolved in 2025 as part of the 2025 Vietnamese administrative reform

== See also ==
- Hoang Mai, politician in Québec
