= Ninh Hải (disambiguation) =

Ninh Hải may refer to:

- Ninh Hải, a commune of Khánh Hòa province
- Ninh Hải district, a former district in Ninh Thuận Province, Vietnam
- Ninh Hải, Ninh Hòa, a former ward in Ninh Hòa, Khanh Hoa Province, Vietnam
