= Mường Lay (town) =

- District-level town (Class-4)
- Mường Lay Town; Thị xã Mường Lay
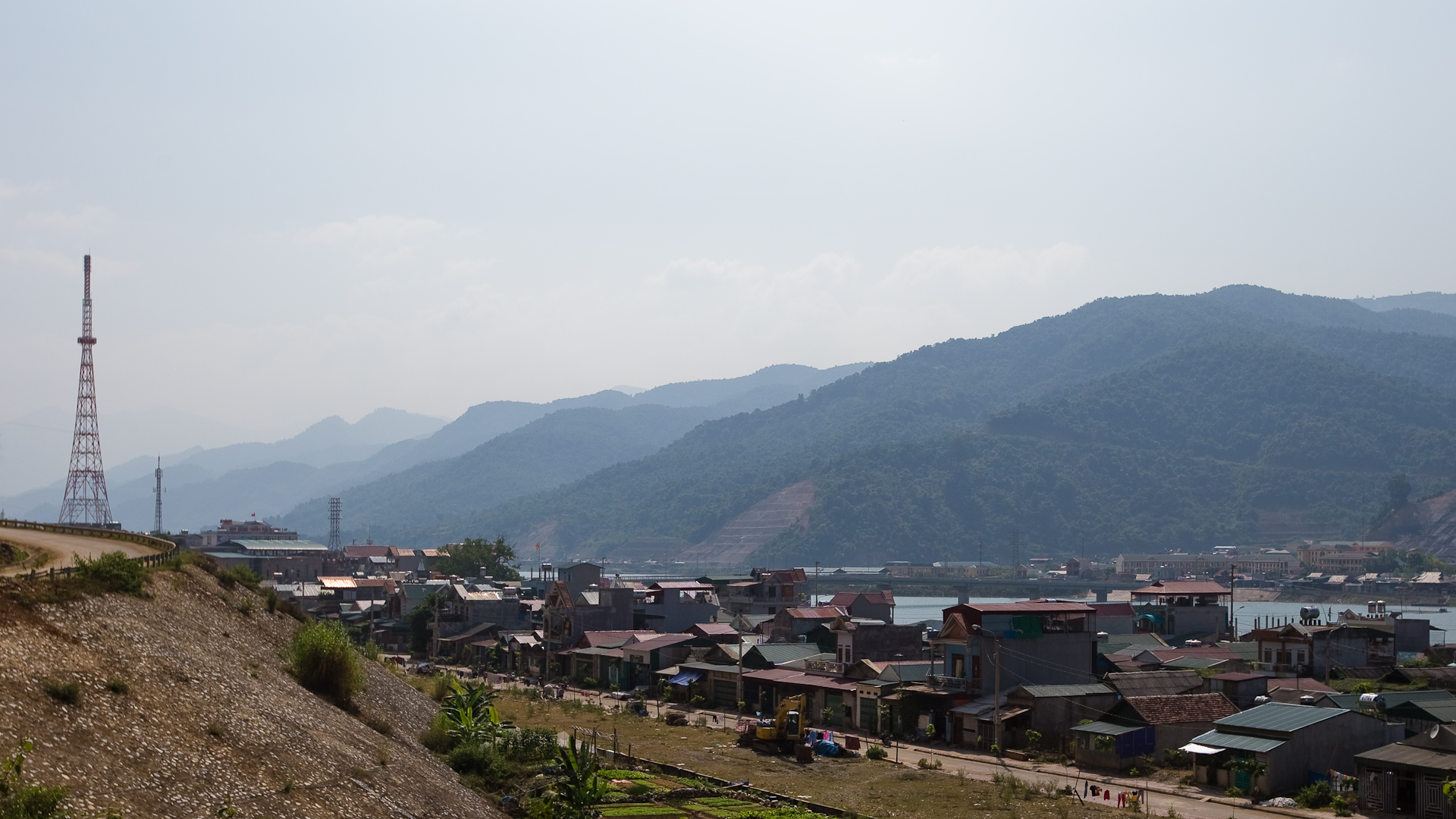

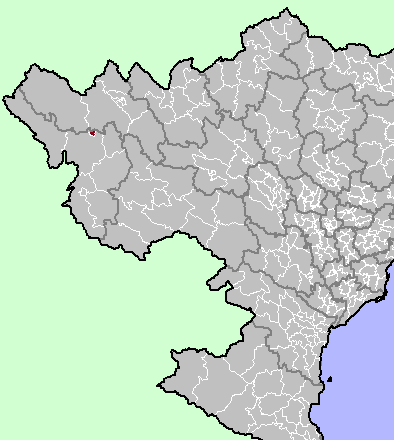
- Location in northern Vietnam

- Location in Vietnam
- Coordinates: 22°4′4″N 103°9′2″E
- Country: Vietnam
- Region: Northwest
- Province: Điện Biên
- Established: 8 October 1971

Area
  - District-level town (Class-4): 114.035 km^{2} (44.029 sq mi)
  - Urban: 52.41 km^{2} (20.24 sq mi)

Population (2018)
  - District-level town (Class-4): 20,450
  - Density: 180/km^{2} (470/sq mi)
  - Urban: 13,190
  - Urban density: 251.7/km^{2} (651.8/sq mi)
- Time zone: UTC+7 (UTC + 7)
- Climate: Cwa

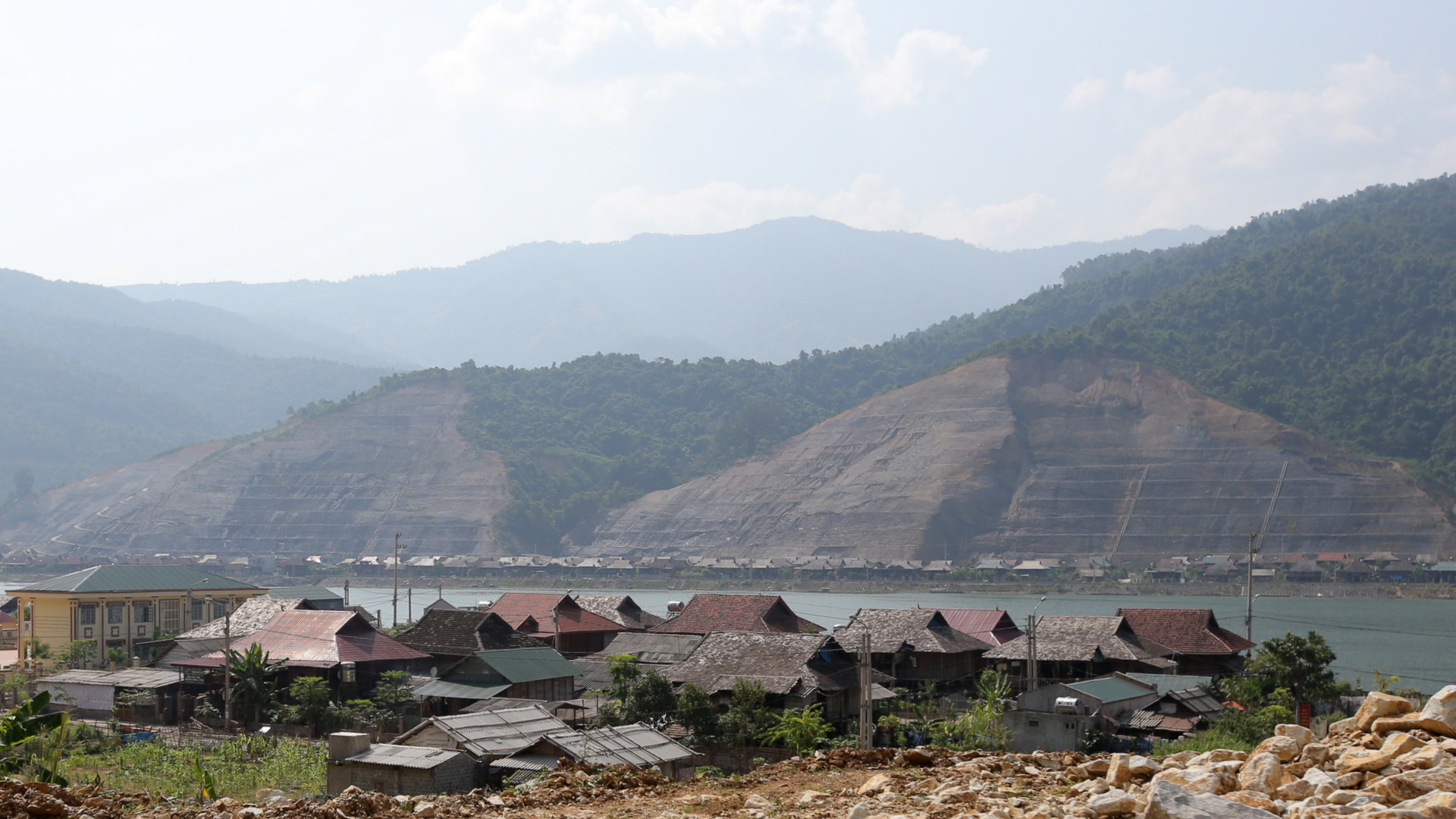
Mường Lay

Mường Lay is a former town of Điện Biên Province in the Northwest region of Vietnam.

== Administrative divisions ==
Muong Cha has 3 administrative units, including two wards (phường) and one commune (xã):

- Sông Đà (ward)
- Na Lay (ward)
- Lay Nưa (commune)

== Climate ==
Climate data for Lai Châu station, Mường Lay elevation 243 m (797 ft)
Month	Jan	Feb	Mar	Apr	May	Jun	Jul	Aug	Sep	Oct	Nov	Dec	Year
Record high °C (°F)	34.3 (93.7)	38.0 (100.4)	39.6 (103.3)	41.9 (107.4)	42.5 (108.5)	39.8 (103.6)	39.8 (103.6)	38.9 (102.0)	37.0 (98.6)	36.4 (97.5)	34.3 (93.7)	32.9 (91.2)	42.5 (108.5)
Mean daily maximum °C (°F)	23.4 (74.1)	26.2 (79.2)	29.9 (85.8)	32.5 (90.5)	32.8 (91.0)	31.8 (89.2)	31.4 (88.5)	32.1 (89.8)	32.0 (89.6)	30.0 (86.0)	26.6 (79.9)	23.6 (74.5)	29.4 (84.9)
Daily mean °C (°F)	17.2 (63.0)	18.9 (66.0)	22.1 (71.8)	24.9 (76.8)	26.4 (79.5)	26.7 (80.1)	26.5 (79.7)	26.7 (80.1)	26.1 (79.0)	24.0 (75.2)	20.6 (69.1)	17.5 (63.5)	23.1 (73.6)
Mean daily minimum °C (°F)	13.8 (56.8)	14.7 (58.5)	17.2 (63.0)	20.3 (68.5)	22.5 (72.5)	23.9 (75.0)	23.9 (75.0)	23.8 (74.8)	22.8 (73.0)	20.5 (68.9)	17.4 (63.3)	14.2 (57.6)	19.6 (67.3)
Record low °C (°F)	3.4 (38.1)	7.1 (44.8)	8.1 (46.6)	12.9 (55.2)	14.1 (57.4)	18.2 (64.8)	20.1 (68.2)	19.1 (66.4)	16.4 (61.5)	10.0 (50.0)	7.5 (45.5)	3.6 (38.5)	3.4 (38.1)
Average rainfall mm (inches)	31.4 (1.24)	33.2 (1.31)	62.3 (2.45)	137.7 (5.42)	276.8 (10.90)	426.7 (16.80)	478.7 (18.85)	363.5 (14.31)	150.8 (5.94)	86.1 (3.39)	52.4 (2.06)	27.2 (1.07)	2,126.6 (83.72)
Average rainy days	5.1	4.8	7.5	13.0	19.4	23.7	25.2	21.6	13.0	9.4	6.7	5.3	154.8
Average relative humidity (%)	80.6	76.4	74.5	76.5	79.9	85.3	87.0	86.0	84.0	83.8	83.8	83.1	81.7
Mean monthly sunshine hours	129.4	148.2	179.3	198.2	178.1	118.0	123.3	152.2	162.7	151.6	140.7	131.1	1,823.6
Source: Vietnam Institute for Building Science and Technology
