= Chơn Thành (town) =

Coordinates: 11°25′45″N 106°39′26″E

- District-level town (Class-4)
- Chơn Thành Town; Thị xã Chơn Thành
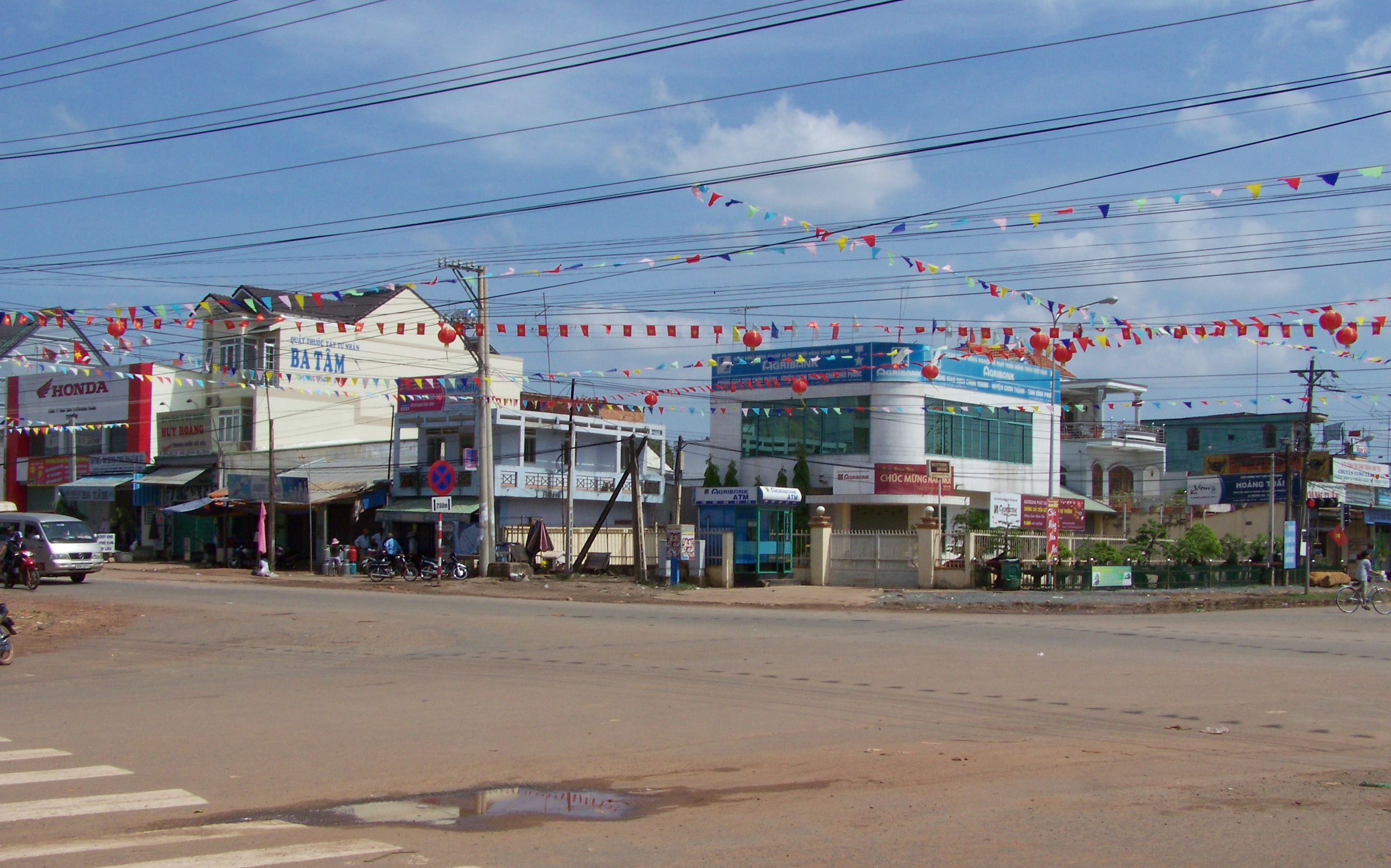
- Interactive map of Chơn Thành
- Country: Vietnam
- Region: Southeast
- Province: Bình Phước
- Seat: Hưng Long

Area
  - District-level town (Class-4): 150.71 sq mi (390.34 km^{2})
  - Urban: 86.51 sq mi (224.06 km^{2})

Population (2021)
  - District-level town (Class-4): 121,083
  - Density: 803.41/sq mi (310.20/km^{2})
  - Urban: 94,820
  - Urban density: 1,096/sq mi (423.2/km^{2})
- Time zone: UTC+07:00 (Indochina Time)

Chơn Thành was a former town of Bình Phước province, in the region of Vietnam. As of 2021 the town had a population of 121,083. The town covers an area of 390.34 km^{2}. The town seat lies at Hưng Long ward.

Chơn Thành was formerly a rural district of Bình Phước province. It gained town status on August 11, 2022.

The stream Ông Thành was the location of the Battle of Ông Thành in the Vietnam War.
