= Urban areas of Vietnam =

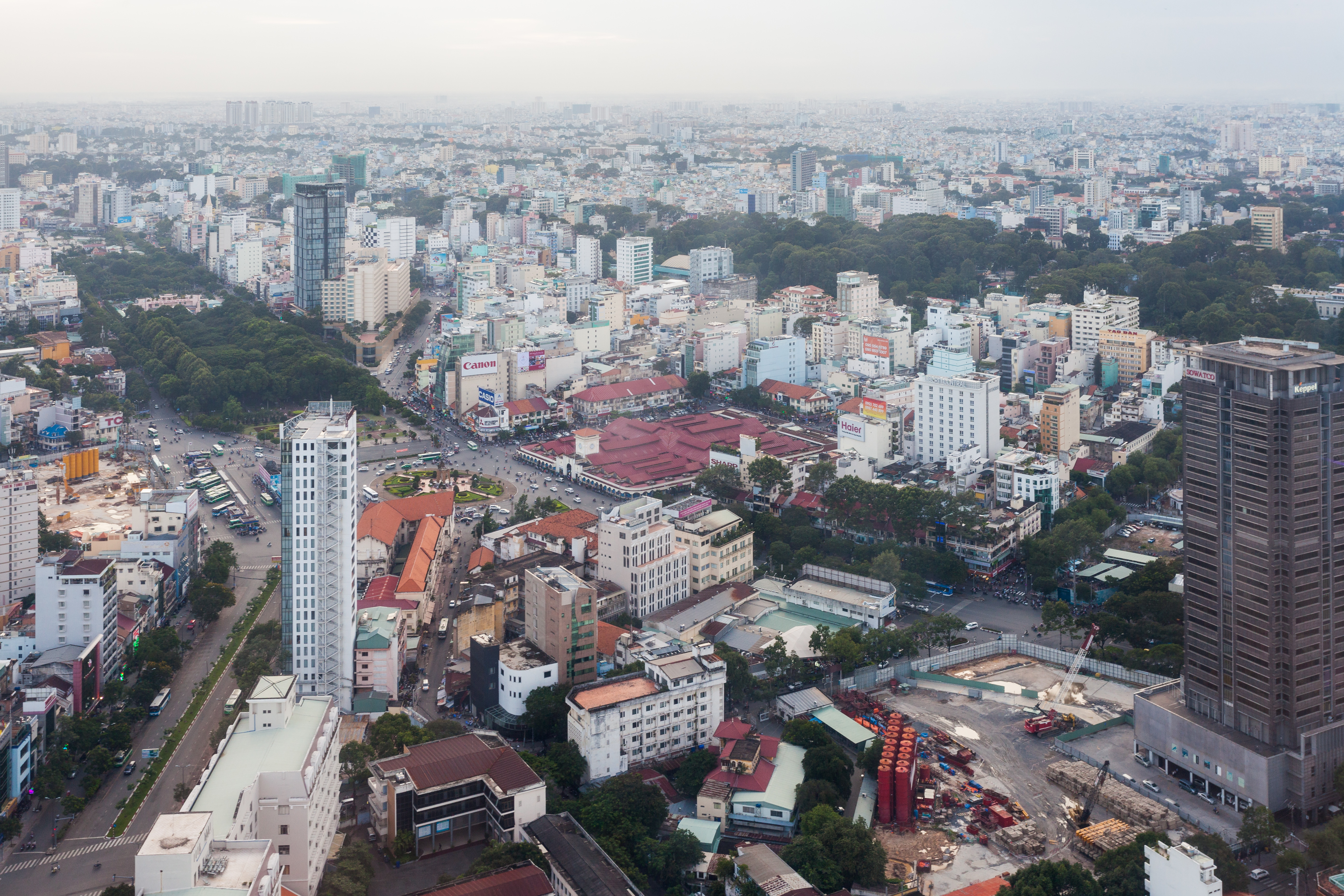
View of Ho Chi Minh City from Bitexco Financial Tower, Vietnam

Urban areas in Vietnam (Vietnamese: Đô thị Việt Nam) include cities, district-level town, and commune-level town officially recognized by state authorities of Vietnam. While districts and communes are generally rural, some may be classified as urban if they meet certain conditions. Communes set to be upgraded to towns can also be recognized as type V urban areas. Vietnam's cities are classified into six types: special, type I to type V. Special, type I, and type II cities are approved by the prime minister; type III and IV cities by the Ministry of Construction; and type V by the provincial government. The classification process is overseen by the National Assembly's Standing Committee.

== Types of urban areas ==
As of August 16, 2024, there are 908 recognized urban areas in Vietnam , classified as follows:

- Special: 2 (Hanoi and Ho Chi Minh City)
- Type I: 21
- Type II: 39
- Type III: 43
- Type IV: 97
- Type V: 706

== Criteria for classification ==
The classification of urban areas in Vietnam is based on a series of factors, including population, density, and the proportion of non-agricultural labor. The classification framework is outlined in Resolution No. 1210/2016, which provides the following criteria for each type of urban area:

Criteria	Special	Type I	Type II	Type III	Type IV	Type V
Population (Total)	5,000,000+	1,000,000+ (municipality) / 500,000+ (municipal city/provincial city)	200,000+	100,000+	50,000+	4,000+
Population (Inner City)	3,000,000+	500,000+ (municipality) / 200,000+ (municipal city/provincial city)	100,000+	50,000+	20,000+	N/A
Population Density (Total)	3,000 people/km^{2}+	2,000 people/km^{2}+	1,800 people/km^{2}+	1,400 people/km^{2}+	1,200 people/km^{2}+	1,000 people/km^{2}+
Population Density (Inner)	12,000 people/km^{2}+	10,000 people/km^{2}+	8,000 people/km^{2}+	7,000 people/km^{2}+	6,000 people/km^{2}+	5,000 people/km^{2}+
Non-Agricultural Labor	70%+ (90%+ inner city)	65%+ (85%+ inner city)	65%+ (80%+ inner city)	60%+ (75%+ inner city)	55%+ (70%+ inner city)	55%+
Role and Function	National/international hubs	National/regional centers	Provincial centers	Provincial economic hubs	District-level centers	Administrative centers
Approval authority	Prime Minister	Prime Minister	Ministry of Construction	Ministry of Construction	Ministry of Construction	Provincial People's Committee

Currently, Vietnam has two cities classified as special urban areas by the government: Hanoi and Ho Chi Minh City. To support the authorities of these two cities in fulfilling their functions as special urban areas, the government allows Hanoi and Ho Chi Minh City to benefit from certain specific financial and budgetary mechanisms.

== Urban areas in special regions ==
In special cases, such as border areas or island regions, urban classification criteria are relaxed. These areas may have lower population and density thresholds but must still meet the majority of the other standards set for their respective classification. For example:

- Mountainous and border regions: May have lower population density, but must meet at least 70% of the required standards.
- Islands: Must meet 50% of the infrastructure and architectural standards, while population and socio-economic standards are reduced to 30%.

== See also ==
- List of cities in Vietnam
- Provincial city (Vietnam)
- District-level town
- Commune-level town
