= Ba Đồn (town) =

- District-level town (Class-4)
- Ba Đồn Town; Thị xã Ba Đồn
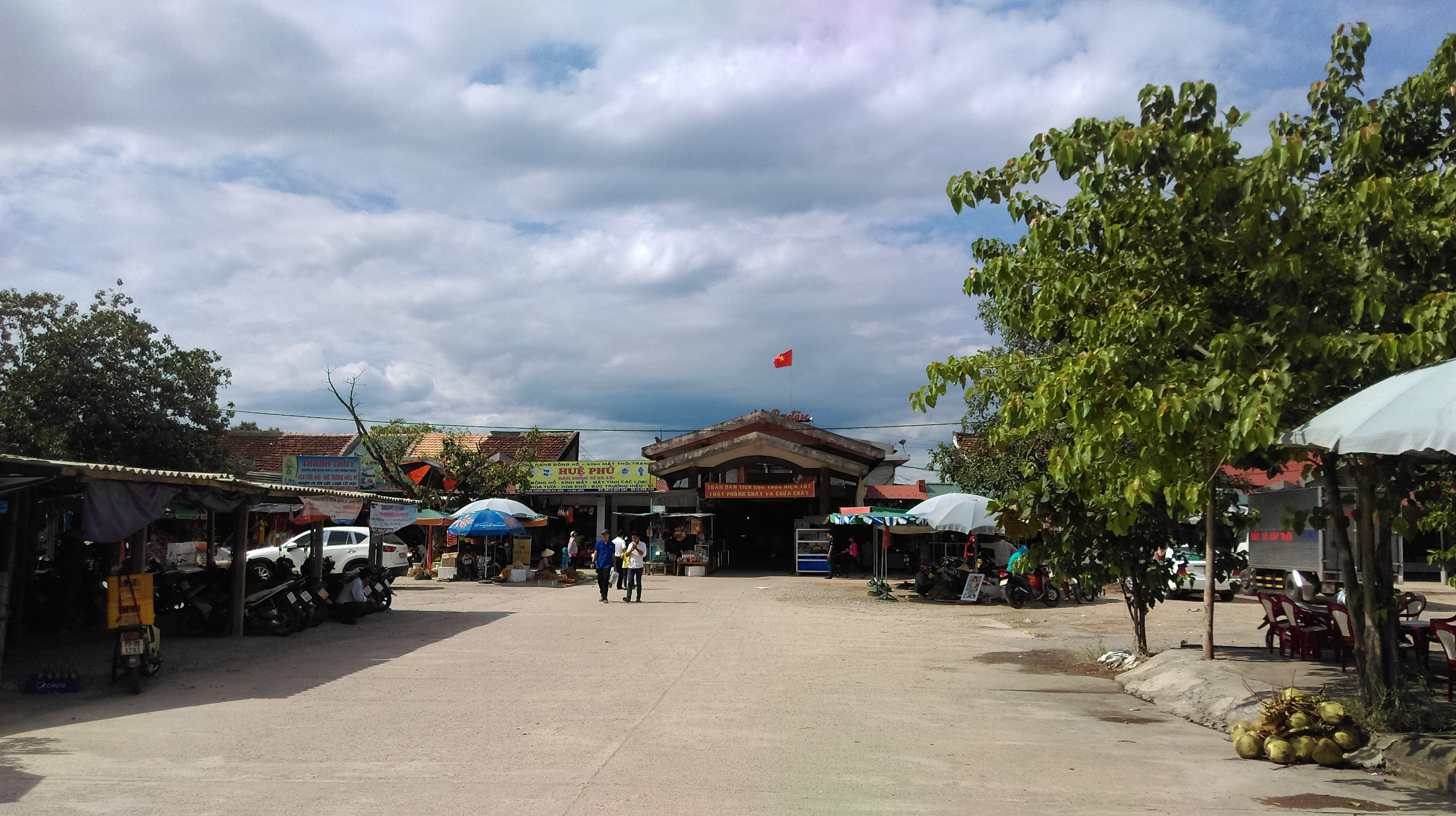
- Interactive map of Ba Đồn
- Location within Vietnam Location within Southeast Asia Location within Asia
- Coordinates: 17°45′17″N 106°25′23″E
- Country: Vietnam
- Province: Quảng Bình

Area
  - Total: 63 sq mi (162 km^{2})

Population (2019)
  - Total: 134,000
- Time zone: UTC+7 (Indochina Time)

Ba Đồn is a former town (thị xã) in Quảng Bình Province, Vietnam. The town is equal to a huyện and is located on National Route 1, about 40 km north of the provincial capital, Đồng Hới. The township is the commercial and service centre serving surrounding rural areas. Ba Đồn was incorporated into a 3rd municipality (town or thị xã) including some neighboring communes of Quảng Trạch District on December 20, 2013.

Ba Đồn has an area of 163.1828 km^{2} and its population in 2013 was 115,196. In 2012, Ba Đồn was recognised as a class IV municipality.

== Geography ==
Ba Don Town includes 6 urban wards (phường):

1. Ba Đồn
2. Quảng Thọ
3. Quảng Long
4. Quảng Thuận
5. Quảng Phong
6. Quảng Phúc

10 rural communes (xã):

1. Quảng Minh
2. Quảng Sơn
3. Quảng Thủy
4. Quảng Hòa
5. Quảng Lộc
6. Quảng Văn
7. Quảng Tân
8. Quảng Trung
9. Quảng Tiên
10. Quảng Hải

== Climate ==
Climate data for Ba Đồn
Month	Jan	Feb	Mar	Apr	May	Jun	Jul	Aug	Sep	Oct	Nov	Dec	Year
Record high °C (°F)	34.7 (94.5)	36.0 (96.8)	39.5 (103.1)	43.2 (109.8)	41.4 (106.5)	40.2 (104.4)	40.6 (105.1)	39.7 (103.5)	39.0 (102.2)	35.3 (95.5)	34.7 (94.5)	32.5 (90.5)	43.2 (109.8)
Mean daily maximum °C (°F)	21.6 (70.9)	22.4 (72.3)	25.0 (77.0)	29.1 (84.4)	32.6 (90.7)	34.2 (93.6)	34.2 (93.6)	33.3 (91.9)	31.1 (88.0)	28.3 (82.9)	25.4 (77.7)	22.5 (72.5)	28.3 (82.9)
Daily mean °C (°F)	18.6 (65.5)	19.5 (67.1)	21.7 (71.1)	24.9 (76.8)	28.0 (82.4)	29.8 (85.6)	29.7 (85.5)	28.9 (84.0)	27.2 (81.0)	25.0 (77.0)	22.3 (72.1)	19.5 (67.1)	24.6 (76.3)
Mean daily minimum °C (°F)	16.6 (61.9)	17.7 (63.9)	19.7 (67.5)	22.6 (72.7)	25.0 (77.0)	26.5 (79.7)	26.5 (79.7)	25.9 (78.6)	24.6 (76.3)	22.7 (72.9)	20.2 (68.4)	17.4 (63.3)	22.1 (71.8)
Record low °C (°F)	6.1 (43.0)	9.1 (48.4)	7.8 (46.0)	13.4 (56.1)	18.1 (64.6)	20.4 (68.7)	21.7 (71.1)	21.3 (70.3)	18.0 (64.4)	16.0 (60.8)	9.1 (48.4)	7.6 (45.7)	6.1 (43.0)
Average precipitation mm (inches)	51.9 (2.04)	33.5 (1.32)	38.6 (1.52)	51.2 (2.02)	111.1 (4.37)	89.0 (3.50)	88.7 (3.49)	172.5 (6.79)	420.0 (16.54)	605.6 (23.84)	257.4 (10.13)	97.7 (3.85)	2,009.4 (79.11)
Average rainy days	11.1	10.8	10.8	8.1	9.7	7.0	7.3	10.6	15.2	18.2	15.9	12.8	138.9
Average relative humidity (%)	88.5	89.6	89.1	87.0	81.4	74.8	73.4	77.8	84.9	87.2	86.8	86.9	83.9
Mean monthly sunshine hours	88.0	74.7	103.2	158.8	222.7	218.2	230.4	197.0	158.3	129.4	98.3	76.7	1,759.7
Source: Vietnam Institute for Building Science and Technology
