= 2025 Vietnamese administrative reforms =

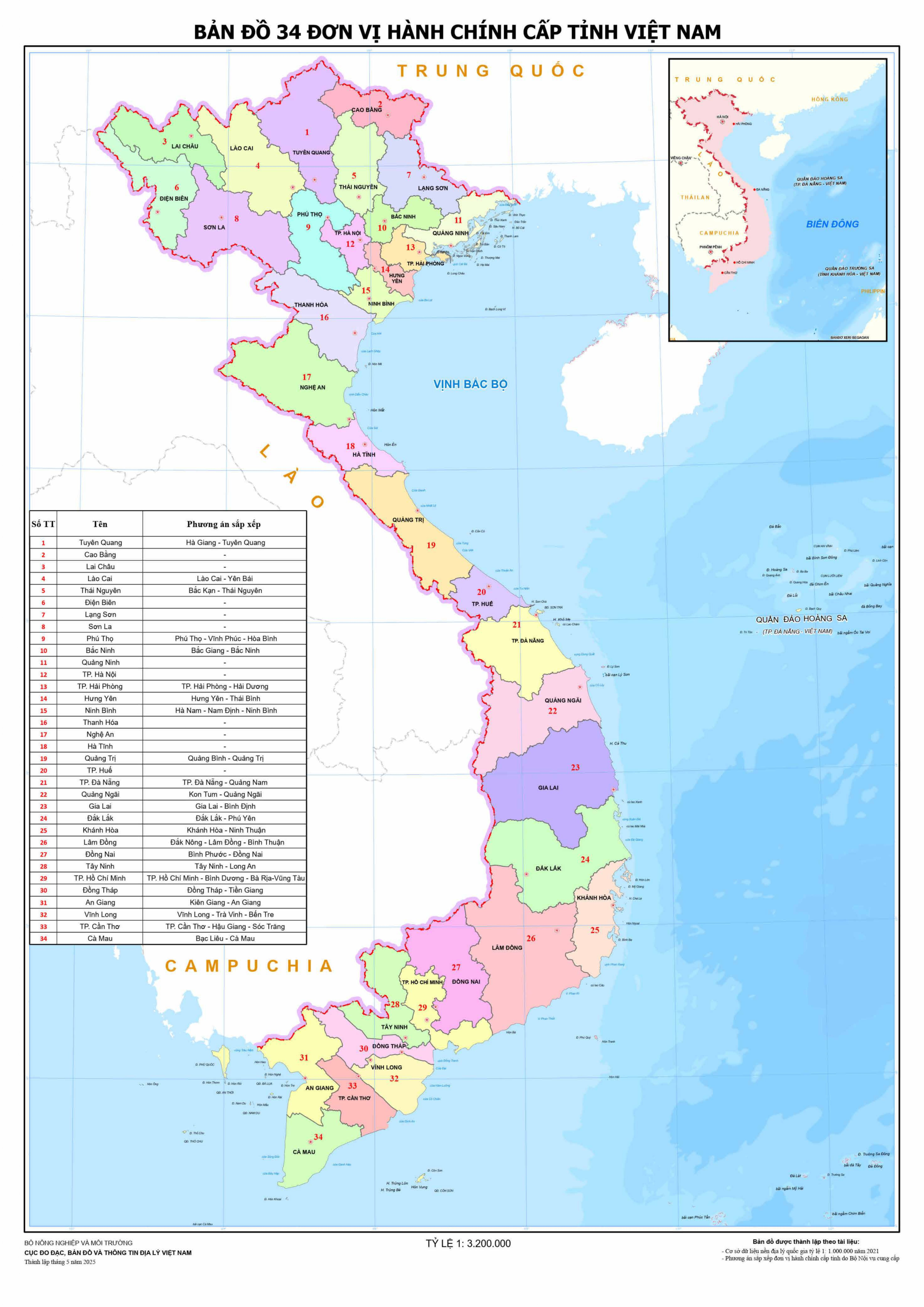
The 2025 subdivisions of Vietnam after the re-arrangement.

As part of broader institutional reforms in 2024 and 2025, the Communist Party and Government of Vietnam announced the Plan to Arrange and Merge Administrative Units (Vietnamese: Phương án sắp xếp và sáp nhập đơn vị hành chính, lit. 'Project for [re]organising and merging administrative units'). As part of the re-organisation, district-level units were to be eliminated and the number of local government units at the provincial and communal levels were to be reduced by around 50%. A constitutional amendment will be required to eliminate the district level of local authorities. It is also considered a transition period to revise the Vietnamese constitution and legal system. On 1 July 2025, Vietnam implemented its most extensive administrative reform in decades, merging 63 provinces and cities down to 34 first-level subdivisions and eliminating the district level entirely.

== Background ==
Beginning on 5 November 2024, state media began announcing major structural reforms of the bureaucracy. On that date, the Communist Review, (Note: Tạp chí Cộng Sản.) an official publication of the Communist Party of Vietnam, published an article titled Tinh – Gọn – Mạnh – Hiệu năng – Hiệu lực – Hiệu quả (roughly translated as Sharp, compact, strong; High-performance, effective, efficient) credited to General Secretary Tô Lâm, in which he proclaimed the general strategic direction of the upcoming reforms.

Billed as "a revolution in streamlining the apparatus of the political system" (Vietnamese: Cách mạng về tinh gọn tổ chức bộ máy của hệ thống chính trị), the reform aims to remove overlapping areas of responsibility between different agencies and levels of government, distinguishing between levels of government responsible for the formulation and implementation of policy, and reassessing public sector employees in number and quality based on measurables. Particularly pertinent to the organisation of local government is the slogan "Locals decide, locals do, locals take responsibility" (Vietnamese: Địa phương quyết, địa phương làm, địa phương chịu trách nhiệm).

In December 2024, plans were announced to merge several ministries and ministry-level agencies, with provinces following suit in merging their corresponding provincial-level departments. These reforms were enacted into law by the National Assembly in February 2025 and came into force in March of the same year.

As late as mid-February, the Minister of Home Affairs denied plans for provincial mergers, with the National Assembly continuing to debate changes to the Law on the organisation of local government (Note: Luật tổ-chức chính-quyền địa-phương.) without any consideration of eliminating the district level. Discussion revolved mainly around the elimination or retention of commune-level people's councils. The rural-district level was only due to be abolished for the police forces. On 19 February, state media began announcing that the Politburo had requested the consideration of eliminating the rural-district level of government and merging "some" provinces.

== Restructuring and merger of local government units ==
=== Phase 1 ===
Map of Vietnam by province as of 12 June 2025, which includes the representative rendering of the disputed Paracel and Spratly Islands.

According to the Ministry of Home Affairs has proposed merging districts that do not meet the criteria for area and demography. On February 18, 2025, the Ministry of Home Affairs issued Decision 73/QĐ–BNV regarding the Program of practicing thrift and combating wastefulness by the Ministry of Home Affairs for 2025. However, just before the start of the 2025 New Year holidays, the top state bodies announced the first program of reforms. The campaign began with the merger or dissolution of a series of state agencies, which were considered inefficient and wasteful of budget funds.

This has led to the dismissal of thousands of government employees who failed to meet work performance standards. In addition, the arrangement and merger at the provincial-level also takes into account geographical conditions, socio-economic level, and infrastructure.

On February 21, the Government of Vietnam issued Declaration on Vietnam's baselines in the Gulf of Tonkin and immediately submitted to the United Nations a depository copy of the nautical chart and coordinates of the baselines in the Gulf of Tonkin. (Note: Lưu chiểu hải đồ và đường cơ sở của Việt Nam tại vịnh Bắc Bộ.) The event, although causing outrage in the People's Republic of China, is seen as a stepping stone for efforts to reform Vietnam's already troubled administrative unit system.

=== Phase 2 ===
After the 2025 Lunar New Year, on February 22, with Concludes 126 and 127, (Note: Kết Luận 126 và 127.) the Politburo and the Central Secretariat announced a number of proposals on merging administrative units.

Among them, the plan for a government with only three levels (Note: Mô hình chính quyền ba cấp.) received high consensus. Six days later, the Politburo and the Secretariat officially announced the policy of eliminating rural districts (huyện), then merging communes (xã) and finally merging provinces (tỉnh).

In response to this directive, localities were required to suspend all elections and not build new government buildings to save their budgets. Under this criterion, the number of communes and provinces in Vietnam will begin to be reduced by 1/5 (commune) to 1/2 (province), with completion by May 2025 at the latest.

Old	New
Province / Centrally-run City (Municipality)	Province / (Centrally-run) City
Rural district / District-level town / Urban district / Provincial city / Municipal city	Level abolished
Commune / Commune-level town / Ward	Commune / Ward / Special Zone
Village / Resident group	Level abolished
Hamlet / Neighbourhood	Hamlet / Neighborhood

From March 7 to 17, 2025, the Government and the Fatherland Front gradually announced plans to cut personnel and eliminate ineffective agencies in localities, (Note: Kết luận số 128-KL/TW (ngày 7/3/2025) của Bộ Chính Trị về chủ trương công tác cán bộ. Ủy viên Bộ Chính Trị, Thường trực Ban Bí Thư Trần Cẩm Tú.) stressing the implementation must ensure caution, thoroughness and quality. It also stated its focus on receiving opinions from the Politburo at the meeting on March 7, 2025, completing the submission and project for arrangement and reorganization of administrative units at all levels, and building a model for organizing local governments to ensure adequate political, legal basis and praxis in implementing. However, this move was criticized by many domestic and international media outlets for a lack of transparency.

On March 14, 2025, the Politburo and the National Assembly began a meeting, which is said to be the longest in its history, lasting until May. This event was to prepare for the official list of administrative units after the rearrangement and merger.

Prime Minister Phạm Minh Chính announced on March 11, 2025 an August 30 deadline for the reforms, to allow the new administrative units to take effect by September 1.

Based on Resolution 1211 enacted by the Standing Committee of the National Assembly of Vietnam in 2016, the Ministry of Home Affairs officially announced the list of province-level administrative units subject to merging because they did not meet population, economic and infrastructural standards on March 26, 2025. In addition, the government also encouraged provinces to name new communes in order number.

- 11 localities will be preserved: Hà Nội, Huế, Lai Châu, Điện Biên, Sơn La, Cao Bằng, Lạng Sơn, Quảng Ninh, Thanh Hóa, Nghệ An, Hà Tĩnh.
- 52 localities will be arranged: Hải Phòng, Hồ Chí Minh, Đà Nẵng, Cần Thơ, Hà Nam, Hưng Yên, Vĩnh Phúc, Bắc Ninh, Thái Bình, Hải Dương, Nam Định, Ninh Bình, Bắc Kạn, Thái Nguyên, Phú Thọ, Bắc Giang, Hòa Bình, Tuyên Quang, Lào Cai, Yên Bái, Hà Giang, Ninh Thuận, Quảng Trị, Phú Yên, Quảng Bình, Quảng Ngãi, Khánh Hòa, Đắk Nông, Tây Ninh, Bình Dương, Bình Thuận, Bình Phước, Bà Rịa – Vũng Tàu, Bến Tre, Bạc Liêu, Vĩnh Long, Hậu Giang, Trà Vinh, Tiền Giang, Sóc Trăng, Đồng Tháp, An Giang, Long An, Cà Mau, Quảng Nam, Bình Định, Đắk Lắk, Đồng Nai, Gia Lai, Kon Tum, Lâm Đồng, Kiên Giang.

Therefore, 34 new localities are expected: Hà Nội, Huế, Lai Châu, Điện Biên, Sơn La, Lạng Sơn, Quảng Ninh, Thanh Hóa, Nghệ An, Hà Tĩnh, Cao Bằng, Tuyên Quang, Lào Cai, Thái Nguyên, Phú Thọ, Bắc Ninh, Hưng Yên, Hải Phòng, Ninh Bình, Quảng Trị, Đà Nẵng, Quảng Ngãi, Gia Lai, Khánh Hòa, Lâm Đồng, Đắk Lắk, Hồ Chí Minh, Đồng Nai, Tây Ninh, Cần Thơ, Vĩnh Long, Đồng Tháp, Cà Mau, An Giang. In addition, 13 island districts (Note: Vietnamese: Huyện đảo) will be transformed into special zones under their respective provinces: (Note: Vietnamese: Đặc khu thuộc tỉnh) Bạch Long Vĩ, Cát Hải, Cồn Cỏ, Côn Đảo, Cô Tô, Hoàng Sa, Lý Sơn, Kiên Hải, Phú Quốc, Phú Quý, Thổ Châu, Trường Sa, Vân Đồn.

According to Resolution 60–NQ/TW on April 12, 2025 of the 11th Conference of the XIII Central Committee of the Communist Party of Vietnam, the country will be divided into 6 key economic regions: Northern Midlands and Mountains, Red River Delta, North-Central and Central Coastal, Western Highlands, Southeast, Mekong River Delta.

=== Phase 3 ===
On April 14, 2025, Lê Minh Hưng – Member of the Politburo, Secretary of the Party Central Committee, Head of the Central Organizing Committee and Deputy Head of the Standing Committee of the Central Steering Committee (Steering Committee) – on the review of Resolution 18–NQ/TW (October 25, 2017 of the Communist Party Central Committee (XII term) some issues on continuing to renovate and organize the streamlined political system. 47–KH/BCD (Plan 47) of the Steering Committee on the arrangement and merger of the provincial and commune-level administrative units and organize the 2-level local government system.

The project clearly stated the implementation of Resolution 60–NQ/TW, dated 12 April, 2025, of the XIII Communist Party Central Committee on continuing to re-organize the organizational structure of the political system. In order for the implementation to ensure the proposed schedule, achieve the streamlined, performance, effective and effective goals associated with the successful organization of the Party Congress at all levels to the XIV National Party Congress, the Central Steering Committee on the review of Resolution 18 promulgates the Plan to arrange and merge the administrative unit at the provincial and commune authorities.

Plan 47 clearly stated the requirements, the Party committees, party organizations, agencies, units and heads:

1. Sticking to the resolutions and conclusions of the Central Executive Committee, the Politburo, the Secretariat. Proactively and actively do well the work of thorough grasping, propagating, mobilizing, ideological and social public orientation, ensuring solidarity, consensus and high unity among officials, party members, civil servants, officials, workers and people of all classes.
2. Focusing on directing and urgently concretizing plans according to functions, tasks and competence; drastically implement the tasks and assign specific responsibilities in the implementation organization to ensure the completion of the plan. At the same time, ensure agencies, units and organizations before, during and after arranging continuous, smooth, effective, effective and effective operation, not to interrupt work, abandoning tasks, areas, areas and affecting normal activities of agencies, units, organizations and society.
3. Strong application of information technology, digital conversion to reform activities of agencies and units. Urgently digitize documents, comprehensive renovation of administrative procedures, improve the quality of online public services, digital services for people and businesses.
4. Strictly control the situation, ensure security and order in areas, absolutely do not let the situation of many people's complaints or arise hot and complicated spots.
5. Closely, timely, synchronous, effective and proactive coordination, strengthening inspection, inspection and supervision of the implementation of the tasks assigned in this plan. Praise and reward organizations and individuals effectively and strictly handle and promptly handle organizations and individuals that do not comply with or comply with regulations, fail to reach the goal of arranging and merging provincial and commune-level administrative units and organizing a 2-level local government system.
6. From April 16 to October 31, 2025, periodically reporting on the progress of performing tasks and projects on the Steering Committee (via the Central Organizing Committee) before 15:00 every Wednesday, for the Central Organizing Committee to synthesize, report to the Politburo and Secretariat every Friday.

Also according to Plan 47, the Central Organizing Committee shall assume the prime responsibility and coordinate with the concerned committees, agencies and units to help the Steering Committee:

1. Regularly monitor, firmly grasp the situation, participate in opinions (when necessary) in the process of implementing the steps to perform the tasks of the committees, agencies and units to ensure the schedule and policies of the Central Executive Committee, the Ministry of Politics, the Secretariat and the Steering Committee.
2. Timely adjust and supplement the contents, tasks and progress of implementation in the plan to ensure the leadership and direction of the Politburo, the Secretariat and in accordance with the practical situation.

== Other reforms ==
Other parts and aspects of the governing apparatus were also reformed in 2025.

=== Central party and government apparatus ===
In early December, Head of the Organisation Commission Lê Minh Hưng announced proposals for restructuring government ministries and other agencies subject to the government, with the goal of reducing at least five ministries and two agencies directly subordinate to the government. On 8 December, Minister of Home Affairs Phạm Thị Thanh Trà proposed new names for the combined ministries. On 13 January, the government finalised its proposals, with the restructuring proposals from early December largely retained but with different names for the new ministries, mostly retaining one of the existing ministry names. The Ministry of Home Affairs also requested that other ministries submit their proposals for internal restructuring (formally ‘mergers and streamlining’) by 15 January.

The party organisation and the National Assembly were also restructured, with many commissions and committees merged or ended. These proposals were approved by the Central Committee on 23 and 24 January alongside the restructuring of the government.

On 18 February, at the 9th Extraordinary Session, the National Assembly approved resolutions on reorganising its own committee system in accordance with the proposals approved by the Central Committee, reducing the number of committees by 2.

On the same day, the National Assembly also approved resolutions on the composition of the government for the 2021–26 term, under which the government was to be reduced to 14 ministries and 3 ministry-level agencies. The new names and division of functions reflect the proposal the government confirmed in mid-January.

- The Ministry of Finance merged with the Ministry of Planning and Instruction, as well as the Commission for the Management of State Capital at Enterprises (CMSC), to form the new Ministry of Finance.
- The Ministry of Construction merged with the Ministry of Transportation (except for functions relating to the issuance of driver’s licences, which were transferred to the Ministry of Public Security) to form the new Ministry of Construction.
- The Ministry of Science and Technology merged with the Ministry of Information and Communications (except for functions relating to journalism and publishing, transferred to the Ministry of Culture, Sports and Tourism) to form the new Ministry of Science and Technology.
- The Ministry of Home Affairs merged with the Ministry of Labour, Invalids and Social Affairs, including those functions relating to labour issues, workplace safety, social security, and gender equality from, to form the new Ministry of Home Affairs.
  - The Ministry of Education and Training received those functions relating to vocational education from the Ministry of Labour, Invalids and Social Affairs.
- The Ministry of Agriculture and Rural Development merged with the Ministry of Natural Resources and the Environment to form the new Ministry of Agriculture and the Environment, which also received functions relating to poverty reduction from the Ministry of Labour, Invalids and Social Affairs.
- The Committee on Ethnic Minority Affairs received those functions relating to religious affairs from the Ministry of Home Affairs and was renamed the Ministry of Ethnic and Religious Affairs.

Eight existing ministries were retained largely unchanged (National Defence; Public Security; Justice; Industry and Trade; Culture, Sports and Tourism; Foreign Affairs; Education and Training; and Health), alongside three ministry-level agencies (the Government Office, the Government Inspectorate, and the State Bank). This new government composition became operative on 1 March.

==== Changes to party leadership regulations ====
In September the Politburo issued a new directory of positions of leadership in the political system, grouped into four groups: key and high-level leadership of the Party and State (group I), titles and positions managed by the Politburo (group II), titles and positions managed by the Secretariat (group III), and titles and positions managed by party branches. Compared to the previous directory, the position of Permanent Member of the Secretariat has been added to the list of key positions, and the positions of Chair of the Central Inspection Commission, other heads of central party commissions, and President of Hồ Chí Minh National Academy of Politics have been added to the list of high-level leadership positions. There are other changes in sub-group classifications in the other groups.

=== Local government apparatus ===
Sporadic attempts to streamline provincial governments began in December 2024. On 13 January, the government gave guidance to provinces on restructuring their provincial departments along the lines of proposals for central government ministries released on the same day, with mirroring names and responsibilities.

On 28 February, the government published a decree limiting all provinces and cities to 14 provincial departments, except for Hanoi and Ho Chi Minh City, which were allowed 15. Twelve of these were to be established in every province, while four other possible departments could only be established under specific conditions. For example, a Foreign Affairs department can only be established by provinces with an international border crossing, airport, or seaport, or a sufficient number of foreigners resident, or sufficient foreign domestic investment or foreign trade.

This decree also established analogous limits at the district level, which was abolished during the local government reorganisation. It was replaced on 12 June by a decree establishing limits at the provincial and communal level instead. The provincial limits were unchanged, while communes and wards are restricted to three technical divisions: the People’s Council and People’s Council office, the Economics division (or the Economics, Infrastructure and Urban Development division in urban areas), and the Culture and Social Affairs division.

== Aftermath ==
=== Operation of the new local government system ===
Key positions in the provincial leadership, including the People’s Committee chairs, the provincial party secretaries, and numerous provincial party officials, were publicly announced at ceremonies held simultaneously on 30 June in every province. These ceremonies were held to celebrate the transition to the new local government structure, which came in force the next day. Party and state leaders from the centre were present at most of these ceremonies, including General Secretary Tô Lâm in Hồ Chí Minh City, State President Lương Cường in Hanoi, Prime Minister Phạm Minh Chính in Haiphong, National Assembly Chair Trần Thanh Mẫn in Thái Nguyên, and Organisation Commission Head Lê Minh Hưng in Ninh Bình.

The reforms also affected various organisations not directly tied to local government, including central government agencies such as the General Department of Customs, the State Bank, and the Military, and front organisations such as the Women's Union and the General Confederation of Labour, all of which had to re-align their operational geographies to the new local administrative boundaries.

Local governments faced various obstacles in implementing the new structure. In remote and mountainous areas, the limited number of buildings and facilities of the previous communes often prevented all employees of a commune from working in the same location. Large geographic size, challenging terrain, and limited connectivity severely obstruct the function of local government. In October 2025, deputies of the National Assembly and the provincial government of Lâm Đồng both highlighted the issues of building and staff shortages at the communal level, noting that communes received 1065 new tasks from the abolished district level alone.

Technical staff shortages were not limited to remote provinces. Major urban areas in cities and provinces such as Ho Chi Minh City and Đồng Nai, which include many urban wards of large population, reported difficulty handling the volume of paperwork generated by hundreds of thousands of residents while being subjected to similar employee quotas as smaller urban wards in other provinces.

On 31 December, the government revised the decree on limits on the size of local government to allow higher quotas for deputy heads of provincial/city departments and communal/ward divisions.

In Đà Nẵng, the former city of Hội An was divided into three wards and one island commune, which split up the responsibility for various heritage and tourist sites and complicating efforts to manage develop tourism. In April 2026, the province proposed a Coordinating Committee for wards and communes that comprise the former city of Hội An, and similar committees for the former city of Tam Kỳ and the inner part of the pre-merger city of Đà Nẵng.

=== Reapportionment of the National Assembly ===
In December 2025, the National Election Council reapportioned the 500 seats in the National Assembly to the new 34 provinces and cities. The minimum size of a provincial delegation increased from 6 to 7. Ho Chi Minh City and Hanoi continued to send the largest two delegations, although the 38-strong delegation for Ho Chi Minh City is 9 seats smaller than the combined size of the three predecessor delegations.

=== Revision of provincial level general plans ===
All provinces and cities, including those who did not undergo provincial-level mergers, were required to revise their general plans to suit the new administrative structure and boundaries. The original deadline set in August 2025 was 31 December 2025. A directive from the Ministry of Finance in October 2025 reiterated the same deadline.

However, in practice, few provinces actually submitted their revised general plans in time, and as of early May 2026, at least 10 provinces, mostly in Central Vietnam, had not submitted their plans. These provinces received a letter from the Prime Minister on 1 May demanding they fulfil this obligation by the end of May. On 25 May, this deadline was extended to 1 July.

=== Revision of local administrative units standards and classification ===
A new resolution promulgated by the Standing Committee of the National Assembly in December 2025 established new standards for local administrative units, but did not apply them retroactively to units established during the 2025 mergers. The standards vary by region and certain socioeconomic conditions. Among other exemptions, a blanket exemption applies when an administrative unit is established, merged, or divided to meet ‘special demands in territorial management, defence of national sovereignty, or socioeconomic development’. This resolution was passed on the same day as the resolution on urban classification, and a number of its provisions are linked to that resolution, although the two processes are separate. For example, a city must be recognised as a class I urban area, and a province must contain at least one class II urban area. This resolution also officially adopted the simple term ‘thành phố’ (city) for the centrally-administered cities, as the other type of cities no longer exists.

In November 2025, the government also promulgated a new decree on classification of local government units into four classes, Special, I, II, and III, adapting the criteria after the abolition of the district level and the greater post-merger size of administrative units. Hanoi and Ho Chi Minh City continued to be automatically classified as special class, and all other cities were automatically classified as class I. At the commune level, the resolution created the new possibility for urban wards to be classified as special.

All cities and provinces were required to classify themselves and their own wards and communes according to the new criteria by 30 June 2026; units that did not undergo mergers must be classified by 30 April.

=== Urban classification ===
==== Revision of urban classification rules ====
Prior to the reforms, urban areas in Vietnam were classified into six classes: special, and I through V (Roman numerals). At the provincial level, centrally-administered cities were either of Special class (Hanoi and Ho Chi Minh City) or of class I; at the district level, provincially-administered cities were either of class I, II, or III, towns were either of class IV or V; and at the commune level, townships (Vietnamese: thị trấn) were either of class IV or V. Urban classification could also be conferred on areas that are designated as future cities, towns, or townships; these could be a rural district, a cluster of rural communes, or a single rural commune. Urban areas either coincide with one administrative unit or are intended to become one administrative unit, and those at the provincial or district level contain rural outskirt areas (Vietnamese: ngoại thị) surrounding the central urban zone (Vietnamese: nội thị).

In August 2025, the Ministry of Construction circulated a new draft on urban classification. The Urban Development Agency noted that the new administrative structure presented challenges. The abolition of district-level cities and towns and commune-level townships meant that most urban areas no longer correspond to a single local government, and the existing criteria were unsuited for cases where the relevant local government is either smaller (several wards within a single larger urban area) or larger (a commune that is only partly urban) than the urban area. These initial proposals retained six classes, with the special class reserved for Hanoi and Ho Chi Minh City, class I reserved for other (centrally-administered) cities, classes II through IV for urban areas within provinces and cities, and class V for urban areas within a commune. They also included new criteria for assessing and classifying wards and prospective wards.

In September, the Ministry of Construction submitted revised proposals which reduced the number of classes of urban areas to four: special, I, II, and III. The definition of the first two classes were unchanged. Class II and III were defined as comprising one ward, a cluster of wards, or a cluster of wards and communes; class II are those urban zones with a ‘central role, location and function’. Special zones, which are island administrative areas, can also be classified as urban. The power to recognise class II and III urban areas was devolved to the cities and provinces.

The text of the new draft did not provide for recognition of urban areas smaller than a commune, and the transitional provisions suggested that such communes must be either converted to wards by 31 December 2025 (if eligible) or treated as rural. Because of this draft, some media outlets recalculated the urbanisation rate for provinces excluding all former townships merged into rural communes. For example, Phú Thọ Newspaper reported that the urbanisation rate of Phú Thọ declined from 33% to 17.7% under the new rules.

The resolution was promulgated in December, with no references to the administrative composition of urban areas, allowing urban areas to be smaller than one commune. Class II areas serve as 'general or specialty centres of a province, city, or a multi-provincial region, and class III areas for sub-provincial regions.

For all three classes, the criteria were grouped into three categories: role, location, and socioeconomic development conditions (e.g. balanced budget, foreign investment, GDP growth); urbanisation level (e.g. total urban population, density, non-agricultural share of employment); and level of infrastructure development and urban spatial organisation (e.g. transport hubs, waste treatment, public spaces). The power to recognise class II and III urban areas was devolved to the cities and provinces. The transitional provisions provide for former class I, II, and III urban areas, as well as the central urban area of cities (which were not previously separately classified), to be recognised as the new class II, and former class IV and V urban areas and all unclassified former towns and townships were to be recognised as the new class III.

==== Establishment of new cities and urban wards ====
Prior to the reforms, eight provinces were designated to become cities (‘cities subject to central administration’), mostly by 2030. Of these eight, Thừa Thiên-Huế became the (provincial-level) city of Huế in 2025 and was not subject to merger. Three other provinces were merged into neighbouring cities: Hải Dương into Hải Phòng, and Bình Dương and Bà Rịa–Vũng Tàu into Hồ Chí Minh City. The four remaining provinces – Bắc Ninh, Khánh Hoà, Ninh Bình, and Quảng Ninh – each retained their names after the merger or were not merged, and retained their designation as future cities.

In mid-March 2026, despite the lack of prior designation, Đồng Nai began work on its proposal to become a city by 2030. On 20 March, the Politburo ordered that Đồng Nai be established as a city immediately in 2026. Subsequently, this was confirmed by the Central Committee on 25 March, approved by the government on 6 April, and passed by the National Assembly on 24 April. Đồng Nai officially became a city on 30 April.

The Politburo approved of Quảng Ninh's bid for city status in April 2026, and Bắc Ninh's bid in June. The Central Committee approved of both provinces' bids in July 2026, and the proposals are currently up for consideration in a special session of the National Assembly in August 2026.

The government also invited the province of Ninh Bình to build a roadmap towards city status by 2030.

Other provinces have also made gestures towards city status. The provincial leadership of Tây Ninh and Thái Nguyên have both proposed working towards city status, while Hưng Yên has been asked by the government to look towards city status by 2030.

On 6 April, the government sent a letter to every city and province on establishing new urban administrative units (i.e. cities and wards). The three class I cities that underwent mergers in 2025 were asked to review their compliance with the new criteria on cities and class I urban areas and ensure that they become fully compliant by the end of 2027. Those provinces designated to become cities were asked to build a roadmap to fulfill the relevant criteria by 2030 and submit a proposal to the government as soon as possible. All cities and provinces were asked to review their rural communes, particularly those containing former townships, and convert them to urban wards where the standards are met.

As of July 2026, the provinces of Thái Nguyên, Bắc Ninh, Hưng Yên, Khánh Hoà, Lâm Đồng, Tây Ninh, Đồng Tháp, Vĩnh Long, Cà Mau, and the cities of Hải Phòng, Đà Nẵng, and Ho Chi Minh City are known to have plans to convert rural communes to urban wards.

In most cases, steps have only been taken at the provincial level, and approval by the Standing Committee of the National Assembly will be required for these conversions to take effect. The proposed conversions in Bắc Ninh was approved by the Standing Committee on 4 August.

== Influence ==
This general institutional reform is considered to be only aimed at eliminating district-level military agencies (Note: Bộ chỉ huy quân sự cấp huyện.), which is often thought to be the main potential of the military faction (or Nghệ–Tĩnh sect) in the government. It is also part of the program to acquire power for the Hưng Yên sect before the XIV National Congress of the Vietnam Communist Party in January 2026, the event will surely determine Vietnam's most important positions in the next 10 years.

- National Assembly Chairman Trần Thanh Mẫn:
  "The issuance of Resolution 1104 [of Nam Định province] aims to concentrate local resources, optimise potential and advantages, expand the development space, enhance regional connectivity, attract investment, create new development momentum, boost growth and economic restructuring, and better the quality of people’s material and spiritual life. The re-arrangement will improve the balance and harmony in population distribution, create a lean apparatus of the political system, and promote civil servants and public employees’ performance and sense of responsibility to better serve people and enterprises, especially when the decentralisation of power to local administrations is being fostered. A strong commune will contribute to a strong district, and a strong district will contribute to a strong province which will subsequently contribute to a strong country".
- Home Affairs Minister Phạm Thị Thanh Trà:
  "It is expected that we will complete the entire arrangement of commune-level administrative units before June 30 so that by July 1, commune-level administrative units will be operated under the new organization. We will also focus on completing the merger of provincial-level administrative units before August 30 so that we can immediately implement the operation of provincial-level administrative units starting from September 1".
- Department of Local Government Director Phan Trung Tuấn:
  "Through the reflection, the localities did not misunderstand, did not have any comments, however, public opinion is having some misunderstandings. I would like to emphasize that the tasks that are being suspended are the tasks that the localities are performing according to Resolution No. 1211 of the National Assembly Standing Committee before. There is no stopping the construction and implementation of the project to merge provincial and commune-level administrative units, and abolish the district level according to Conclusion 127 dated February 28, 2025 of the Politburo. The work related to this policy is being carried out by the Ministry of Home Affairs and central and local agencies with a spirit of "lightning speed", working day and night "but also cautiously and thoroughly to ensure the completion of this task according to the roadmap set out in Official Dispatch No. 43-KH/BCĐ of the Central Steering Committee on summarizing Resolution No. 18-NQ/TW"".

== See also ==
- Provinces of Vietnam
- Districts of Vietnam
- Communes of Vietnam
- Wards of Vietnam
- Special zones of Vietnam
- Merger (politics)
