= Hoàng Mai, Nghệ An =

Hoàng Mai Phường Hoàng Mai
- Ward
- Interactive map of Hoàng Mai
- Coordinates: 19°15′14.68″N 105°42′37.55″E
- Country: Vietnam
- Province: Nghệ An province
- Established: June 16, 2025

Area
  - Total: 30.76 sq mi (79.67 km^{2})

Population (2024)
  - Total: 44,474
  - Density: 1,446/sq mi (558.2/km^{2})
- Time zone: UTC+07:00 (Indochina Time)
- Administrative code: 17110

Hoàng Mai (Vietnamese: Phường Hoàng Mai) is a ward of Nghệ An province, Vietnam. It is one of the 130 new wards, communes and special zones of the province following the reorganization in 2025.

== History ==
On June 16, 2025, the National Assembly Standing Committee issued Resolution No. 1678/NQ-UBTVQH15 on the arrangement of commune-level administrative units of Nghệ An province in 2025 (effective from June 16, 2025). Accordingly, the entire land area and population of Quỳnh Thiện ward, Quỳnh Trang and Quỳnh Vinh communes of the former Hoàng Mai town will be integrated into a new ward named Hoàng Mai (Clause 111, Article 1).
