= Ninh Hòa (town) =

Coordinates: 12°29′30″N 109°7′33″E

- District-level town (Class-4)
- Ninh Hòa Town; Thị xã Ninh Hòa
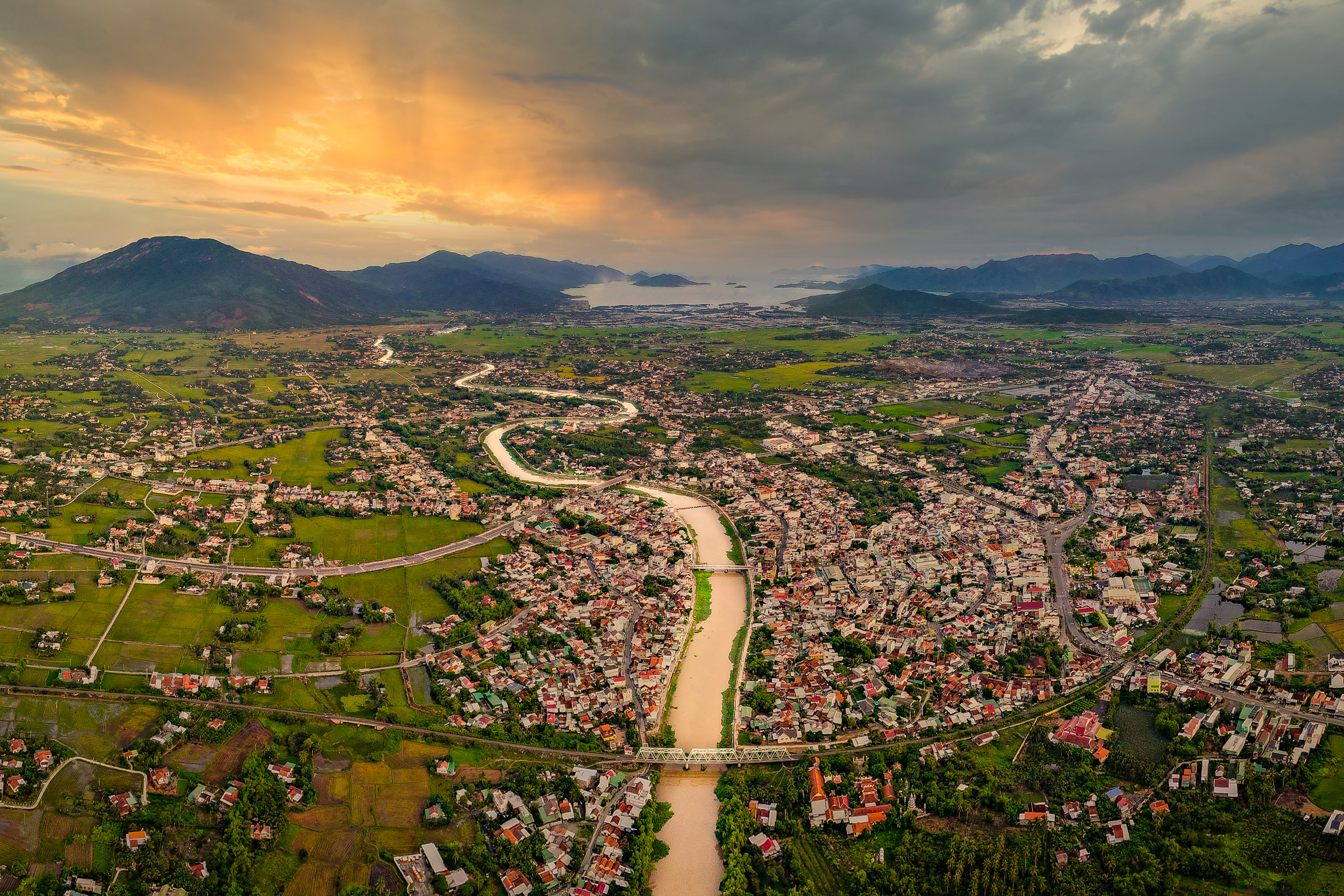
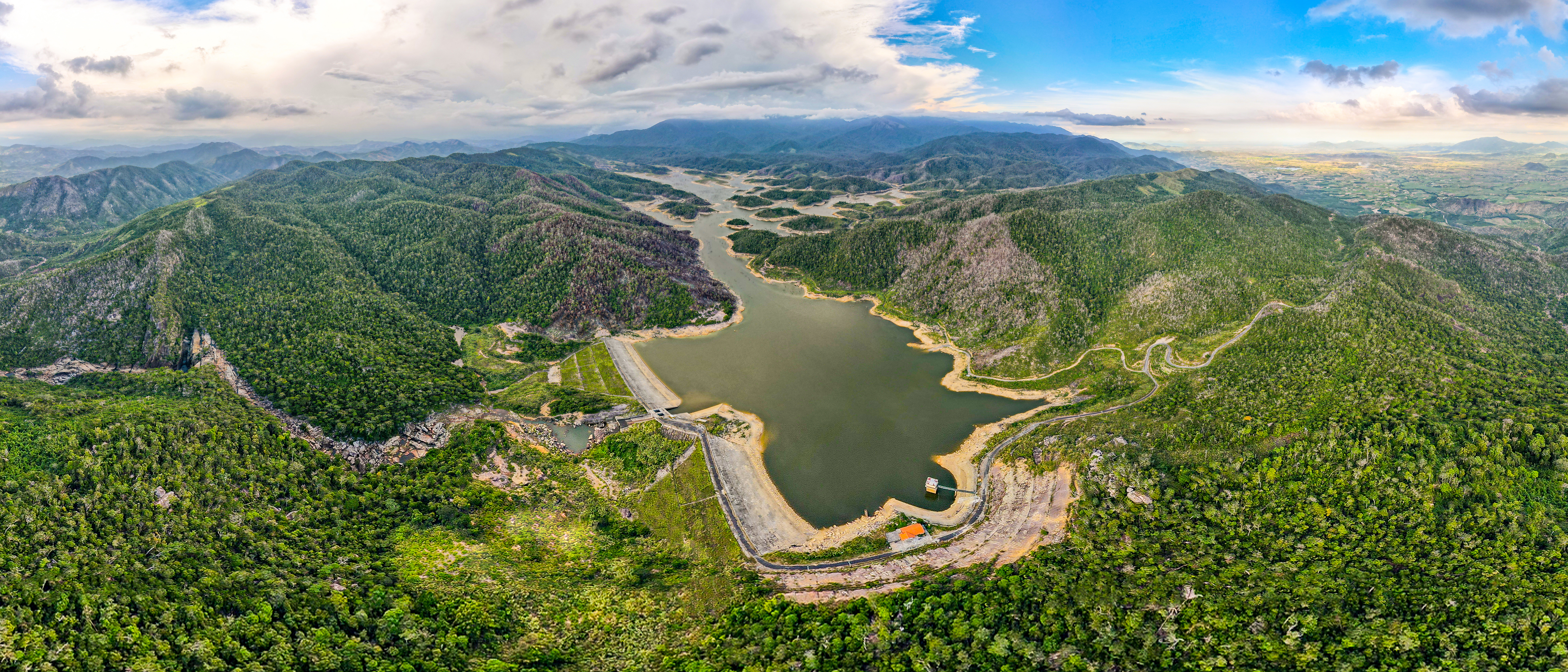
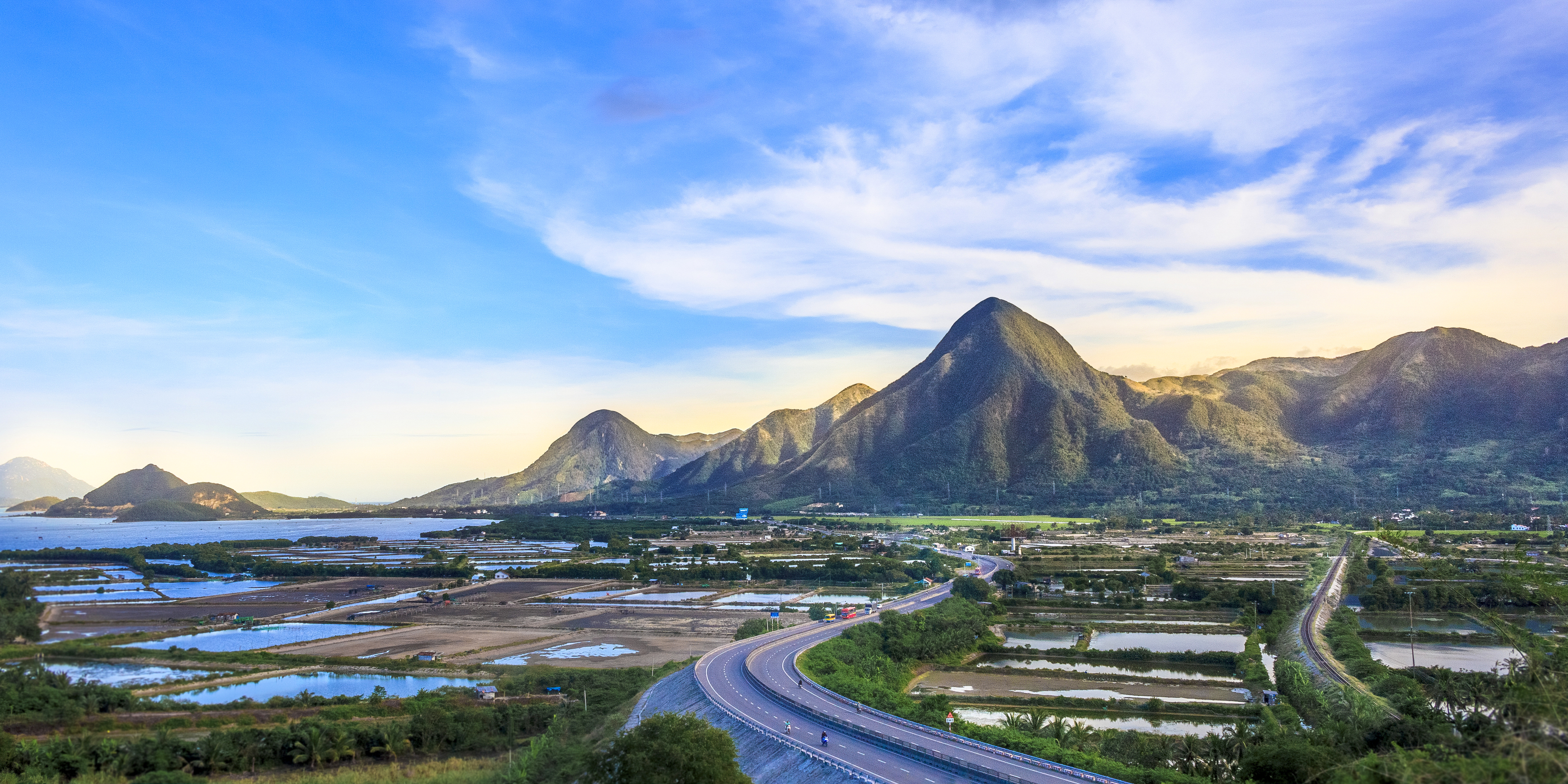
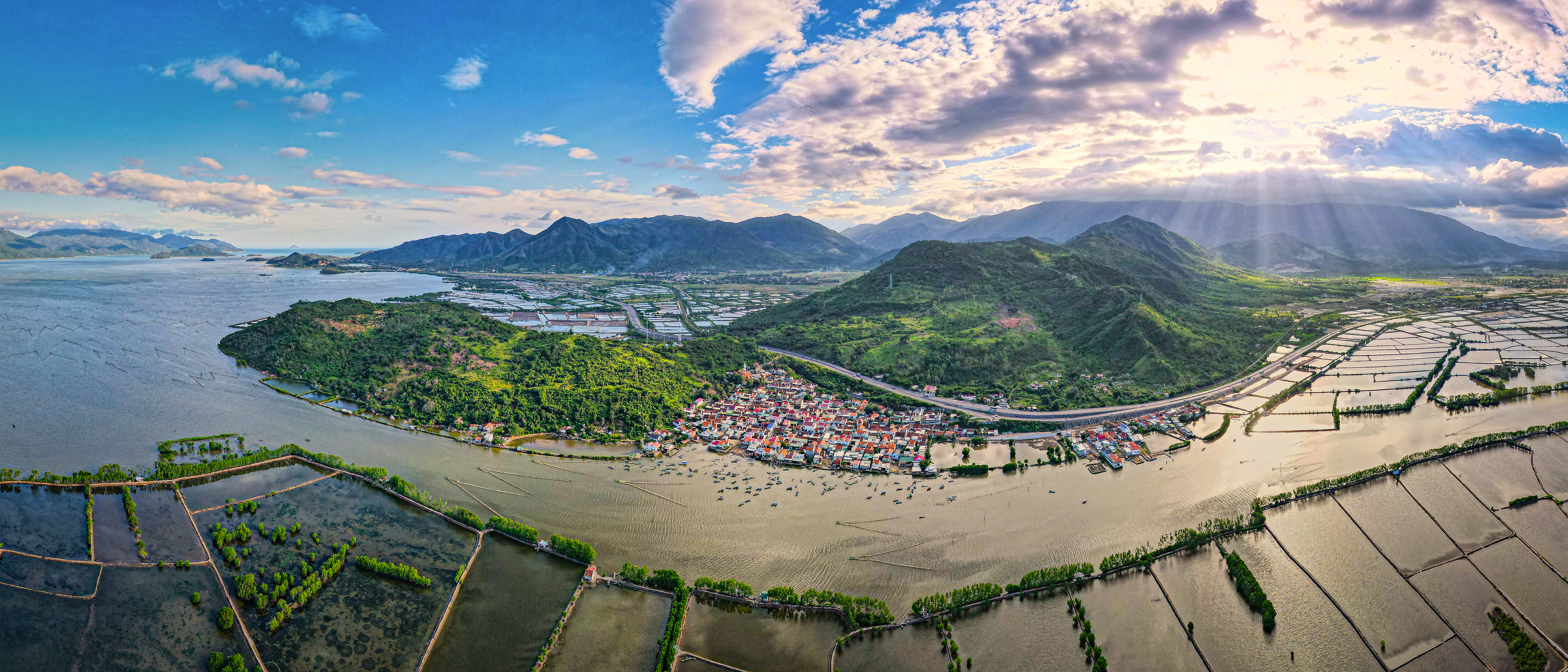
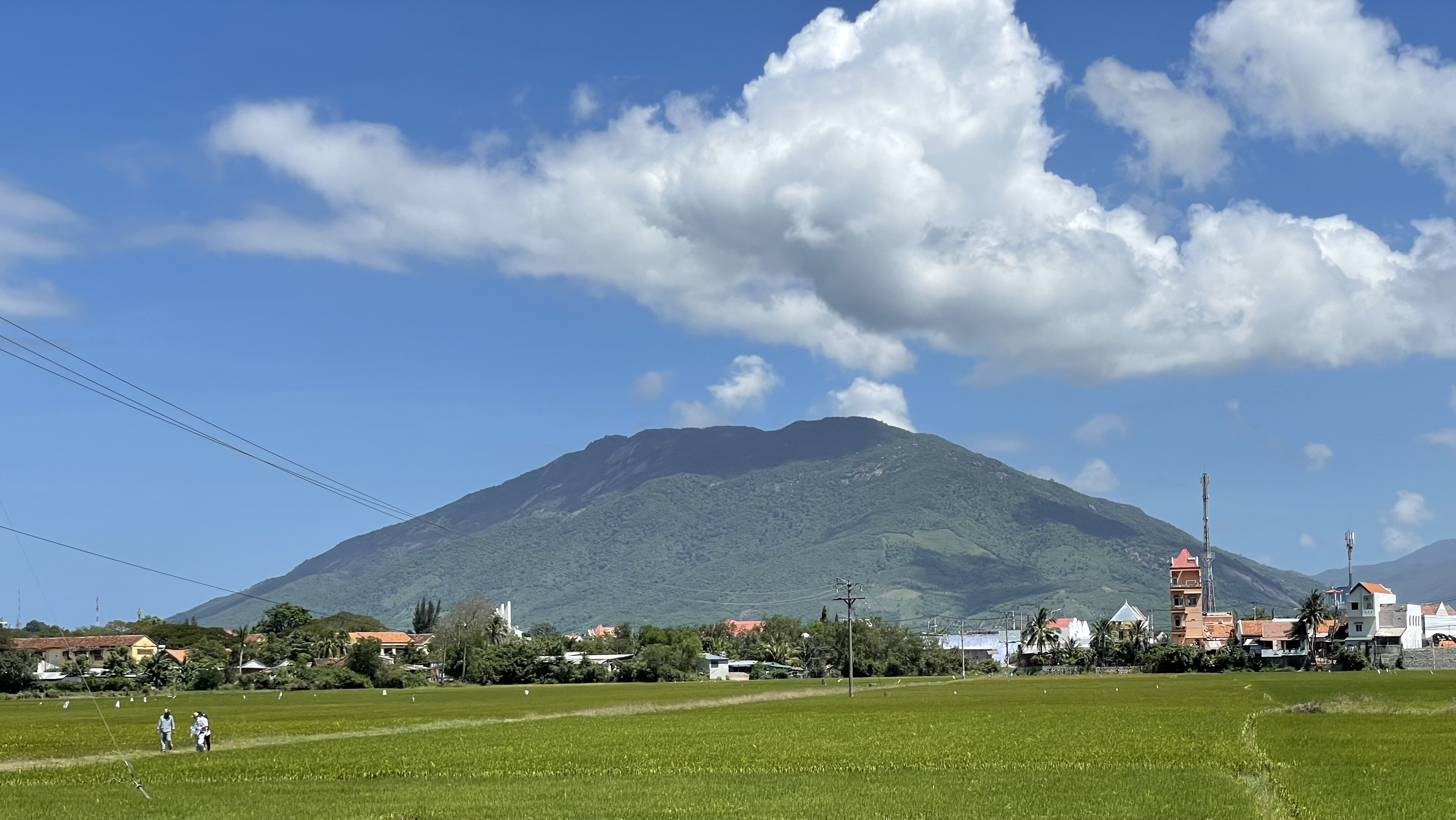
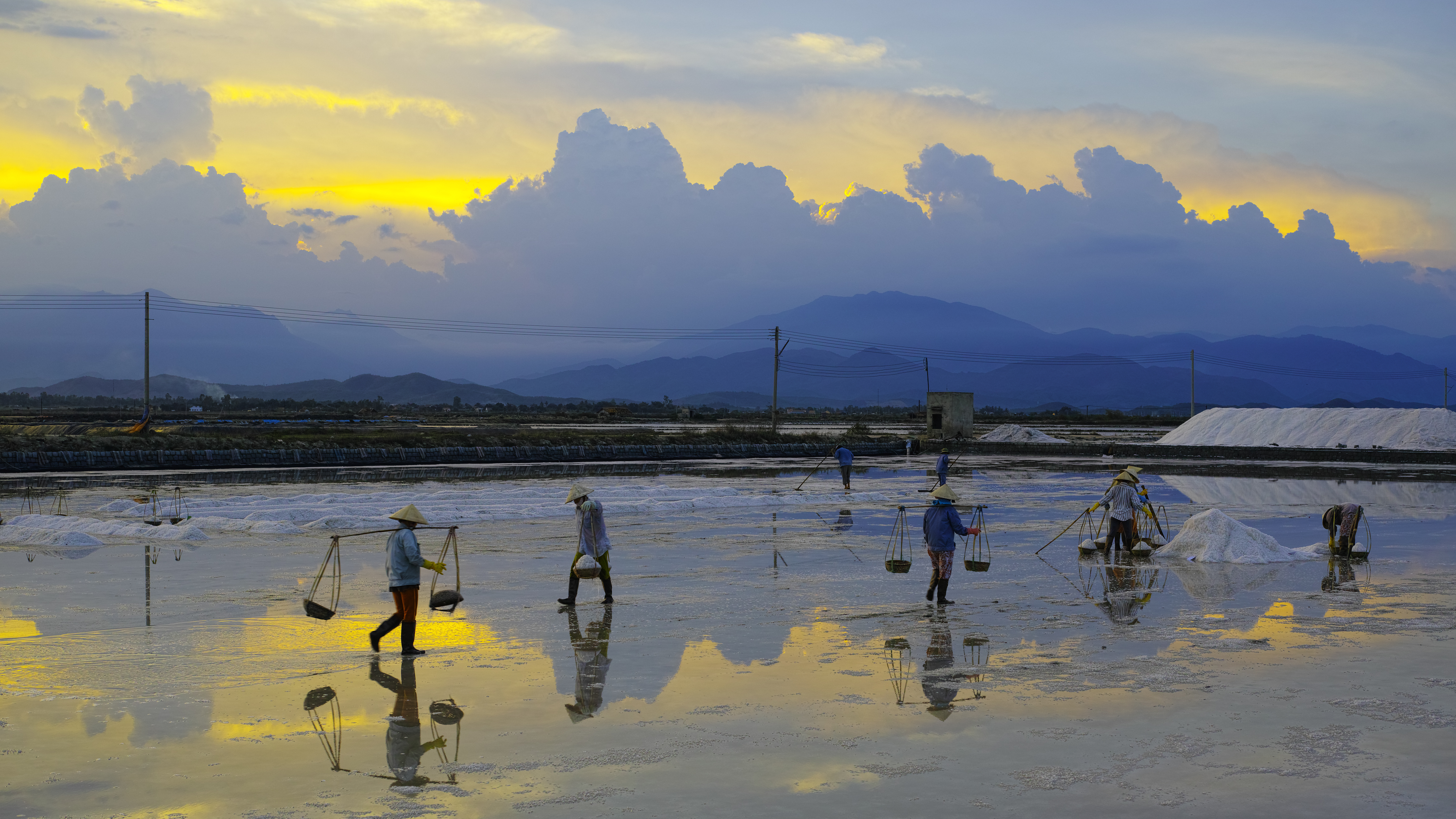
- From left to right, from top to bottom: Dawn on both banks of Dinh River (Ninh Hiep ward), Ea Krông Rou Hydroelectric Reservoir (Ninh Tây commune), Ro Tuong pass (bridge between Ninh Lộc and Ninh Ích commune), part of Ninh Phú commune and Ninh Lộc commune, Hon Heo (Ninh Đa commune), salt fields in Ninh Diêm ward.

- Seal
- /0/queryThe property query is required; /0/idsThe property ids is required; /0Failed to match at least one schema; /0/titleThe property title is required; /0/serviceDoes not have a value in the enumeration ["page"]; /0Failed to match exactly one schema; /0/geometriesThe property geometries is required; /0/typeDoes not have a value in the enumeration ["GeometryCollection"]; /0/typeDoes not have a value in the enumeration ["MultiPolygon"]; /0/typeDoes not have a value in the enumeration ["Point"]; /0/typeDoes not have a value in the enumeration ["MultiPoint"]; /0/typeDoes not have a value in the enumeration ["LineString"]; /0/typeDoes not have a value in the enumeration ["MultiLineString"]; /0/typeDoes not have a value in the enumeration ["Polygon"]; /0/coordinatesThe property coordinates is required; /0/geometryThe property geometry is required; /0/typeDoes not have a value in the enumeration ["Feature"]; /0/featuresThe property features is required; /0/typeDoes not have a value in the enumeration ["FeatureCollection"]
- Country: Vietnam
- Region: South Central Coast
- Province: Khánh Hòa
- Founded: 2010
- Capital: Ninh Hòa

Government
  - Chairman of the People's Committee: Nguyễn Vĩnh Thạnh
  - Chairman of the People's Council: Tống Trân
  - Chairman of the Fatherland Front: Cao Minh Thắng
  - Chief Justice of the People's Court: Võ Văn Hải
  - People's Procuracy Director: Bùi Văn Mỹ

Area
  - District-level town (Class-4): 463 sq mi (1,199 km^{2})

Population (2019)
  - District-level town (Class-4): 230.566
  - Density: 500/sq mi (193/km^{2})
  - Urban: 76,368
- Time zone: UTC+7 (Indochina Time)
- Website: ninhhoa.khanhhoa.gov.vn

Ninh Hòa is a former district-level town (thị xã) of Khánh Hòa province in the South Central Coast region of Vietnam. As of 2003 the town had a population of 227,630. The district covers an area of 1,199 km^{2} (463 sq mi). The district capital lies at Ninh Hòa.

== Administrative divisions ==
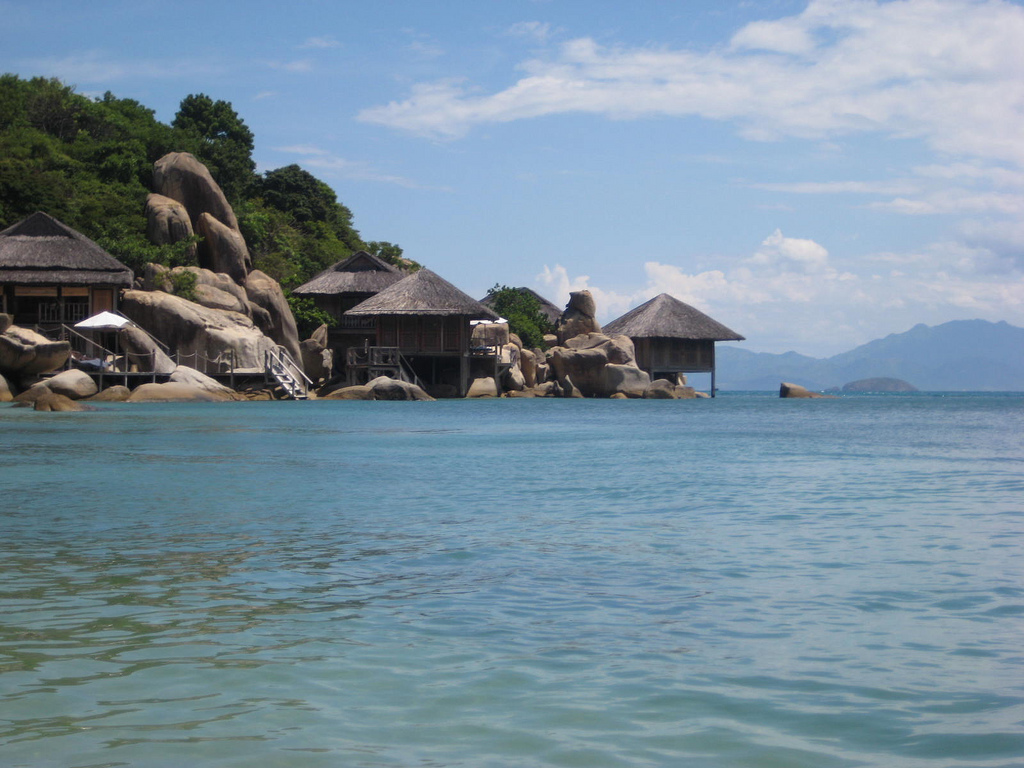
Tourist area at Ninh Vân bay in Ninh Phước commune.

Ninh Hòa is subdivided into

- 7 wards: Ninh Hiệp, Ninh Giang, Ninh Đa, Ninh Hà, Ninh Diêm, Ninh Thủy and Ninh Hải.
- 20 communes: Ninh Sơn, Ninh Thượng, Ninh Tây, Ninh Trung, Ninh An, Ninh Thọ, Ninh Sim, Ninh Xuân, Ninh Thân, Ninh Bình, Ninh Quang, Ninh Phú, Ninh Phước, Ninh Vân, Ninh Ích, Ninh Lộc, Ninh Hưng, Ninh Tân, Ninh Đông and Ninh Phụng.
