= Ngã Năm (town) =

Coordinates: 9°33′56″N 105°35′50″E

- District-level town (Class-4)
- Ngã Năm Town; Thị xã Ngã Năm
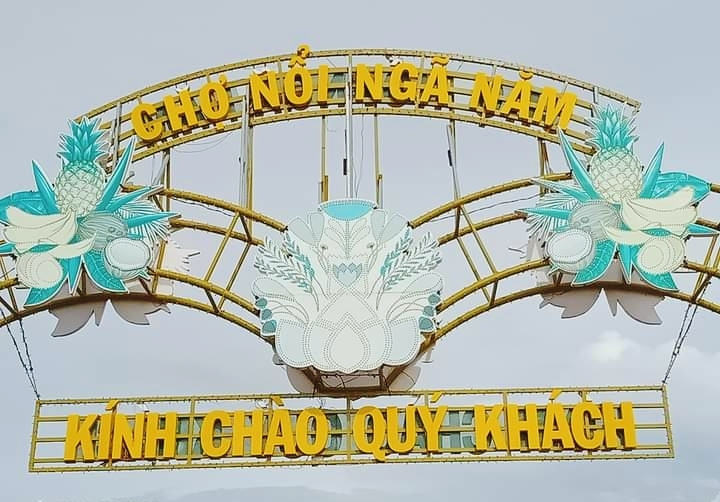
- Ngã Năm Floating Market
- /0/queryThe property query is required; /0/idsThe property ids is required; /0Failed to match at least one schema; /0/titleThe property title is required; /0/serviceDoes not have a value in the enumeration ["page"]; /0Failed to match exactly one schema; /0/geometriesThe property geometries is required; /0/typeDoes not have a value in the enumeration ["GeometryCollection"]; /0/typeDoes not have a value in the enumeration ["MultiPolygon"]; /0/typeDoes not have a value in the enumeration ["Point"]; /0/typeDoes not have a value in the enumeration ["MultiPoint"]; /0/typeDoes not have a value in the enumeration ["LineString"]; /0/typeDoes not have a value in the enumeration ["MultiLineString"]; /0/typeDoes not have a value in the enumeration ["Polygon"]; /0/coordinatesThe property coordinates is required; /0/geometryThe property geometry is required; /0/typeDoes not have a value in the enumeration ["Feature"]; /0/featuresThe property features is required; /0/typeDoes not have a value in the enumeration ["FeatureCollection"]
- Country: Vietnam
- Region: Mekong Delta
- Province: Sóc Trăng
- Established district: 31 October 2003
- Established district-level town: 29 December 2013

Area
  - District-level town (Class-4): 93.5307 sq mi (242.2435 km^{2})
  - Urban: 37.8501 sq mi (98.0313 km^{2})

Population (2013)
  - District-level town (Class-4): 84,022
  - Density: 898/sq mi (346.8/km^{2})
  - Urban: 43,714
  - Urban density: 1,155/sq mi (445.9/km^{2})
- Time zone: UTC+7 (UTC + 7)

Ngã Năm is a former district-level town (thị xã) of Sóc Trăng province in the Mekong River Delta region of Vietnam, was established on 29 December 2013. As of 2013 the district had a population of 84,022. The district-level town covers an area of 242.2435 km^{2} (93.5307 sq mi).

== Administrative divisions ==
3 phường (urban wards): 1 (formerly Ngã Năm town), 2 (formerly Long Tân commune), 3 (formerly Vĩnh Biên commune) and 5 xã (suburban communes): Long Bình, Mỹ Bình, Mỹ Quới, Tân Long, Vĩnh Quới.
