= Tịnh Biên (town) =

Coordinates: 10.583°N 105.000°E

- District-level town (Class-4)
- Tịnh Biên Town; Thị xã Tịnh Biên
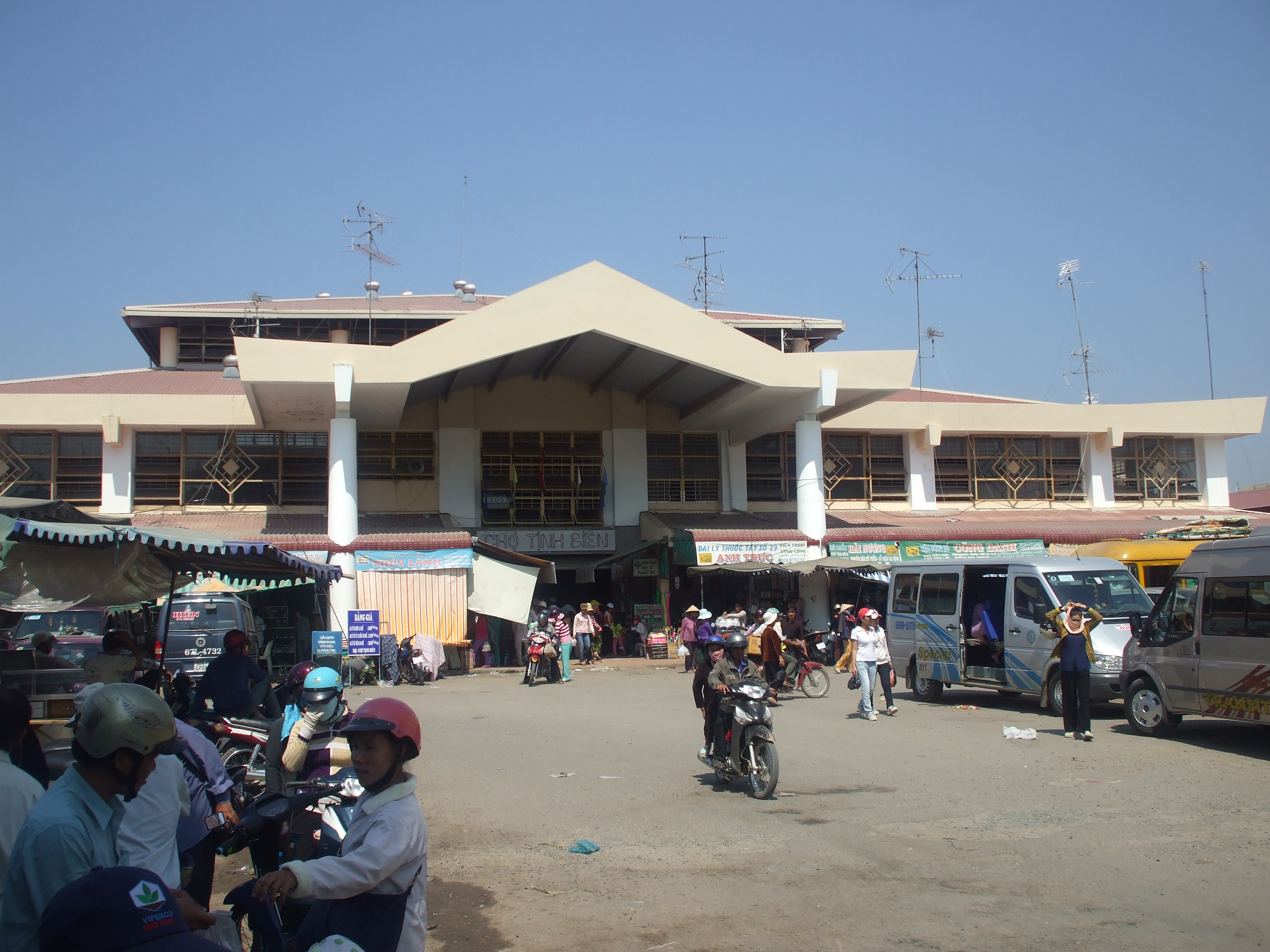

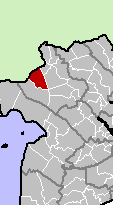
- Location in An Giang province
- Country: Vietnam
- Province: An Giang
- Seat: Tịnh Biên ward

Area
  - Total: 136.91 sq mi (354.59 km^{2})

Population (2022)
  - Total: 143,098
  - Density: 1,040/sq mi (403/km^{2})
- Time zone: UTC+07:00 (Indochina Time)

Tịnh Biên is a former district-level town (thị xã) of An Giang province in the Mekong Delta region of Vietnam.

As of 2022, the town had a population of 143,098. The town seat lies at Tịnh Biên ward.

The Tịnh Biên frontier market is located here.

Tịnh Biên is about 125 km from Phnom Penh along National Highway 2 (CPC). It is a common route used by tourists between Cambodia and Vietnam. The Khmer population is relatively high, especially in the communes of An Cư, Tân Lợi, An Hảo, Giao Va and Vĩnh Trung. Tịnh Biên district is connected by Highway 91 to Cần Thơ which also connects to Highway 1. and Highway 55 to Hà Tiên, about 80 km.

A village in the district was depicted in Robin Moore's fiction book The Green Berets; chapter 1 described a real-life battle at Tịnh Biên during the Vietnam War in which all of the members of a United States Army Special Forces detachment were injured during the fighting.

On June 16, 2025, the Standing Committee of the National Assembly issued Resolution No. 1685/NQ-UBTVQH15. The district was dissolved and new wards were rearranged from the district.

== Border crossing ==
A border crossing with Cambodia, called the Tịnh Biên International Border Gate, is located in this district just outside the town of Xuân Biên. The border crossing connects to the Vietnamese National Highway 91. Besides normal Vietnamese visas, this border crossing is listed as a Vietnamese Evia entry point for foreigners.

The border checkpoint on the Cambodian side is called the Phnom Den International Border Gate, which is leads to the Cambodian National Highway 2 towards Phnom Penh.
