= Vĩnh Châu =

Coordinates: 9.333°N 106.000°E

- District-level town (Class-4)
- Vĩnh Châu Town; Thị xã Vĩnh Châu
- Interactive map of Vĩnh Châu
- Country: Vietnam
- Region: Mekong Delta
- Province: Sóc Trăng

Area
  - District-level town (Class-4): 182.78 sq mi (473.39 km^{2})
  - Urban: 59.8838 sq mi (155.0983 km^{2})

Population (2018)
  - District-level town (Class-4): 183,918
  - Density: 897/sq mi (346.2/km^{2})
  - Urban: 76,319
  - Urban density: 1,270/sq mi (492/km^{2})
- Time zone: UTC+7 (UTC + 7)

Vĩnh Châu is a district-level town (thị xã) of Sóc Trăng province in the Mekong Delta region of Vietnam. On August 25, 2011, Vĩnh Châu became a town and had a population of 163,918. The town covers an area of 473 km^{2}.

== Administrative divisions ==
- 4 phường (wards):
  - Phường 1
  - Phường 2
  - Khánh Hoà
  - Vĩnh Phước
- 6 xã (communes):
  - Hoà Đông
  - Lạc Hoà
  - Lai Hoà
  - Vĩnh Hải
  - Vĩnh Hiệp
  - Vĩnh Tân
