= Hương Thủy (town) =

Coordinates: 16°24′00″N 107°41′20″E

- District-level town (Class-4)
- Hương Thủy Town; Thị xã Hương Thủy
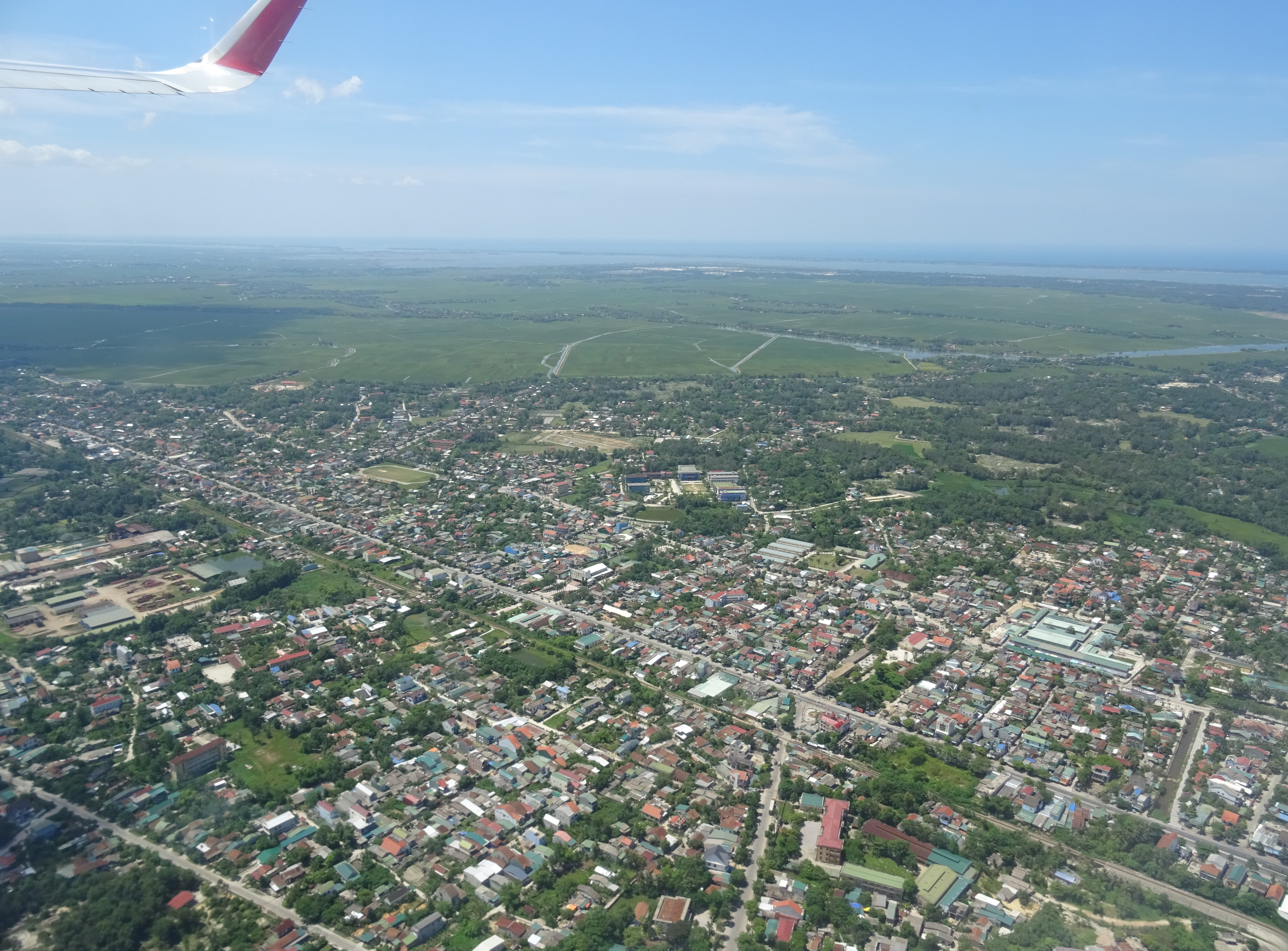
- Country: Vietnam
- Region: North Central Coast
- Municipality: Huế
- Dissolution: 1 July 2025
- Capital: Phú Bài

Area
  - Total: 164.85 sq mi (426.96 km^{2})

Population (2020)
  - Total: 95,299
- Time zone: UTC+7 (UTC + 7)

Hương Thủy was a former district-level town (thị xã) of Huế in the North Central Coast region of Vietnam. As of 2020 the town had a population of 95,299. The town covers an area of 426.96 km^{2} (164.85 sq mi).

This district has five urban wards, Phú Bài, Thủy Châu, Thủy Dương, Thủy Lương and Thủy Phương and five communes, Thủy Phù, Phú Sơn, Dương Hòa, Thủy Tân and Thủy Thanh.

The town is bordered by Phú Lộc District to the east, the city of Huế, the town of Hương Trà and A Lưới District to the west, Nam Đông District to the south, and Phú Vang District to the north.
