= Municipal city =

Former type of second-tier subdivision of Vietnam

A municipal city (Vietnamese: Thành phố thuộc thành phố trực thuộc trung ương, lit. 'City that belongs to a city under direct central control'), commonly known as a city within a city, was a former type of second tier subdivision of Vietnam along with urban district, district, town and provincial city, all of which have equal status. This administrative level was abolished on July 1, 2025.

A municipal city is a satellite city of a municipality in Vietnam.

Referring to local organizing governance's law which was approved by the thirteenth National Assembly on June 19, 2015, the term "municipal city" was available from January 1, 2016. This entity was created to make a new "Urban Governance" project (or Urban Administration model) in Ho Chi Minh City and other cities.

Cities in Vietnam
Cities: red (special class), pink (class 1)

== History ==
Ho Chi Minh City planned to merge 3 districts 2, 9, and Thủ Đức to create an innovation city or a city within city called Thủ Đức City, which is expected to be Vietnam's Silicon Valley. This new city would spread over 211 km^{2} and more than 1 million people, to contribute around 30 percent of the municipality's economic and 4 to 5 percent of the country's gross domestic product (GDP). The project was later also endorsed by prime minister Nguyễn Xuân Phúc and guided to the next step.

On August 12, 2016, Party Secretary of Hanoi city Hoàng Trung Hải had a meeting with Son Tay's constituents after the fourteenth National Assembly's first session. At the meeting, Chief of Economic Division of Son Tay Phùng Huy Minh requested to re-establish Son Tay into second satellite city-within-city before 2030.

On February 20, 2020, after Prime Minister of Vietnam Nguyễn Xuân Phúc worked with Thừa Thiên-Huế Province to deploy Politburo's resolution numbered 54 to build and develop Thua Thien – Hue to 2030, the Government's Office concluded that there would be a new expanded Hue City alongside Huong Thuy, Huong Tra, Phong Dien and other districts as satellites. Thua Thien-Hue Province is expected to become a municipality in 2021.

In the meeting in July 2020, People's Council of Haiphong city announced that Thuy Nguyen would have a municipal city model before 2030.

On 22 February 2022, Party Secretary of Hanoi city Đinh Tiến Dũng had a meeting with Ha Dong's constituents after the fifteenth National Assembly's first session. At the meeting, Chief of Economic Division of Ha Dong Cấn Thị Việt Hà requested to re-establish Ha Dong into new satellite city-within-city before 2025.

On 1 July 2025, the municipal city status was abolished along with other second-tier administrative subdivisions nationwide.

== List of municipal cities before abolished ==
| Name | Municipality | Area (km^{2}) | Population | Population density | Established | Class |
|---|---|---|---|---|---|---|
| Thủ Đức | Ho Chi Minh City | 211.56 | 1,013,795 | 4,800 | 2020 | I |
| Thủy Nguyên | Haiphong | 269.10 | 397,570 | 1,477 | 2025 | III |

== See also ==
- List of cities in Vietnam
- Provinces of Vietnam
