= Provincial city (Vietnam) =

Former type of second-level subdivision of Vietnam

A provincial city (Vietnamese: thành phố thuộc tỉnh) is a former type of second-level subdivision of Vietnam. It had equal status along with urban districts, rural districts, municipal cities, and towns. Under Decree No. 42/2009/ND-CP, provincial cities were officially classified into Class-1, Class-2 or Class-3. This tier of local government was abolished in the 2025 reforms.

At the third tier, provincial cities were divided into wards in the urban core and communes in the surrounding transitional and rural areas. Their equivalents in municipalities are municipal cities.

Cities in Vietnam
Cities: red (special class), pink (class 1)

== Facts ==
Cities are usually provincial urban and administrative centers. Some cities also was appointed provincial economic centers and the culture center of a region (between provinces). There might still agricultural population in the suburban of provincial cities (desakota model). Provincial cities are divided into wards (within the inner city) and communes (within the suburban). Cities are equal level with counties, urban districts or towns, but larger and more important. At the time of 2020, seven cities: Bắc Ninh, Dĩ An, Đông Hà, Huế (Provincial city), Sóc Trăng, Thủ Dầu Một and Vĩnh Long, do not have any rural commune, that means those cities are fully urbanized.

== List of provincial cities ==
Provincial capitals

Name	Province	Area (km^{2})	Population	Population density	Established	Class
Bà Rịa	Bà Rịa–Vũng Tàu	91.47	205,192	2,200	2012	I
Bạc Liêu	Bạc Liêu	175.38	158,264	1,370	2010	II
Bảo Lộc	Lâm Đồng	232.56	158,981	640	2010	III
Bắc Giang	Bắc Giang	258.30	375,000	1,458	2005	II
Bắc Kạn	Bắc Kạn	137.00	45,036	330	2015	III
Bắc Ninh	Bắc Ninh	82.61	259,924	2,707	2006	I
Biên Hòa	Đồng Nai	264.08	1,575,000	6,182	1976	I
Bến Cát	Bình Dương	234.35	355,663	1,518	2024	III
Bến Tre	Bến Tre	71.12	124,560	3,261	2009	II
Buôn Ma Thuột	Đắk Lắk	377.18	375,590	996	1995	I
Cam Ranh	Khánh Hòa	325.01	138,510	438	2010	III
Cao Bằng	Cao Bằng	107.63	73,549	680	2012	III
Cao Lãnh	Đồng Tháp	107.00	213,945	1,999	2007	II
Cà Mau	Cà Mau	250.30	226,372	908	1999	II
Cẩm Phả	Quảng Ninh	486.45	155,800	463	2012	II
Châu Đốc	An Giang	105.29	101,765	967	2013	II
Chí Linh	Hải Dương	282.91	220,421	779	2019	III
Dĩ An	Bình Dương	60.00	463,023	7,711	2020	III
Da Lat	Lâm Đồng	394.90	231,225	586	1893	I
Điện Biên Phủ	Điện Biên	64.27	80,366	261	2003	III
Đông Hà	Quảng Trị	73.06	95,658	1,308	2009	III
Đông Triều	Quảng Ninh	395.95	246,290	622	2024	III
Đồng Hới	Quảng Bình	155.54	133,818	859	2004	II
Đồng Xoài	Bình Phước	169.60	108,595	649	2018	III
Gò Công	Tiền Giang	101.69	99,657	980	2024	III
Gia Nghĩa	Đắk Nông	284.11	63,046	222	2019	III
Hà Giang	Hà Giang	135.32	55,559	416	2010	III
Hà Tiên	Kiên Giang	100.49	48,644	451	2018	III
Hà Tĩnh	Hà Tĩnh	56.19	202,062	3,574	2007	II
Hạ Long	Quảng Ninh	1,119.12	322,710	288	1993	I
Hải Dương	Hải Dương	111.68	508,190	4,550	1997	I
Hòa Bình	Hòa Bình	148.20	135,718	389	2006	III
Hoa Lư	Ninh Bình	150.23	300,726	2,002	2007	II
Hội An	Quảng Nam	61.47	98,599	1,604	2008	III
Hồng Ngự	Đồng Tháp	121.84	100,610	826	2020	III
Hưng Yên	Hưng Yên	73.89	118,646	1,606	2009	III
Kon Tum	Kon Tum	432.12	168,264	389	2009	II
Lai Châu	Lai Châu	92.37	42,973	465	2013	III
Lạng Sơn	Lạng Sơn	77.94	103,284	1,325	2002	II
Lào Cai	Lào Cai	229.67	130,671	463	2004	II
Long Khánh	Đồng Nai	195.00	171,276	893	2019	III
Long Xuyên	An Giang	106.87	272,365	2,361	1999	I
Móng Cái	Quảng Ninh	516.60	108,553	209	2008	II
Mỹ Tho	Tiền Giang	79.80	228,109	2,798	1967	I
Nam Định	Nam Định	46.40	236,294	5,092	1921	I
Ngã Bảy	Hậu Giang	78.07	55,674	712	2020	III
Nha Trang	Khánh Hòa	251.00	422,601	1,912	1977	I
Phan Rang–Tháp Chàm	Ninh Thuận	78.90	167,394	2,114	2007	II
Phan Thiết	Bình Thuận	206.00	226,736	1,075	1999	II
Phổ Yên	Thái Nguyên	258.42	231,363	895	2022	III
Phủ Lý	Hà Nam	87.87	158,212	1,805	2008	II
Phú Mỹ	Bà Rịa–Vũng Tàu	333.84	179,688	538	2025	III
Phú Quốc	Kiên Giang	589.27	144,460	245	2020	I
Phúc Yên	Vĩnh Phúc	120.13	155,575	1,295	2018	III
Pleiku	Gia Lai	266.61	254,802	977	1999	I
Quảng Ngãi	Quảng Ngãi	160.15	261,417	1,634	2005	II
Quy Nhon	Bình Định	284.28	390,053	1,400	1986	I
Rạch Giá	Kiên Giang	105.00	228,416	2,158	2005	I
Sa Đéc	Đồng Tháp	59.81	106,198	1,776	2013	II
Sầm Sơn	Thanh Hóa	45.00	109,208	2,430	2017	II
Sóc Trăng	Sóc Trăng	76.15	203,056	2,672	2007	II
Sơn La	Sơn La	324.93	106,052	328	2008	II
Sông Công	Thái Nguyên	98.37	69,382	705	2015	III
Tam Điệp	Ninh Bình	104.98	62,866	604	2015	III
Tam Kỳ	Quảng Nam	92.02	122,374	1,221	2006	II
Tân An	Long An	81.95	145,120	1,771	2009	II
Tân Uyên	Bình Dương	192.50	466,053	2,430	2023	III
Tây Ninh	Tây Ninh	140.00	135,254	967	2013	III
Thái Bình	Thái Bình	67.71	206,037	3,043	2004	II
Thái Nguyên	Thái Nguyên	189.71	340,403	1,190	1962	I
Thanh Hóa	Thanh Hóa	146.77	359,910	2,452	1994	I
Thủ Dầu Một	Bình Dương	118.87	336,705	2,832	2012	I
Thuận An	Bình Dương	83.69	618,984	7,394	2020	III
Trà Vinh	Trà Vinh	68.03	112,584	1,655	2010	II
Tuy Hòa	Phú Yên	106.82	155,921	1,460	2005	II
Tuyên Quang	Tuyên Quang	119.17	232,230	1,260	2010	II
Từ Sơn	Bắc Ninh	61.1	196,404	3,214	2021	III
Uông Bí	Quảng Ninh	256.31	120,982	472	2011	II
Vị Thanh	Hậu Giang	118.65	72,686	612	2010	II
Việt Trì	Phú Thọ	111.17	315,850	2,826	1962	I
Vinh	Nghệ An	104.98	339,114	3,230	1927	I
Vĩnh Long	Vĩnh Long	48.01	137,870	2,883	2009	II
Vĩnh Yên	Vĩnh Phúc	50.80	114,908	2,262	2006	II
Vũng Tàu	Bà Rịa–Vũng Tàu	140.65	420,860	2,983	1991	I
Yên Bái	Yên Bái	108.16	100,631	930	2002	III

== See also ==
- List of cities in Vietnam
