= Phong Điền (town) =

Phong Điền town Thị xã Phong Điền
- District-level town (Class-4)
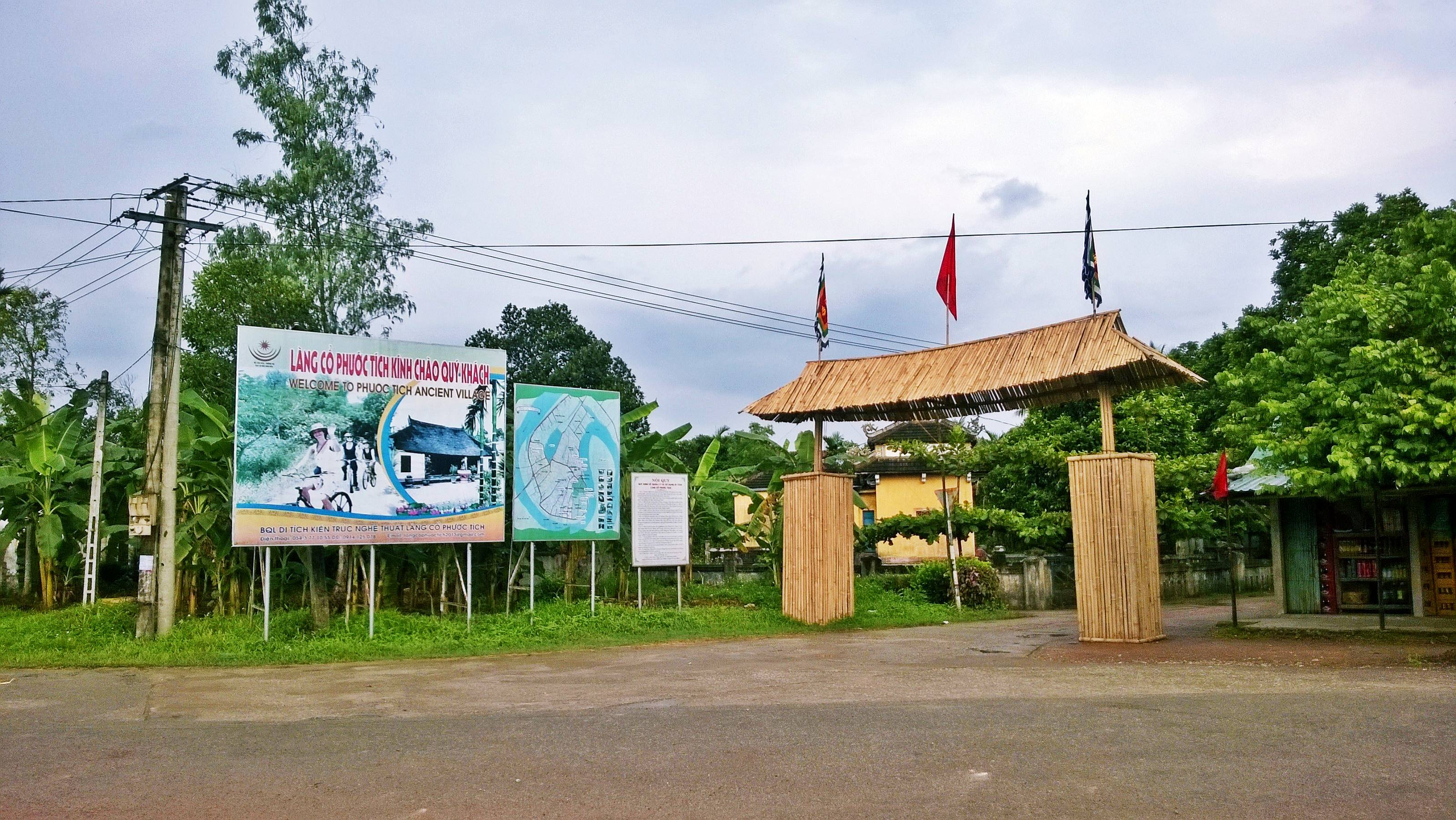
- Entrance to Phước Tích village.

- Location within Vietnam
- Country: Vietnam
- Region: North Central Coast
- Municipality: Huế
- Central hall: 31 Pho Trach,Phong Thu ward

Government
  - Type: Rural district

Area
  - Total: 954 km^{2} (368 sq mi)

Population (2003)
  - Total: 105,017
  - Density: 110/km^{2} (285/sq mi)
- Time zone: UTC+07:00 (Indochina Time)

Phong Điền is a former district-level town of Huế city in the North Central Coast region of Vietnam.

== Administration ==
Phong Dien town has 12 administrative units at commune level, including 6 wards: Phong An, Phong Hai, Phong Hien, Phong Hoa, Phong Phu, Phong Thu and 6 communes: Phong Binh, Phong Chuong, Phong My, Phong Son, Phong Thanh, Phong Xuan.

== History ==
Phong Dien district was established in the 16th year of Minh Mang (1835) under Thua Thien prefecture.

After 1975, Phong Dien district belonged to Binh Tri Thien province, including 14 communes: Dien Hai, Dien Hoa, Dien Huong, Dien Loc, Dien Mon, Phong An, Phong Binh, Phong Chuong, Phong Hai, Phong Hien, Phong Hoa, Phong My, Phong Son, Phong Thu.

On March 11, 1977, Huong Dien district was established on the basis of merging Phong Dien, Quang Dien and Huong Tra districts into Binh Tri Thien province (1976 - 1989).[5]

On May 18, 1981, Phong Xuan commune was established in the new economic zone.

On June 30, 1989, Huong Dien district belonged to Thua Thien Hue province which had just been re-established.

On September 29, 1990, Huong Dien district was divided back into 3 old districts of Thua Thien Hue province.

On November 22, 1995, Phong Dien town (district town of Phong Dien district) was established on the basis of Vinh Nguyen, Trach Thuong, Trach Ta, Khanh My villages of Phong Thu commune and Tan Lap village of Phong An commune with 1,821 hectares of natural area and 4,502 people.

By the end of 2023, Phong Dien district had 16 commune-level administrative units, including Phong Dien town and 15 communes: Dien Hai, Dien Hoa, Dien Huong, Dien Loc, Dien Mon, Phong An, Phong Binh, Phong Chuong, Phong Hai, Phong Hien, Phong Hoa, Phong My, Phong Son, Phong Thu, Phong Xuan.

On August 2, 2024, the Ministry of Construction issued:

Decision No. 750/QD-BXD[2] on recognizing the area planned to establish Phong Dien town as meeting the criteria for a type IV urban area.

Decision No. 751/QD-BXD[10] on recognizing the area planned to establish wards in Phong Dien urban area, Thua Thien Hue province as meeting the standards for urban infrastructure development level for wards of a type IV urban area.

November 30, 2024:

The National Assembly issued Resolution No. 175/2024/QH15[11] on the establishment of Hue city under the central government on the basis of the entire area and population of Thua Thien Hue province. The National Assembly Standing Committee issued Resolution No. 1314/NQ-UBTVQH15[1] on the arrangement of district-level and commune-level administrative units of Hue city for the period 2023 - 2025 (the resolution takes effect from January 1, 2025). Accordingly: Establishing Phong Dien town under Hue city on the basis of the entire 945.66 km^{2} (365.12 sq mi) natural area and population of 105,597 people of Phong Dien district. Arranging and establishing wards and communes under Phong Dien town: Establishing 3 wards: Phong An, Phong Hien, Phong Hoa on the basis of 3 communes with corresponding names. Establishing Phong Thu ward on the basis of Phong Dien town and Phong Thu commune. Establishing Phong Hai ward on the basis of Dien Hai commune and Phong Hai commune. Establishing Phong Phu ward on the basis of Dien Loc commune and Dien Hoa commune. Establish Phong Thanh commune on the basis of Dien Huong commune and Dien Mon commune. After establishment, Phong Dien town has 6 wards and 6 communes as present.

== Population ==
As of 2003, the district had a population of 105,017.
