= Ninh Hải =

- Commune
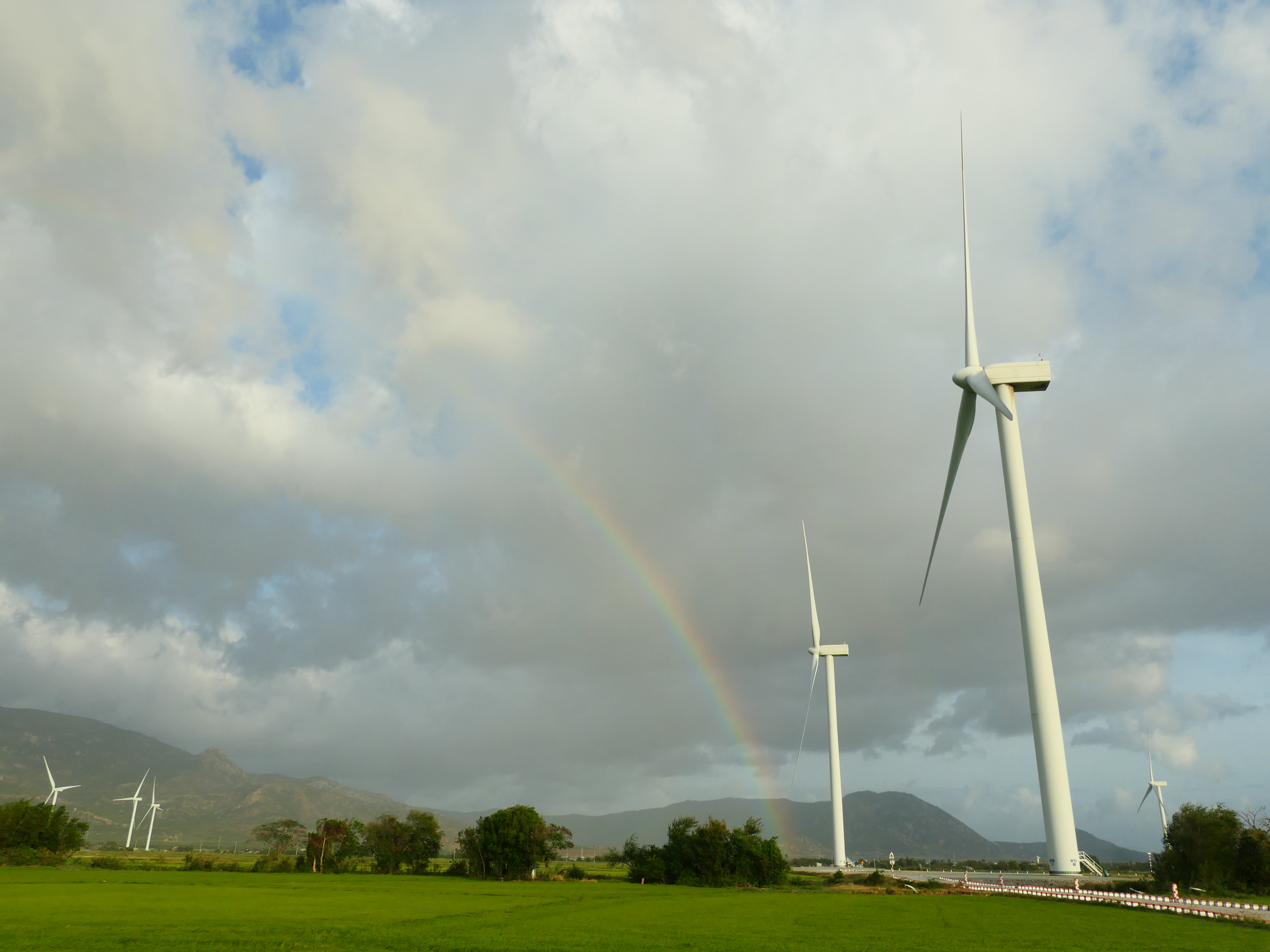
- Đầm Nại Wind Farm
- Interactive map of Ninh Hải
- Coordinates: 11.638148821502739°N 109.04885571721118°E
- Country: Vietnam
- Region: South Central Coast and Central Highlands
- Province: Khánh Hòa
- Established: 2025
- Administrative headquarters: Phương Cựu 3 Hamlet

Area
  - Total: 100.13 km^{2} (38.66 sq mi)

Population (31 December 2024)
  - Total: 31,115
  - Density: 310/km^{2} (800/sq mi)
- Website: ninhhai.khanhhoa.gov.vn

Ninh Hải is a commune in Khánh Hòa province, Vietnam.

On 16 June 2025, the Standing Committee of the National Assembly of Vietnam issued Resolution No. 1667/NQ-UBTVQH15 on the arrangement of commune-level administrative units in Khánh Hòa province in 2025. Under the resolution, the entire area and population of Phương Hải and Tri Hải communes, formerly part of Ninh Hải district, and Bắc Sơn commune, formerly part of Thuận Bắc district, were merged to form a new commune named Ninh Hải.
