= Đô Lương =

- Commune
- Interactive map of Đô Lương
- Coordinates: 18.893920394556332°N 105.31900451737194°E
- Country: Vietnam
- Region: North Central Coast
- Province: Nghệ An

Area
  - Total: 50.06 km^{2} (19.33 sq mi)

Population (2025)
  - Total: 61,960
  - Density: 1,237/km^{2} (3,200/sq mi)

Đô Lương is a commune in Nghệ An province, Vietnam.

Đô Lương commune was established under Resolution No. 1678/NQ-UBTVQH15, issued by the Standing Committee of the National Assembly of Vietnam on 16 June 2025. Under the resolution, the entire area and population of Đô Lương township and Bắc Sơn, Nam Sơn, Đà Sơn, Đặng Sơn, Lưu Sơn, Thịnh Sơn, Văn Sơn, and Yên Sơn communes, formerly part of Đô Lương district, were merged to form a new commune named Đô Lương.
