= Hoàng Mai (town) =

- District-level town (Class-4)
- Hoàng Mai Town; Thị xã Hoàng Mai
- Interactive map of Hoàng Mai
- Location within Vietnam Location within Southeast Asia Location within Asia
- Country: Vietnam
- Region: North Central Coast
- Province: Nghệ An
- Established: 3 April 2013
- Capital: Quỳnh Thiện Ward

Area
  - District-level town (Class-4): 169.75 km^{2} (65.54 sq mi)
  - Urban: 49.4383 km^{2} (19.0882 sq mi)

Population (2013)
  - District-level town (Class-4): 105,105
  - Density: 619/km^{2} (1,600/sq mi)
  - Urban: 56,945
  - Urban density: 1,151.8/km^{2} (2,983/sq mi)
- Time zone: UTC+7 (Indochina Time)

Hoàng Mai is a former district-level town of Nghệ An province, in the North Central Coast region of Vietnam.

== History ==
The town was founded on 3 April 2013 on the basis of separation from Quỳnh Lưu Rural District.

According to Project No. 343/ĐA-CP in May 9, 2025, of the Government of Vietnam on arranging commune-level administrative units of Nghệ An Province, the Standing Committee of Vietnam National Assembly decided to dissolve Hoàng Mai Town in terms of administration. Its natural area has been re-organized into three new administrative units :

- Quỳnh Thiện Ward and two communes Quỳnh Trang & Quỳnh Vinh were merged into Hoàng Mai Ward.
- Quỳnh Liên Commune and three wards Mai Hùng & Quỳnh Phương & Quỳnh Xuân were merged into Quỳnh Mai Ward.
- Quỳnh Dị Ward and two communes Quỳnh Lập & Quỳnh Lộc were merged into Tân Mai Ward.

All three new wards are under the direct management of the Nghệ An Provincial People's Committee from July 1, 2025 to present.

== See also ==
- Quỳnh Lưu
