= Đông Ninh Hòa =

- Ward
- Interactive map of Đông Ninh Hòa
- Coordinates: 12°34′20″N 109°13′44″E
- Country: Vietnam
- Region: South Central Coast
- Province: Khánh Hòa
- Established: 2010

Area
  - Total: 8.07 km^{2} (3.12 sq mi)
- Elevation: 66 m (217 ft)

Population
  - Total: 8,357
  - Density: 1,035.6/km^{2} (2,682/sq mi)
- Time zone: UTC+7 (Indochina Time)

Đông Ninh Hòa is a ward of Khánh Hòa Province, Vietnam, which was established in 2010.

Phường Đông Ninh Hòa

Climate chart (precipitation, max. and min. temperature)
J	F	M	A	M	J	J	A	S	O	N	D
40 25 19	29 28 20	56 29 23	56 31 23	65 29 25	132 30 25	104 32 25	111 28 24	323 30 24	270 28 22	439 26 22	137 25 20
- █ Average max. and min. temperatures in °C
- █ Precipitation totals in mm
Imperial conversion
J	F	M	A	M	J	J	A	S	O	N	D
1.6 77 66	1.1 82 68	2.2 84 73	2.2 88 73	2.6 84 77	5.2 86 77	4.1 90 77	4.4 82 75	13 86 75	11 82 72	17 79 72	5.4 77 68
- █ Average max. and min. temperatures in °F
- █ Precipitation totals in inches

Ninh Hải has a savanna climate. The average temperature is 26°C (79°F), with July being the hottest month and January the coldest. The average rainfall is 1,762 mm (69.4 in) per year, the rainiest months being September through November.

The ward is the location of the famous Dốc Lết beach.
