= District-level town =

Former type of second-tier subdivision of Vietnam

Cities in Vietnam
Cities: red (special class), pink (class 1)

A district-level town (Vietnamese: thị xã) is a former type of second tier subdivision of Vietnam. District-level towns had equal status with urban districts, districts, municipal cities, and provincial cites. Towns were officially classified into Class-3 or Class-4 (as a result of Decree No. 42/2009/ND-CP).

District-level towns were abolished in 2025 along with other district-level subdivisions.

Towns could only be the capital of a province, and not of a municipality. At the third tier, towns were divided into wards and communes.

Many provincial capitals were once towns, though many of these became provincial cities.

== District level ==
In Vietnam, there were other kinds of district-level urban subdivision: urban districts (Vietnamese: quận), districts (huyện), municipal cities (thành phố thuộc thành phố trực thuộc trung ương) and provincial cities (thành phố thuộc tỉnh). Urban districts were for urban areas, and only consisted of wards, but provincial cities and towns could consist of wards (in urban areas) and communes (in suburban areas). Towns were similar to provincial cities, but smaller and with a lower population density. Moreover, municipalities could includes towns (such as Sơn Tây, Hanoi), and even municipal cities.

Towns were categorized as urban, with its residents classified as an urban population, although they could include rural areas where residents were involved in agriculture. Main economic activities in towns included industry, services and business.

== Upgrade and downgrade ==
Commune-level towns or townships (Vietnamese: thị trấn) were often upgraded to towns, or district-level towns (Vietnamese: thị xã), and district-level town could develop into provincial cities.

But district-level towns could also be downgraded to a district capital, especially when there was a merger of provinces. Examples include An Lộc (the provincial capital of former Bình Long Province), and Sông Cầu (formerly the provincial capital of Phú Yên Province).

Some district-level towns were downgraded to commune-level towns for a while and then re-established, such as Nghĩa Lộ, Bắc Cạn, Đồ Sơn (which from 2007 became the urban district of Đồ Sơn), Phúc Yên, Hà Tiên, Vị Thanh, and Gia Nghĩa.

When a district-level town was downgraded, the urban area became a commune-level town, while suburban areas were merged into other districts or established as rural communes. Some district-level towns became commune-level towns and were not re-established, for example: Đô Lương, Tiên Yên, Ninh Giang, Cát Bà, and Vĩnh An of Đồng Nai Province.

One unusual example was Phan Rang, a district-level town which was divided into two commune-level towns, Phan Rang and Tháp Chàm, in 1977. Both commune-level towns belonged to a county (Ninh Hải and An Sơn, respectively), and in 1981 the two commune-level towns were merged and were re-established as a county-level town named Phan Rang–Tháp Chàm, and later became a provincial city.

Kiến An, a former district-level town, became a municipality of Hải Phòng from 1962 to 1980, and was later downgraded into a commune-level town. It was reinstated between 1988 to 1994 before becoming an urban district of Hải Phòng.

Đồ Sơn was the only district-level town within a municipality (Hải Phòng). It acquired this status in 1994, and continued to be until September 12, 2007 when it became an urban district of Hải Phòng.

Sơn Tây was a district-level town governed as part of Hanoi from 1978 to 1991, before being merged into Hà Tây Province. It was upgraded into a provincial city in August 2007, but when Hà Tây Province was merged into Hanoi in 2008, Sơn Tây was again made into a district-level town.

== List of district-level towns ==
=== Municipal district-level towns ===
Name	Municipality	Population (person)	Area (km^{2})	Established	Class
Sơn Tây	Hà Nội	230,577	113.50	1884, re-established 2009	III
Hương Thủy	Huế	95,299	426.96	2010	IV
Hương Trà	Huế	72,677	392.32	2011	IV
Phong Điền	Huế	105,597	945.66	2025	IV

=== Provincial district-level towns ===
Name	Province	Population (person)	Area (km^{2})	Established	Class
An Khê	Gia Lai	67,711	200.65	2003	IV
An Nhơn	Bình Định	178,709	242.70	2011	III
Ayun Pa	Gia Lai	41,160	287.00	2007	IV
Ba Đồn	Quảng Bình	106,413	162.30	2013	IV
Bỉm Sơn	Thanh Hóa	69,826	63.86	1981	III
Bình Long	Bình Phước	105,520	126.28	2009	IV
Bình Minh	Vĩnh Long	95,639	93.63	2012	III
Buôn Hồ	Đắk Lắk	100,357	282.61	2008	IV
Cai Lậy	Tiền Giang	143,050	140.20	2008	III
Chơn Thành	Bình Phước	121,083	390.34	2020	IV
Chũ	Bắc Giang	127,881	251.55	2025	IV
Duy Tiên	Hà Nam	177,150	120.92	2019	IV
Duyên Hải	Trà Vinh	77,006	193.40	2015	IV
Điện Bàn	Quảng Nam	226,564	214.28	2015	IV
Đông Hòa	Phú Yên	119,991	265.62	2020	IV
Đức Phổ	Quảng Ngãi	155,743	371.67	2020	IV
Giá Rai	Bạc Liêu	166,324	353.99	2015	IV
Hòa Thành	Tây Ninh	139,853	82.92	2020	IV
Hoài Nhơn	Bình Định	259,287	420.87	2020	IV
Hoàng Mai	Nghệ An	113,360	169.75	2013	IV
Hồng Lĩnh	Hà Tĩnh	36,940	58.95	1992	IV
Kiến Tường	Long An	51,620	204.36	2013	IV
Kim Bảng	Hà Nam	145,744	175.40	2025	IV
Kinh Môn	Hải Dương	215,637	165.33	2019	III
Kỳ Anh	Hà Tĩnh	82,955	280.25	2015	III
La Gi	Bình Thuận	108,519	185.37	2005	III
Long Mỹ	Hậu Giang	61,986	149.27	2015	III
Mộc Châu	Sơn La	148,259	1,072.09	2025	IV
Mường Lay	Điện Biên	11,618	112.67	1971	IV
Mỹ Hào	Hưng Yên	115,608	79.37	2019	IV
Ngã Năm	Sóc Trăng	108,995	241.93	2013	IV
Nghi Sơn	Thanh Hoá	302,210	455.61	2020	IV
Nghĩa Lộ	Yên Bái	68,206	107.78	1995	IV
Ninh Hòa	Khánh Hòa	230,566	1,197.50	2010	IV
Phú Thọ	Phú Thọ	70,653	64.60	1903	III
Phước Long	Bình Phước	81,200	119.38	2009	IV
Quảng Trị	Quảng Trị	23,356	74.00	1989	IV
Quảng Yên	Quảng Ninh	180,028	333.70	2011	III
Quế Võ	Bắc Ninh	223,964	155.11	2023	IV
Sa Pa	Lào Cai	81,857	681.37	2019	IV
Sông Cầu	Phú Yên	120,780	492.80	2009	III
Tân Châu	An Giang	141,342	176.7	2009	III
Thái Hòa	Nghệ An	66,127	135.14	2007	IV
Thuận Thành	Bắc Ninh	199,577	117.83	2023	IV
Tịnh Biên	An Giang	143,098	354.59	2023	IV
Trảng Bàng	Tây Ninh	235,352	340.14	2020	IV
Vĩnh Châu	Sóc Trăng	211,418	471.00	2011	IV
Việt Yên	Bắc Giang	229,162	171.01	2024	IV

== See also ==
- Mueang
- Urban township
