= District (Vietnam) =

Former type of second-tier subdivision of Vietnam

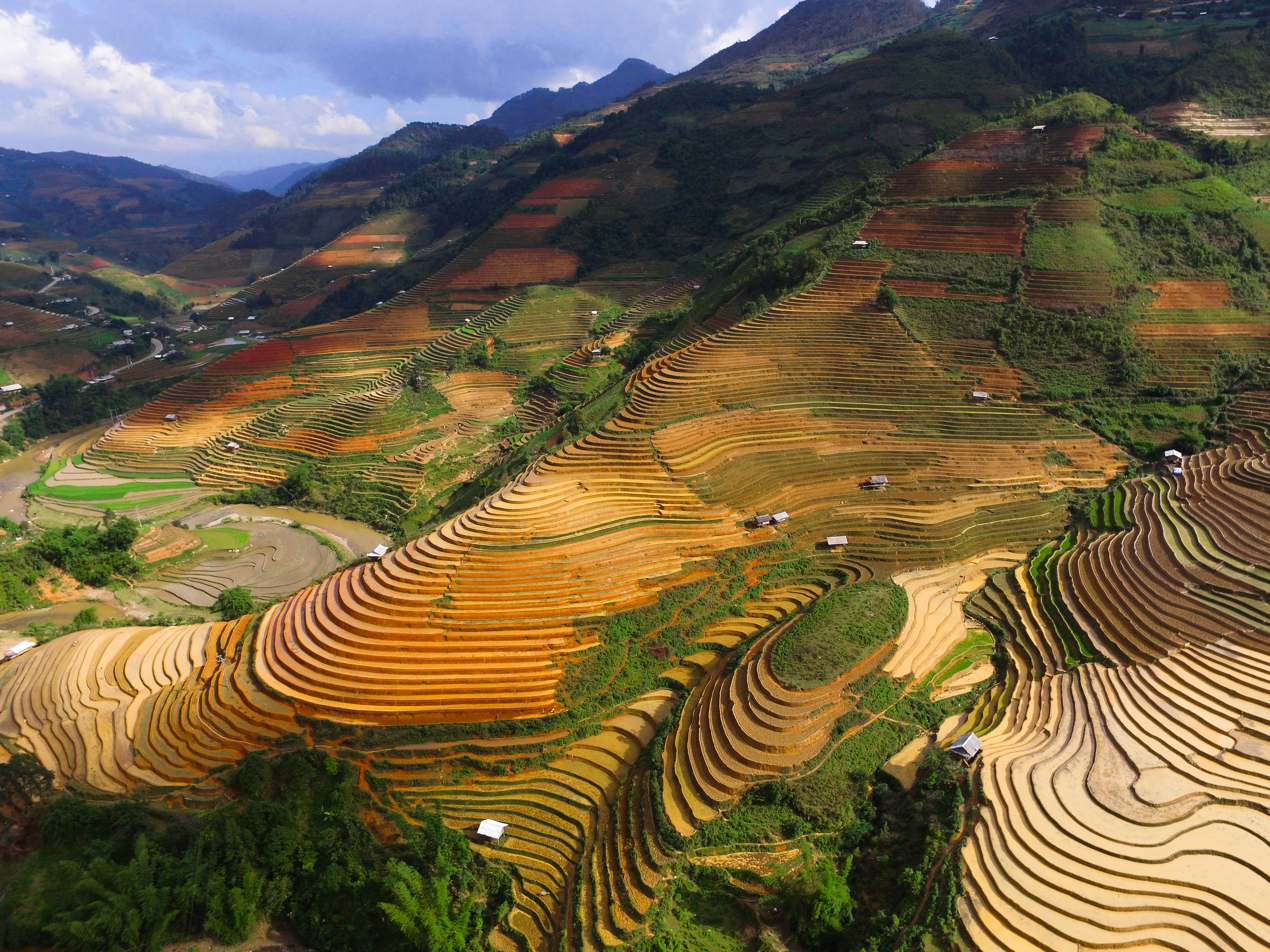

Districts (Vietnamese: huyện), also known as rural districts or counties, were one of several types of former second-tier administrative subdivisions of Vietnam, the other types being urban districts (Vietnamese: quận), provincial cities (thành phố trực thuộc tỉnh), municipal cities (thành phố thuộc thành phố trực thuộc trung ương), and district-level towns (thị xã). The districts were subdivisions of the first-tier divisions, namely the provinces and municipalities. Districts were subdivided into third-tier units, namely townships and communes.

Districts and the whole second-tier of administrative subdivisions of Vietnam were eliminated in 2025, following a major governmental reform.

== History ==
The districts existed since the 11th century. Prior to 1945 the huyện (chữ Hán: 縣) was also called district and earlier "sub-prefecture" of the prefectures, or phủ into which provinces were previously divided. (Note: Hack & Rettig 2005 31 Phủ is an administrative subdivision of a province 32 Huyện is an administrative subdivision of a Phủ) (Note: Lach & Van Kley 1998, p. 1278 The huyện was an administrative unit – a subprefecture – within the province, which first came into use in the fifteenth century. (Note: Whitfield 1976, p. 118 Each province was divided into several phu or prefectures)) The administrative reorganization by Minh Mạng of Nguyen dynasty in 1832 did not substantially affect the position of the huyện, but concentrated administration of the level above the huyện, the phủ under new larger unit of the tỉnh and provincial governors. The position of local prefects and district heads remained unaffected. (Note: Gallica 1834, p. 475 A cette époque il a voulu marcher sur les traces de l'empereur de Chine et a divisé son royaume en tinh ou métropoles. Il y a laissé les phù et les huyên comme auparavant. L'ordre a été changé, mais le fond de l'administration est le même.) (Note: Ramsay 2008, p. 37 Provinces (tỉnh) over which directly appointed governors-general (tổngđốc), one to every two provinces, and every two provinces, and governors (tuấn phủ), to every other province, ruled. Under the provincial structure, a descending hierarchy of smaller territorial jurisdictions was organized: these included the prefecture (phủ), the district (huyện), the canton (tổng), and the village ... Just as bureaucratic order provided the foundation for the administration of the kingdom, attention to key sites of ritual power projected.)

== See also ==
- List of districts of Vietnam
- List of urban districts of Vietnam
- Commune-level subdivisions (Vietnam): commune (xã), commune-level town (thị trấn), urban commune (ward, phường)
- Ward (Vietnam): phường, sub (urban district)

== Sources ==
- "Gallica". Journal asiatique (in French). Paris, France: Société asiatique, Centre national de la récherche scientifique. 1834.
- Hack, Karl; Rettig, Tobias, eds. (2005). Colonial Armies in Southeast Asia. Routledge. ISBN 978-0415334136.
- Lach, Donald F.; Van Kley, Edwin J. (1998). A Century of Advance. Asia in the Making of Europe. Vol. III. UP Chicago. ISBN 978-0226467696.
- Ramsay, Jacob (2008). Mandarins and Martyrs: The Church and the Nguyen Dynasty in Early Nineteenth-Century Vietnam. UP Stanford. ISBN 978-0804756518.
- Whitfield, Danny J. (1976). Historical and Cultural Dictionary of Vietnam. Rowman & Littlefield / Methuen. ISBN 978-0810808874.
