= Rạch Giá (city) =

Former provincial city and capital of the former Kiên Giang province, Vietnam

- Provincial city (Class-1)
- Rạch Giá City; Thành phố Rạch Giá
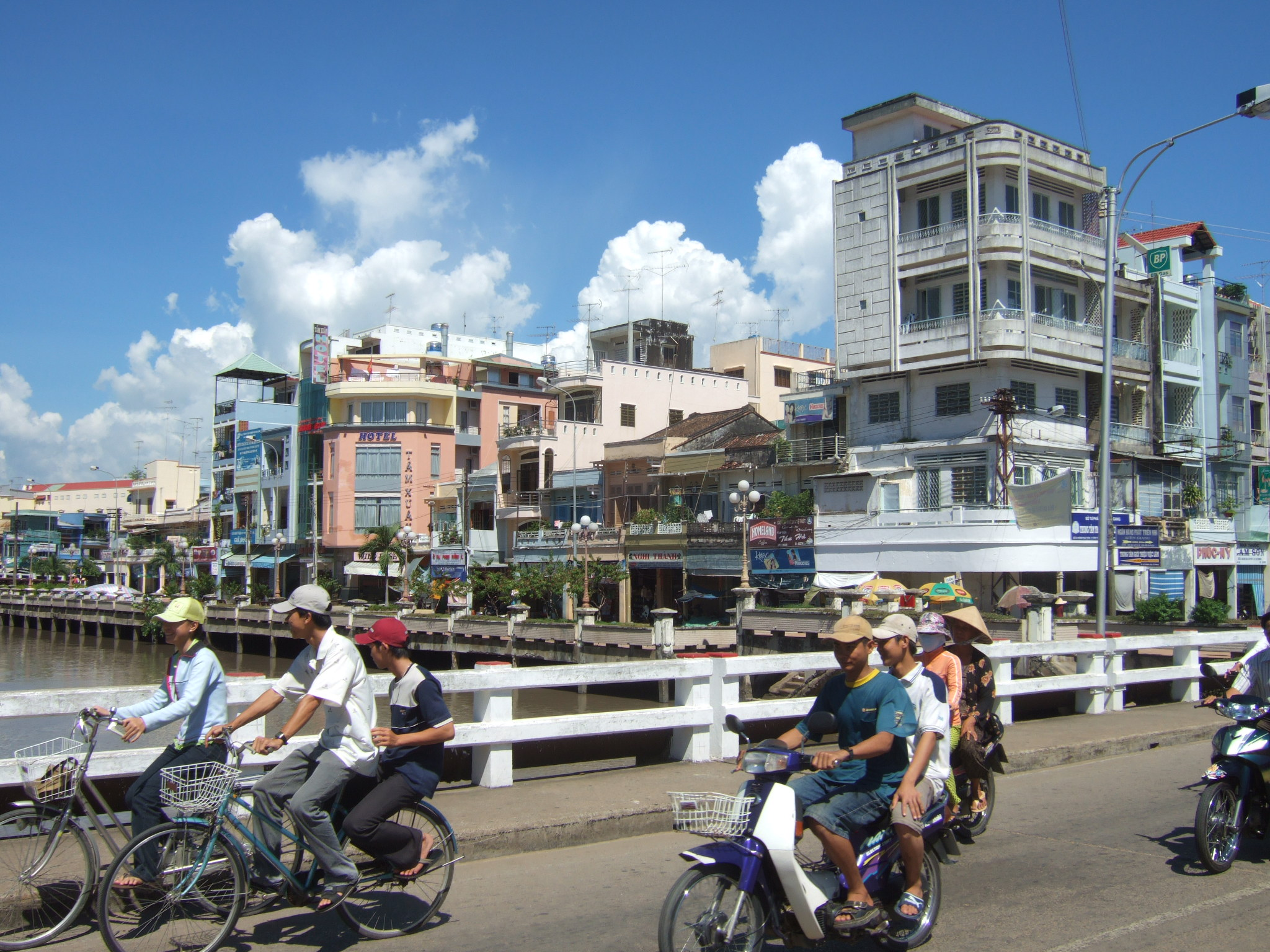
- Nguyễn Trung Trực street

- Location of Rạch Giá in Vietnam
- Coordinates: 10°1′0″N 105°5′0″E
- Country: Vietnam
- Province: Kiên Giang

Area
  - Total: 105.86 km^{2} (40.87 sq mi)

Population (2024)
  - Total: 459.860
  - Density: 4,344/km^{2} (11,250/sq mi)

Rạch Giá is a former provincial city and the former capital of Kiên Giang province, Vietnam. It is located on the Eastern coast of the Gulf of Thailand, 250 kilometres (160 mi) southwest of Ho Chi Minh City. East of city, it borders Tân Hiệp and Châu Thành districts, the Gulf of Thailand is to the West and surrounds some parts of the city, south of the city is Châu Thành and An Biên districts, and to the North it borders Hòn Đất and Tân Hiệp districts.

On 1 July 2025, Rạch Giá ceased to exist as a municipal city following the elimination of district level units in Vietnam.

== Administrative units ==
Rạch Giá was upgraded from a town to a city by Government Decree No. 97/2005/NĐ-CP on July 26, 2005. The city has 12 administrative units:

- Vĩnh Thanh Vân Ward
- Vĩnh Thanh Ward
- Vĩnh Lạc Ward
- Vĩnh Lợi Ward
- Vĩnh Quang Ward
- An Hòa Ward
- An Bình Ward
- Rạch Sỏi Ward
- Vĩnh Thông Ward
- Vĩnh Hiệp Ward
- Phi Thông Commune

Rạch Giá is the first city where the Vietnamese government applied a "lấn biển" project to build out to the ocean to expand territory. The "lấn biển" project expanded the city to become one of the biggest new cities in southwest Vietnam. This project added 2 more new wards in Rạch Giá. Besides that, several future construction projects such as industrial center Rach Vuot and urban city Vĩnh Hiệp which will be started after finishing Lạc Hồng Bridge will expand Rạch Giá to the east.

== Cultures and tourism ==
The ceremony of Nguyễn Trung Trực is held annually in lunar August.

== Historic ==
National historical sites:

- Nguyễn Trung Trực Temple
- Tam Bảo Temple
- Vĩnh Hoà temple
- Huỳnh Mẫn Đạt grave
- Phật Lớn pagoda
- Láng Cát pagoda
- Kiên Giang museum
- Quan Đế pagoda

Other historical sites:

- Sắc Tứ Tam Bảo Temple
- Tam quan gate. This is the historical main gate and the symbol of Rạch Giá City.
- Nguyễn Hiền Điều temple
- Suông council
- Bắc Đế temple
- Thiên Hậu temple
- Thiên Hậu Palace

== Climate ==
Rạch Giá has a tropical savanna climate (Köppen Aw), not quite wet enough to be classified as a tropical monsoon climate (Am) though wetter than most climates of its type. There is a very pronounced dry season from December to March, but rainfall is consistently heavy for the remaining eight months of the year.

Climate data for Rạch Giá
| Month | Jan | Feb | Mar | Apr | May | Jun | Jul | Aug | Sep | Oct | Nov | Dec | Year |
|---|---|---|---|---|---|---|---|---|---|---|---|---|---|
| Record high °C (°F) | 35.6 (96.1) | 35.4 (95.7) | 37.8 (100.0) | 37.9 (100.2) | 37.7 (99.9) | 34.7 (94.5) | 34.0 (93.2) | 34.0 (93.2) | 34.4 (93.9) | 33.9 (93.0) | 34.0 (93.2) | 34.8 (94.6) | 37.9 (100.2) |
| Mean daily maximum °C (°F) | 30.4 (86.7) | 31.6 (88.9) | 32.9 (91.2) | 33.5 (92.3) | 32.1 (89.8) | 30.7 (87.3) | 30.1 (86.2) | 29.9 (85.8) | 30.1 (86.2) | 30.7 (87.3) | 30.6 (87.1) | 30.0 (86.0) | 31.0 (87.8) |
| Daily mean °C (°F) | 25.8 (78.4) | 26.5 (79.7) | 27.7 (81.9) | 28.9 (84.0) | 28.8 (83.8) | 28.3 (82.9) | 27.9 (82.2) | 27.7 (81.9) | 27.7 (81.9) | 27.6 (81.7) | 27.2 (81.0) | 26.1 (79.0) | 27.5 (81.5) |
| Mean daily minimum °C (°F) | 22.4 (72.3) | 22.8 (73.0) | 24.0 (75.2) | 25.5 (77.9) | 26.1 (79.0) | 26.0 (78.8) | 25.7 (78.3) | 25.5 (77.9) | 25.5 (77.9) | 25.2 (77.4) | 24.7 (76.5) | 23.1 (73.6) | 24.7 (76.5) |
| Record low °C (°F) | 14.8 (58.6) | 16.9 (62.4) | 17.1 (62.8) | 21.5 (70.7) | 22.0 (71.6) | 21.7 (71.1) | 21.9 (71.4) | 21.9 (71.4) | 22.2 (72.0) | 21.3 (70.3) | 19.0 (66.2) | 16.3 (61.3) | 14.8 (58.6) |
| Average rainfall mm (inches) | 13.4 (0.53) | 10.9 (0.43) | 34.9 (1.37) | 89.9 (3.54) | 251.8 (9.91) | 277.7 (10.93) | 315.8 (12.43) | 335.9 (13.22) | 301.1 (11.85) | 295.6 (11.64) | 177.4 (6.98) | 46.6 (1.83) | 2,151.1 (84.69) |
| Average rainy days | 2.2 | 1.5 | 3.4 | 7.5 | 16.8 | 19.5 | 20.3 | 21.2 | 20.0 | 21.1 | 15.8 | 6.1 | 155.6 |
| Average relative humidity (%) | 78.8 | 77.9 | 76.5 | 78.2 | 82.5 | 84.1 | 85.0 | 85.6 | 85.0 | 84.1 | 81.6 | 79.4 | 81.5 |
| Mean monthly sunshine hours | 244.2 | 236.6 | 256.6 | 249.9 | 207.1 | 173.8 | 176.4 | 166.3 | 161.0 | 176.1 | 203.3 | 223.5 | 2,469.8 |
Source: Vietnam Institute for Building Science and Technology

== Transportation ==
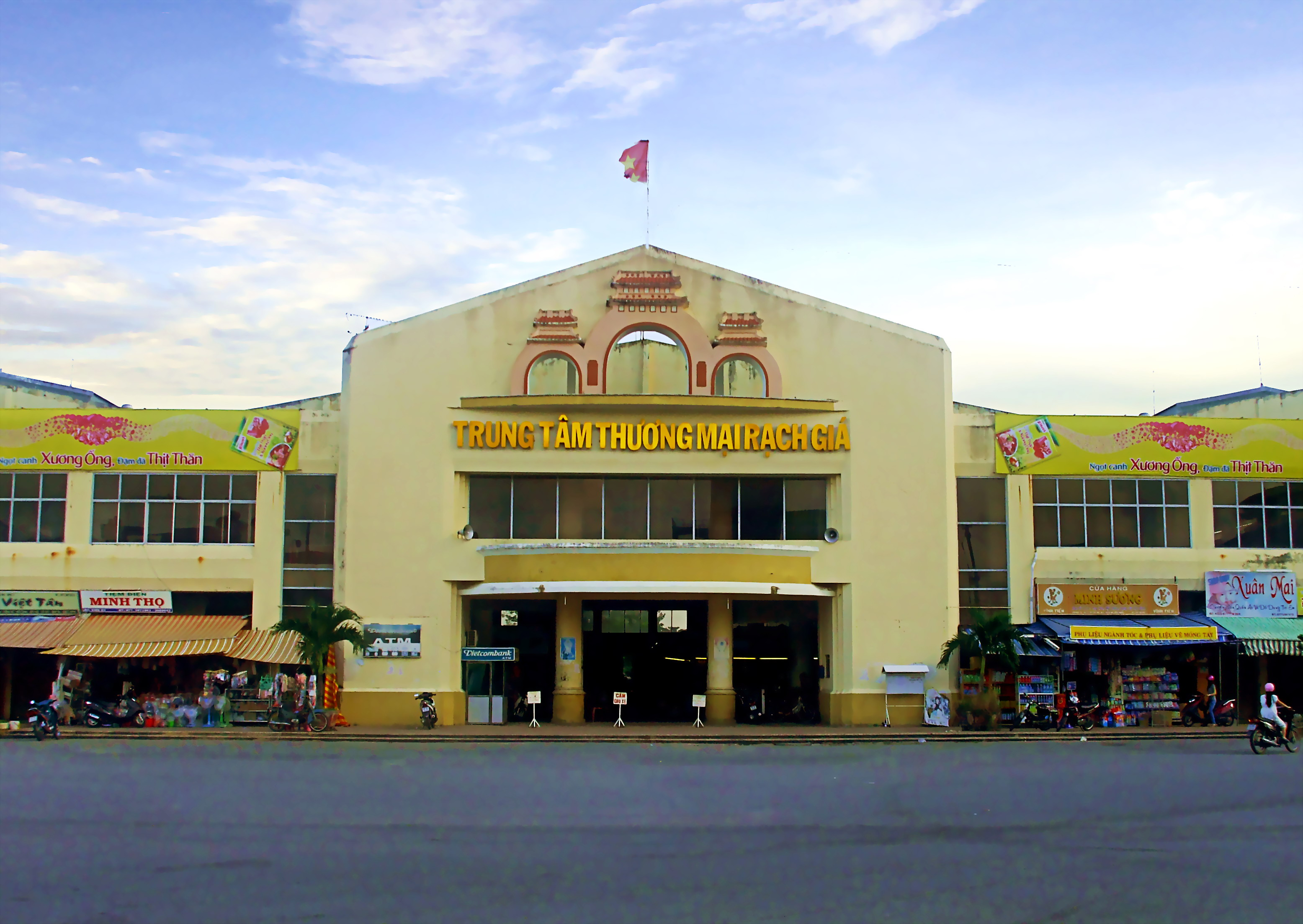
Trung tâm thương mại Rạch Giá

Rạch Giá has 2 main stations: Rạch Sỏi station (main routes to neighbor towns or provinces on highway 61 and 63) and Rạch Giá station (main routes to Ho Chi Minh City and Hà Tiên). Those are the main stations to transport passengers to other towns in the province, or to other provinces in Vietnam.

The bus transportation system was developed pretty early. Passengers can take the bus from Rạch Giá to 4 other towns: Châu Thành (route Rạch Giá – Tắc Cậu), Giồng Riềng (route Rạch Giá – Giồng Riềng), Tân Hiệp (route Rạch Giá – Kinh B), Hòn Đất (route Rạch Giá – Tám Ngàn).

Currently, Rạch Giá Airport is the biggest airport in Rạch Giá. Rạch Giá airport has flight routes to Ho Chi Minh City with Vietnam Airlines.

Rạch Giá has 2 big ship stations: Rạch Giá ship station or Phú Quốc ship station (routes to Phú Quốc island and other big islands such as Phú Quốc, Hon Tre, Hòn Sơn and Thổ Chu) and Rạch Mẽo station (route to rural towns of Cà Mau Peninsula). High speed ship is the economic choice for passengers to Phú Quốc island or Kiên Hải islands.
