= Nguyễn Trung Trực Temple =

- Đình thần Nguyễn Trung Trực
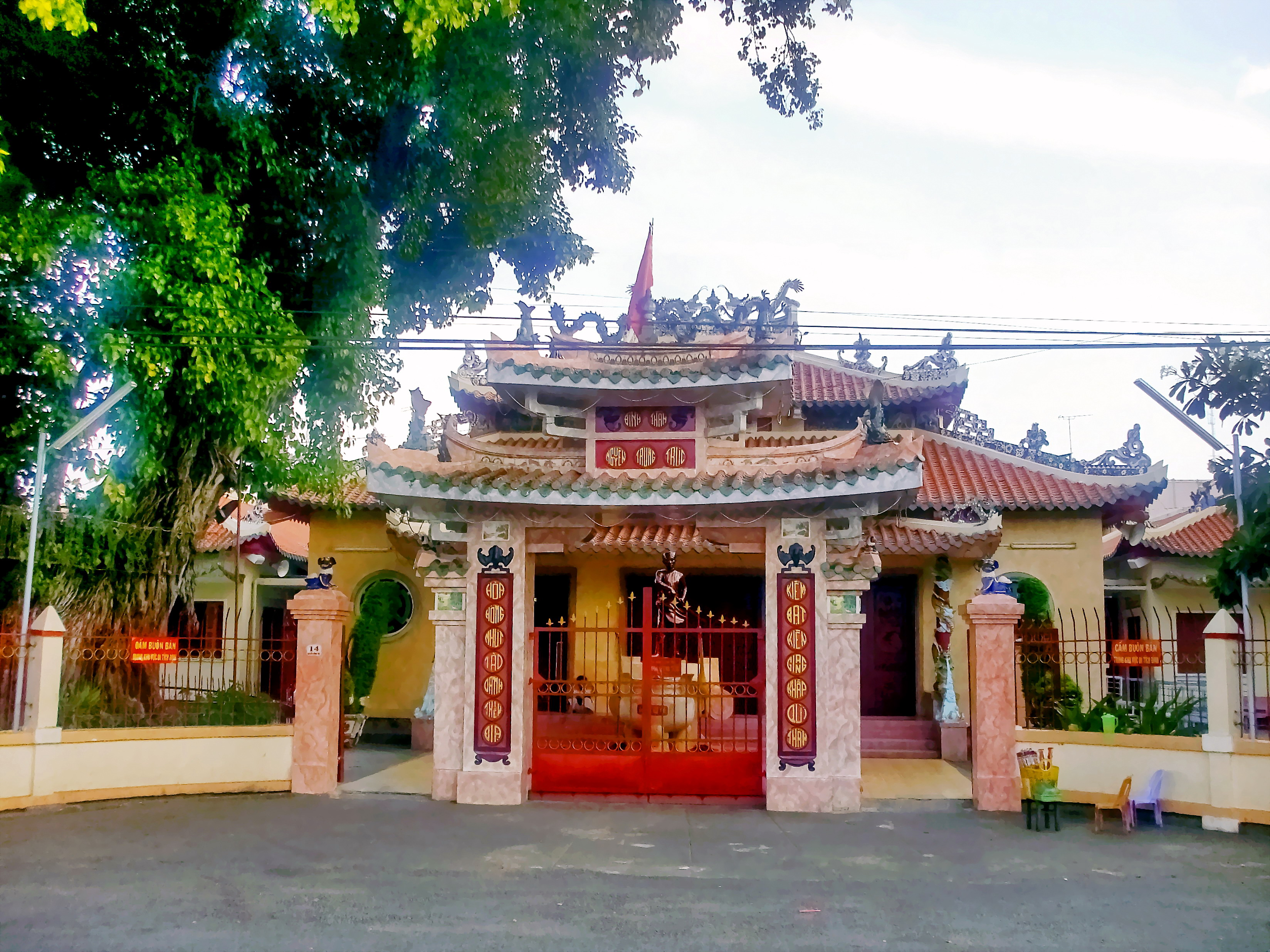
- The temple's main gate

Location
- Location: 14 Nguyễn Công Trứ Street, Vĩnh Thanh Vân Ward, Rạch Giá, Kiên Giang Province, Vietnam
- Interactive map of Nguyễn Trung Trực Temple
- Coordinates: 10°00′42″N 105°04′46″E

Architecture
- Type: Vietnamese temple
- Founder: Local fishermen and residents
- Designated: 1988

Website
- http://nguyentrungtruc.com.vn

Nguyễn Trung Trực Temple (Vietnamese: Đình thần Nguyễn Trung Trực), also known as the Nguyễn Trung Trực Shrine, is a historical and cultural temple located in Rạch Giá, Kiên Giang Province, Vietnam. Dedicated to the 19th-century anti-French resistance leader Nguyễn Trung Trực, it is the oldest and largest among nine temples honoring him in the region. Recognized as a national historical-cultural relic in 1988, the temple integrates worship, community services, and annual festivals that preserve Vietnamese patriotic traditions.

== History ==
The temple originated in the late 1860s or early 1870s, shortly after Nguyễn Trung Trực's execution by French colonial forces on October 27, 1868, at Rạch Giá Market. Local residents, admiring his leadership in uprisings such as the Nhật Tảo battle, secretly venerated him within an existing shrine to the whale spirit (Nam Hải Đại Tướng Quân). This initial structure was a simple wooden building with a thatched roof, built by fishermen near the Kiên River.

Repairs in 1881 expanded the site, and a major renovation from December 20, 1964, to February 24, 1970, shaped its modern form, funded entirely by community contributions and designed by architect Nguyễn Văn Lợi. In 1986, Nguyễn Trung Trực's tomb was constructed on the grounds, and a traditional medicine clinic opened in 1989, providing free services for over 30 years. The Ministry of Culture and Information designated it a national relic in 1988.

An exhibition room displays artifacts from Nguyễn Trung Trực's uprisings, and a bronze statue of him, originally from the local market and relocated in 2000, stands prominently.

== Architecture ==
The temple adopts a "tam" (三)-shaped layout, comprising the main hall (chánh điện), eastern wing (đông lang), and western wing (tây lang). The entrance features a three-gate structure (tam quan) with a tiled roof adorned by two dragons contesting a pearl. Couplets from poet Huỳnh Mẫn Đạt's work flank the gate.

The main hall has a curved tiled roof with dragon and chrysanthemum motifs, supported by columns with coiled dragon reliefs. Interior altars honor Nguyễn Trung Trực centrally, alongside figures like Nguyễn Hiền Điều and Lâm Quang Ky, as well as ancestral spirits and martyrs. The tomb, a rectangular cement structure with a stele inscribed "Anh hùng Nguyễn Trung Trực (1838-1868)", lies in the courtyard.

== Festival and cultural role ==
The annual festival, held on the 26th to 28th (sometimes extending to 29th) of the eighth lunar month, commemorates Nguyễn Trung Trực's sacrifice. Recognized as national intangible cultural heritage in 2023, it includes rituals, battle reenactments, folk games, martial arts, lion dances, and communal meals serving thousands with free vegetarian food. The event promotes ethnic harmony and attracts visitors from across Vietnam.

The temple also operates a free traditional medicine clinic and serves as a community hub, embodying rigorous preservation of historical memory.

== See also ==
- Tam Bảo Temple, a nearby temple
