= Giang Thành district =

Coordinates: 10°30′43″N 104°38′02″E

Giang Thành district Huyện Giang Thành
- District
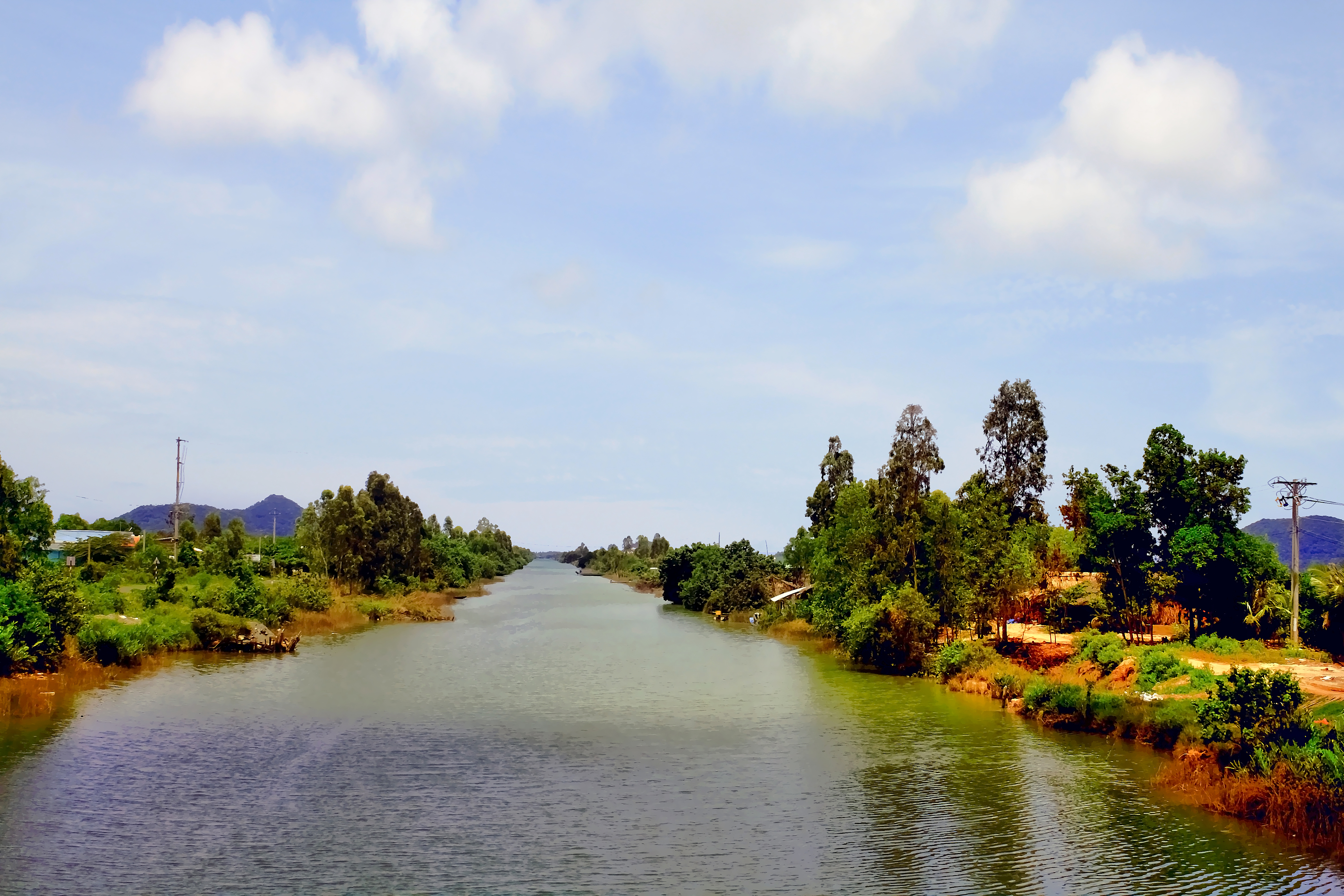
- View of Thoại Hà Canal
- Interactive map of Giang Thành district
- Country: Vietnam
- Region: Mekong Delta
- Province: Kiên Giang
- Capital: None

Area
  - Total: 157.315 sq mi (407.443 km^{2})

Population (2019)
  - Total: 34,860
- Time zone: UTC+7 (Indochina Time)

Giang Thành is a rural district of the Mekong Delta region of Vietnam. It was established in 2009 from 5 communes in northern Kiên Lương district. As of 2009 the district had a population of 28,910. The district covers an area of 407.443 km^{2}. The capital of the district is under construction.

== Communes ==
The district is divided into 5 communes:

- Phú Lợi
- Phú Mỹ
- Tân Khánh Hòa (considered as the district seat)
- Vĩnh Điều
- Vĩnh Phú
