= Sắc Tứ Tam Bảo Temple =

Buddhist temple in Vietnam

Sắc Tứ Tam Bảo Temple is an historic Buddhist temple in Rạch Giá, a town in Kiên Giang Province in the Mekong Delta region of southern Vietnam. It is one of two famous temples of the same name in Kiên Giang, the other being in Hà Tiên.

== History ==
The site of the temple was the location where a local lady by the name of Dương Thị Cán, also known Lady Hoặng, undertook her religious practices in the late 18th century. At the time Nguyễn Phúc Ánh, the nephew of the last of the Nguyễn lords, was the only surviving member of the family to escape from Saigon after his family had been killed in the uprising of the Tây Sơn dynasty. He went into hiding in the Mekong Delta in the late 1770s and 1780s, and Lady Hoặng was one of his benefactors. Later, he reunified Vietnam in 1802 for the first time in its modern state and proclaimed himself as Emperor Gia Long of the newly created Nguyễn dynasty. Gia Long had the temple built in honour of Lady Hoặng.

The temple is located at 6 Thích Thiện Ân Street in the town of Rạch Giá. The name sign of the temple is visible from Nguyễn Trung Trực Street. The main hall of the temple is built in the thượng lầu hạ hiên architecture style. There is also a three-storey stupa to the side of the temple. The main hall of the temple is 14.50 m wide and 22 m long. The statues of Amitabha Buddha, Gautama Buddha and various bodhisattvas adorn altars with gold paint.

The eastern sanctuary of the temple serves as a guest room and the office of the abbot. The western sanctuary is used as a dharma hall and also dispenses free medical treatment to local townsfolk.

The history of the temple is closely associated with the achievements of Thích Trí Thiền (1882–1943), who was responsible for the renovations in 1917 that brought the temple into its current state. He was also the founder of the Southern Association of Buddhist Research, which came into being in 1931. The office of the association is at Linh Son Temple in what is now Ho Chi Minh City. He then returned to Rạch Giá to form another Buddhist association for propagating dharma as well as social service.

After the 1916 Cochinchina uprising against French rule, the temple was taken over by local revolutionaries who used it as a cover to manufacture munitions for attacking the French army. When the operations were discovered by French police, Thích Trí Thiền took the blame to spare the revolutionaries and was sent to Côn Sơn island's prison for anti-colonials, where he died in 1943. Today, the temple is the headquarters of the board of the Provincial Buddhist Association of Kiên Giang. The temple was decreed to be a site of historical and cultural interest by the government of Vietnam on March 3, 1988.
