= Thoại Hà Canal =

Waterway in Vietnam

Thoại Hà Canal Kênh Thoại Hà
- Country: Vietnam

Specifications
- Length: 31.74 km (19.72 miles)
- Lock width: 51.2 m (168 ft)

History
- Principal engineer: Thoại Ngọc Hầu
- Construction began: 1818
- Date completed: 1818

Geography
- Start point: Hậu River in Long Xuyên, An Giang province
- End point: Rạch Giá Bay, Rạch Giá, Kiên Giang province

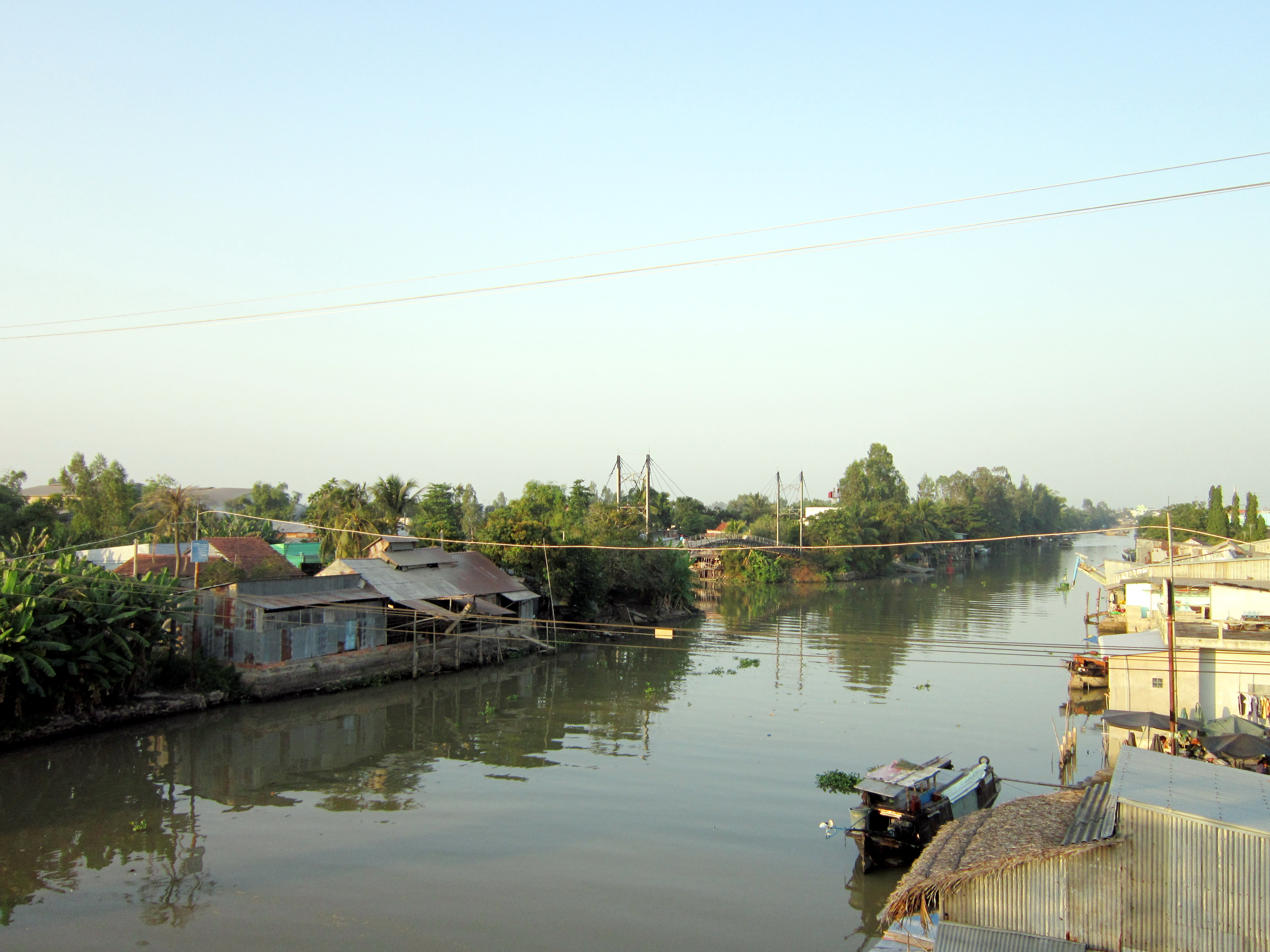
Picture of the canal

The Thoại Hà Canal (Vietnamese: Kênh Thoại Hà) is a canal of southwestern Vietnam. It flows through An Giang Province and Kiên Giang Province.
