= Trương Định =

19th-century mandarin (scholar-official) in Nguyễn-dynasty Vietnam

Trương Định 張 定
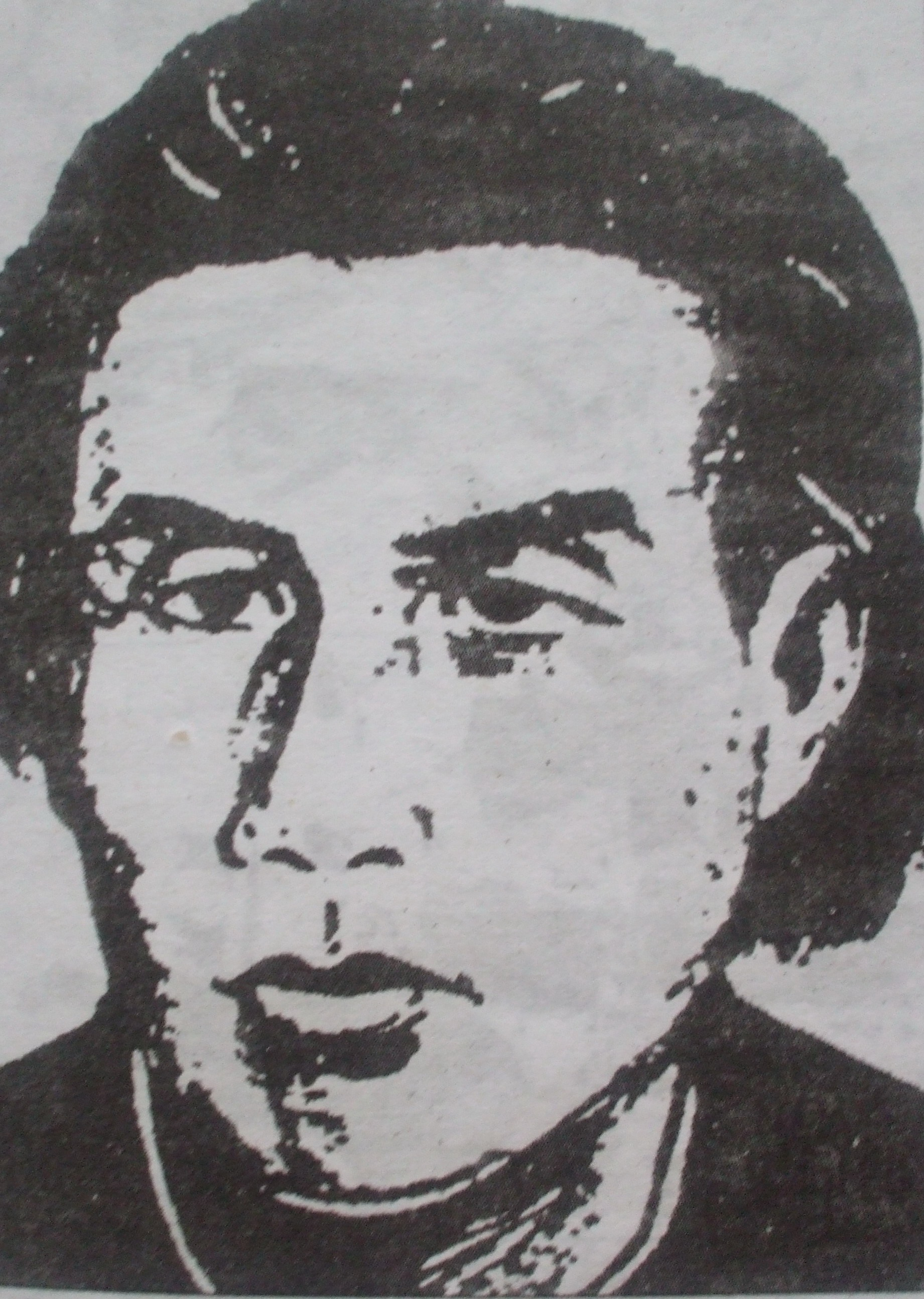
- Portrait of Truong Dinh, by a later 19th century anonymous artist
- Born: 1820; Bình Sơn, Quảng Ngãi, Vietnam
- Died: 19 August 1864 (aged 43–44); Biên Hòa, Cochinchina
- Other name: Trương Công Định
- Organization: Nguyễn dynasty

Notes
- Refused an appointment to a mandarin post in An Giang

Trương Định (1820 – 19 August 1864), sometimes known as Trương Công Định, was a mandarin (scholar-official) in the Nguyễn dynasty of Vietnam under Emperor Tự Đức. He is best known for leading a guerrilla army in southern Vietnam against French forces in defiance of the emperor. He refused to recognise the 1862 Treaty of Saigon that ceded Vietnamese territory to France.

The son of a military mandarin from central Vietnam, Định moved south when his father was posted to Gia Định as the provincial commander. Định grew up to lead a military colony, overseeing the settlement and economic development of his constituency. He gained a reputation for being an able leader and land developer who cared for his people. When France began its invasion of southern Vietnam in 1859, Định organised local militia to reinforce the imperial army. As the regular army units suffered defeats on the battlefield, its remnants joined Định's partisans, and by 1861, he had around 6,000 men under his command. Định built his own resistance base and organised guerrilla attacks against the French. His success led Tự Đức to grant Định command of the southern partisans and to order the regular commanders to coordinate their plans with him. Định's forces quickly gained the respect of the French. They focused on disrupting the French bureaucracy and military posts in addition to the transportation of rice. Their most notable attack was the sinking of L'Espérance in December 1861.

Amid growing military setbacks, Vietnam signed the Treaty of Saigon in June 1862, losing three southern provinces which became the French colony of Cochinchina. Tự Đức hoped that by abiding by the treaty, Vietnam could eventually negotiate the future return of the territory. He ordered the partisans to disband, but Định refused to recognise the treaty and disobeyed the monarch, fighting on in defense of his homeland. With the loss of imperial support, Định's forces began to struggle against the superior resources of the French. His men were gradually worn down and, following an ambush, Định committed suicide to avoid being captured.

Vietnamese and French historians have fiercely debated Định's choice to disregard the treaty. The effectiveness of Định's insurgency led French officials to claim that Tự Đức was secretly assisting him, thereby violating the treaty, a pretext the French used to seize three more provinces in 1867. Vietnamese records dispute this, contending that Tự Đức attempted to ensure Định's compliance with the treaty. Định's defiance of the emperor has led historians to debate whether his actions were motivated by a rejection of the monarch's authority or whether he disobeyed in an attempt to help Tự Đức. Định remains widely respected among Vietnamese of all political persuasions. During the Vietnam War, communist historians sought to portray the Việt Cộng as Định's modern successor.

== Early years ==
Định was born in the Bình Sơn District in the Quảng Ngãi prefecture in Quảng Nam Province in central Vietnam. The son of a military mandarin named Trương Cầm, Định went south in the 1830s when his father was posted to Gia Định as the provincial commander. Định enjoyed a reputation among the locals for his martial skills and knowledge of the military classics. He married the daughter of a wealthy resident of Tân An in nearby Dinh Tuong Province, having moved there after his father's unexpected death. It was likely that he would have returned to central Vietnam if he had not married.

Định took advantage of his improved socio-economic status to recruit a group of impoverished people, whom he organised for clearing land and founding a đồn điền ("military colony") in Gò Công. This occurred after Emperor Tự Đức's 1854 order, which granted General Nguyễn Tri Phương permission to organise southern levies in this manner. In recognition of his achievements, the mandarin authorities gave Định the rank of deputy regimental commander. His success in developing đồn điền was attributed to his organisational ability as well as a genuine concern for the welfare of those under his protection, ensuring that they had enough to eat and something to wear. He was regarded as energetic, brave and compassionate. In gratitude for Định's land development skills, the peasants gave him the middle name Công, which means "great public service".

== French invasion in 1859 ==
The process of Vietnam's colonisation began in September 1858 when a Franco-Spanish force landed at Da Nang in central Vietnam and attempted to proceed to the capital, Huế. After becoming tied down, they sailed to the less-defended south. The French and Spanish quickly captured the imperial Citadel of Saigon in February 1859—the fortress's commander committed suicide. The citadel was razed and the substantial supplies were confiscated. The leaderless and defeated imperial troops fled in disarray. The attacks were ordered by French Emperor Napoleon III. French diplomats, naval officers, merchants and missionaries had long advocated the expedition. The missionaries wanted the French administration to facilitate their work converting the Vietnamese to Roman Catholicism, while military and business figures saw strategic and commercial opportunities in Vietnam. Napoleon's motivations were primarily imperial, strategic and commercial, but he found it convenient to cite "freedom of religion" as his justification for taking action. The Nguyễn Dynasty was Confucianist and had restricted the activity of missionaries. The belief system of Christianity was incompatible with the Confucian belief that the monarch was the "son of heaven".

In response to the razing of the Citadel of Saigon, Định organized his local levies into a guerrilla force that initially numbered between 500 and 1,000 men, operating out of Thuan Kieu. They were armed with bladed spears, bow and arrows, fire lances, knives, machetes, sabres, swords, and a small amount of firearms, who were trained and ready at whatsoever moment. As a renowned local leader who was respected for his leadership and military prowess, Định naturally assumed a lead role in the partisan movement that responded to Tự Đức's appeals for popular resistance against the French aggression. In the initial phase of the conflict, the local militias concentrated on evacuating the populace from areas that had been taken over by the French, while urging those who chose to stay to not cooperate with them. Snipers were deployed into French areas to assassinate isolated soldiers.

In 1861, Định moved his men to Tân Hòa sub-prefecture in the Gò Công area. Tan Hoa was an ideal location for a resistance base. It was close to newly formed resistance groups led by Nguyễn Trung Trực, Tran Xuan Hoa and others in the Gò Công and Mỹ Tho area, yet was also close to Saigon. In February of that year, the French besieged the citadel of Ky Hoa, quickly seizing the fort due to their advanced weaponry, along capturing a large quantity of the citadel weapons, artillery and food supplies. Having fought at Ky Hoa, Định knew he needed more fighters to at least have a fighting chance against the French's, so he decided to incorporate any soldier who wanted to protect their homeland, from the defeated Southern Army into his ranks. Who many have been astray after their commander of the fallen Saigon Citadel in 1859, Governor General of Gia Dinh and Bien Hoa Võ Duy Ninh committed suicide after their defeat. In May 1861, Admiral Léonard Charner ordered the dissolution of the đồn điền of Gò Công. He went about confiscating the land of those Vietnamese who remained loyal to the monarchy, giving it to his collaborators. French impositions against the trade of rice via nearby waterways caused a further backlash from the locals of Gò Công. In 1861, the resistance leaders in the Gò Công area delegated Định to travel to Biên Hòa to seek permission from Imperial Military Commissioner Nguyen Ba Nghi to "turn around the situation".

Appointed to the rank of lieutenant colonel, Định began to stockpile foodstuffs, manufacture weapons, and recruit forces from the populace with the help of officers from the imperial army. His forces grew to around 6,000 men by June 1861. The French began to report that junks from Singapore and Hong Kong had arrived in Gò Công with shipments of European-made weapons. Định's forces began inflicting substantial damage on the European troops, largely because of their intimate knowledge of the terrain, skill in hit-and-run guerrilla tactics, and popular support from the local villagers. Định's men focused on targeting French soldiers stationed around the countryside and ambushing military installations that weren’t well concentrated as a consequence of their guerrilla pursuit. Learning of Định's role in support of the Nguyễn dynasty's call for popular resistance, Tự Đức promoted him to the rank of lieutenant colonel for the Gia Định region. Later in 1861, the imperial regulars were defeated at Biên Hòa, and the commanding Vietnamese officers were ordered by the royal authorities to meet Định at Tan Hoa to develop a plan for retaking Biên Hòa. As a result, the number of troops under Định's direct authority grew. Early in 1862, the Nguyễn court granted Định command of all the southern nghĩa quân (righteous soldiers), the term that Huế used for the partisans. Định continued to lead raids on enemy forces from his base in Gò Công. Friction developed between the regular army and Định's partisans as to whether to stage aggressive sorties from Tan Hoa, as was Định's strategy, or to bide their time and engage in military buildup.

Định's nghĩa quân quickly earned the respect of the opposing French naval officers. Léopold Pallu de la Barrière, who defended the posts at Gò Công from Định's attacks, was surprised by their ferocity. Unaware of their nationalist feelings, de la Barrière had expected the Vietnamese to live submissively under any ruler that would allow them to sow their crops. He wrote:

The attack on Gò Công by a group of armed, skillfully led men surprised everyone. We thought that the Annamites were still submerged in fear, that the masses were enslaved, cowardly, the dregs of empire ... incapable of any act of resistance.

He went on to recognise the popular nature of the partisans' efforts, stating that the "centre of resistance was everywhere, infinitely subdivided"; he regarded every peasant as a centre of resistance.

== Notable attacks ==
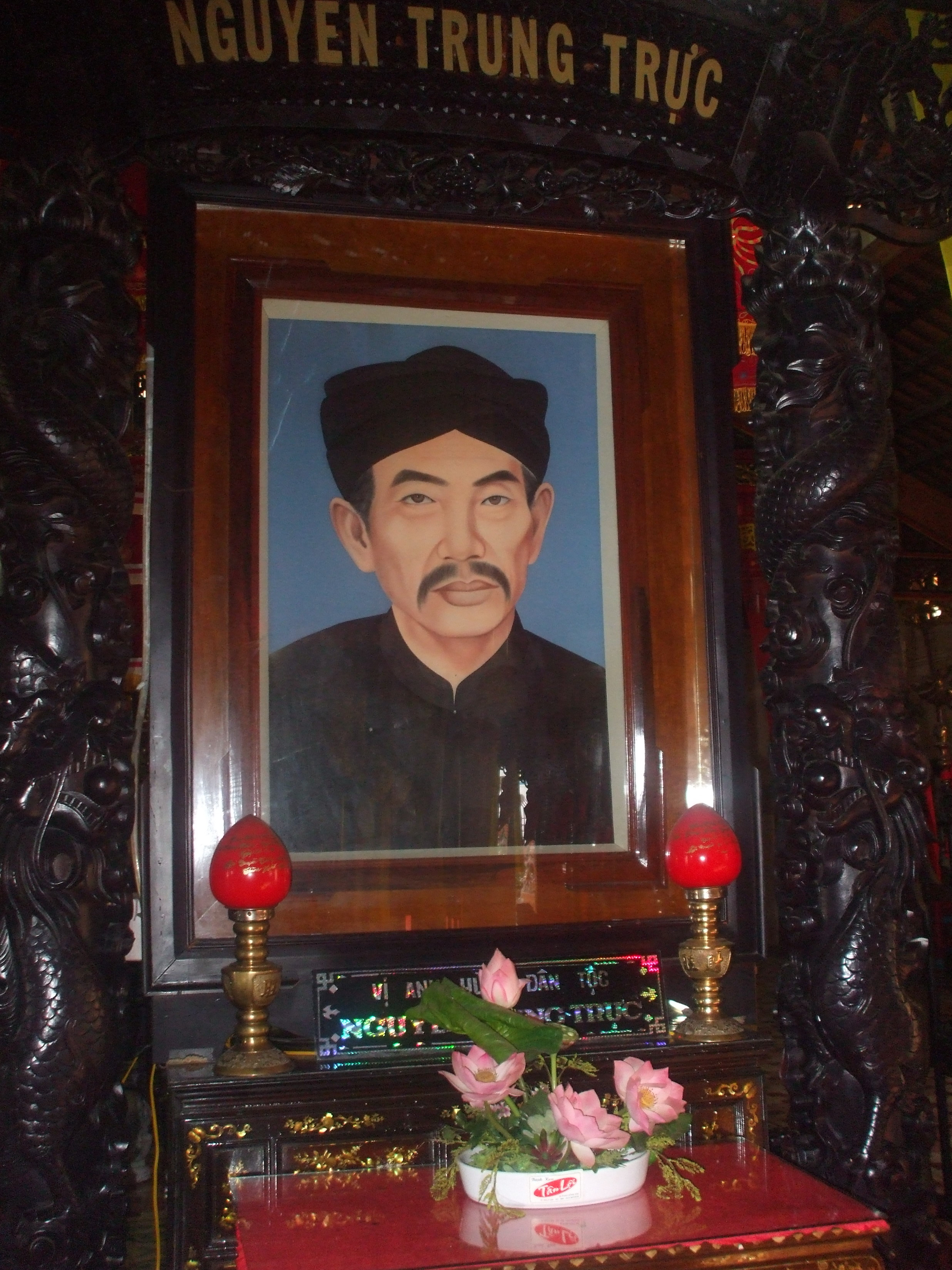
Nguyễn Trung Trực, another leader in the resistance movement

From the middle of 1861, Định's Gò Công guerrillas focused on three objectives: to disrupt the newly created French bureaucracy, to disrupt their military outposts and to disrupt the transport of rice to Cholon, the main commercial hub of southern Vietnam. The first major attack against the French administration in the area targeted the Gò Công district office on 22 June 1861. At 05:00, 600 rebels under the command of Do Dinh Thoai stormed the military post in the town, engaging the French troops in hand-to-hand combat with lances, bayonets, knives and bamboo sticks. The French were surprised by the attack, losing one soldier and having 100 wounded. By the time reinforcements and naval cover had arrived from Mỹ Tho, Định's men had fled. Thoai—who had been the district chief until the French invasion—was among the 14 killed.

On 27 September, the guerrillas assassinated the French-installed chief of Gò Công, displaying his severed head in the town market. The chief's servant, who was an informant for Định, aided this operation. The killing had the effect of intimidating the chief's designated successor into submitting to the rebels and ceasing his service for the French. In November 1861, Định's men went into the town of Mỹ Tho to recruit militants and collect food supplies. During this time, they attacked and burned pro-French villages and their leaders.

Định's Gò Công insurgents attempted to stop rice from being shipped to Cholon by attacking the French lorchas and apprehending the trading vessels on the local waterways. A French report in November 1861 noted that shipping had been severely disrupted and restricted, despite high levels of French naval protection.

The most notable of the seaborne attacks was the burning of the French Navy lorcha L'Espérance on Nhat Tao Canal on 10 December 1861. Around 150 guerrillas commanded by Nguyễn Trung Trực ambushed the vessel, killing all but 3 of the crew before burning and sinking the boat. The attack buoyed Vietnamese morale and instilled confidence among the freedom fighters that they could fight against French naval forces. The sinking earned the specific praise of Emperor Tự Đức, who described the incident as "most outstanding".

== Continued guerrilla campaign ==
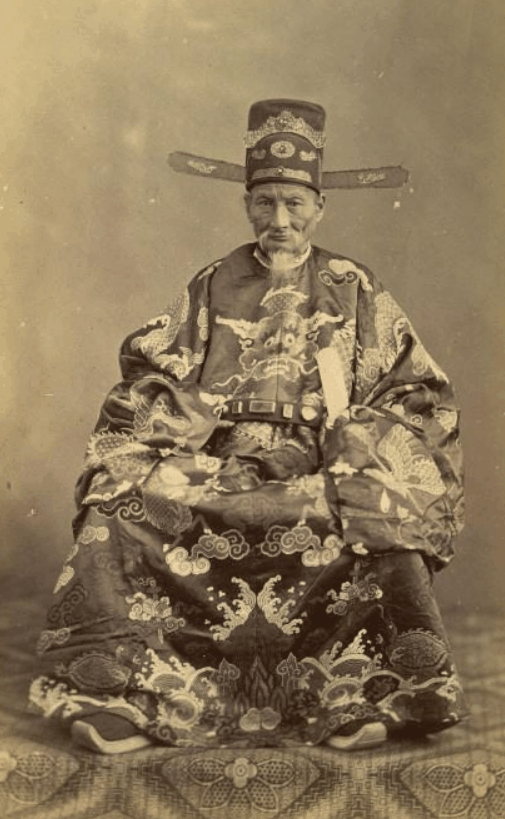
Phan Thanh Giản

However, the overall Vietnamese military performance was not as successful as Định's guerrilla activities. On 5 June 1862, Định broke with the Nguyễn army after the court's plenipotentiary Phan Thanh Giản and another official, Lam Duy Hiep, signed the Treaty of Saigon. This agreement ceded the three southern provinces of Gia Định, Định Tường and Biên Hòa to France; they became the colony of Cochinchina. The treaty was accompanied by financial payments to France, religious concessions to missionaries and commercial opportunities for European merchants. Militarily, the withdrawal of the Nguyễn army deprived the resistance of the logistical support that could be provided by a regular force. It also permitted the French to concentrate their efforts against a single antagonist. Politically, the treaty provided, for those Vietnamese who needed one, a legal basis to collaborate with the French on Cochinchinese soil. As a result, the colonial forces found it easier to recruit militia and administrative personnel among Vietnamese who had been too afraid or too embarrassed to serve the French openly before the 1862 treaty. Định then allied himself with Võ Duy Dương to form the Movement of Popular Self Defense (Phong Trao Nhan Dan Tu Ve), creating an operations base in Đồng Tháp.

The Huế court ordered Định to disband his forces and to accept a high position in An Giang Province. Fearing that they faced extermination at the hands of the French, Định's followers and lieutenants pressed him to remain. Claiming that his followers would not allow him to leave, Định refused his appointment to An Giang, instead adopting the title of Bình Tây Sát Tà Đại Tướng (Western Pacifying Antiheresy General). He continued his guerrilla attacks against French patrols and their Vietnamese collaborators. The slogan "Phan-Lâm mái quốc; Triều đình khi dân" (Phan [Thanh Gian] and Lam [Duy Hiep] sell out the country; the court doesn’t care for the people) was circulated through the region. From his stronghold at Gò Công, Định exhorted all southern Vietnamese to rise against the occupying regime, an appeal that was well received. In the words of French naval artillery officer Henri de Poyen, by December 1862, "the insurrection had broken out and was rapidly spreading throughout the colony". French commanders were convinced that Định remained in secret contact with Huế and was privately supported by Tự Đức against the terms of the treaty. The French charged that Định possessed a seal of office from Huế. However, there were reports that Tự Đức had twice ordered the arrest of Định and Dương to ensure their compliance with the treaty.

In contrast with many of his scholar-gentry colleagues who lacked a military training, Định was regarded as having a good understanding of the capabilities and limitations of his armed resistance. Định hoped to wear down the French over an extended period by exploiting the constant outbreak of malaria among the Europeans. During the initial phase of the invasion in 1858, the French had suffered heavily from tropical disease. Định calculated that such illnesses would partly compensate for the inferior weaponry of his forces. He attempted to maintain an administration parallel to the one imposed on the districts by the French admirals. These objectives required a high degree of regional coordination, something that was impossible without the support of the imperial bureaucracy. Định's appeal among the peasantry was attributed to their gratitude for his administration of the đồn điền. Under such a system, he was responsible for assisting them in matters such as clearing land, educating the community, providing health care and mediating disputes. Joining the resistance army was seen as a means of showing trust and gratitude. Hịch Trương Định (The proclamation of Trương Định), which was believed to have been written in 1862 or 1863, emphasised such themes. It read:

To all those who can see and hear!
Look at the animals,
The water buffaloes and the horses are deaf and dumb,
But they are grateful to their masters;
The chickens and the dogs only know how to crow and bark,
But they are kind to their masters.
And we who have our feet on the ground, our head under the sky should we harm our people and country!

— Trương Định, Hịch Trương Định (The proclamation of Trương Định)

== Death ==
By February 1864, Admiral Bonard had accumulated sufficient reinforcements to attack and seize Định's main strongholds in the Tan Hoa and Gò Công areas. He inflicted heavy casualties on the partisans and forced them to retreat in disarray. Định reorganised his troops and procured more firearms from the local Chinese in order to resume his guerrilla campaign. He attempted to widen his support base by distributing leaflets as far as the regional centres of Saigon and Mỹ Tho, calling on nghĩa quân from other provinces to join the common struggle. By this time, the French were able to keep Định and the other resistance leaders constantly on the move, aided by a growing network of local informants. In 1863, a famine had broken out, and resistance forces were increasingly unable to find food. With the court providing no practical support, the French gradually wore down the partisans. Định retreated into the marshes of Bien Hoa, where he attempted to reorganise his forces.

On 19 August 1864, with his remaining guerrillas facing serious supply problems and suffering from hunger, Định was betrayed by a former follower Huỳnh Tấn and ambushed by French forces. Wounded and facing imminent capture, Định used his sword to take his own life. His 20-year-old son Truong Quyen (1840–1870), attempted with modest success to carry on his father's struggle. A new base was set up in Tây Ninh. It allowed more room for tactical manoeuvring but still depended on supplies being carried north from Tan Hoa. Quyen was eventually killed and in 1874, long after the southern insurgency had been crushed, Tự Đức granted a monthly allowance in grain and cash to Định's widow Le Thi Thuong, who had returned to her native village in Quảng Ngãi, which at the time was still in independent Vietnamese territory. The ration of 20 francs and 60 litres of rice was substantial, because the monthly salary of a ninth-rank mandarin was only 18 francs and 48 litres of rice.

== Debate on Defiance of Huế ==
The actions of Định in the wake of the Treaty of Saigon have long been a subject of conjecture. At the time, the French military accused Huế of surreptitiously supporting Định in contravention of the treaty, while Huế denied this, publicly claiming that Định's actions in resisting the French would be counterproductive in attempting to maintain Vietnamese sovereignty.

After the signing of the Treaty of Saigon, the Huế court attempted to regain what it had lost militarily through diplomacy. Vietnamese negotiators sought a reversal of the territorial cession, which they regarded as the most humiliating clause of the treaty. In late 1863, the Vietnamese proposed extensive financial, economic, and political concessions in exchange for the return of the three provinces. Tự Đức sent Gian to France to seek an audience with Napoleon III. There Gian behaved in a helpless manner in an attempt to gain pity from the French monarch. Gian promised that Vietnam would pay large indemnities for the military conflicts, grant further commercial concessions and a protectorate over all six southern provinces. Napoleon initially agreed, but the decision was reversed after lobbying from French officers.

Tự Đức continued to hope that Vietnamese compliance with the treaty would convince France to return the three southern provinces. In the words of Gian, Vietnam's full cooperation with the 1862 treaty was necessary to maintain the possibility of a territorial retrocession. The French officers in Saigon, the capital of Cochinchina, frequently accused the Nguyễn court of violating the treaty by quietly supporting continued resistance. In 1867, they took this as a pretext to seize the other three provinces in southern Vietnam: Vĩnh Long, Hà Tiên and An Giang.

The court records of the Nguyễn dynasty in Huế, the Đại Nam thực lục (Veritable Records of the Great South) dispute the French claims, revealing that the court attempted to prevent illegal guerrilla activity by the likes of Định. However, in one edict, Định claimed that Tự Đức endorsed his struggle, in an attempt to garner popular support. This fuelled French claims that the guerrillas were periodically traveling between French territory and the adjoining sovereign Nguyễn territory to get supplies from provincial officials.

The French officers never produced concrete proof of Huế's support for the southern partisans or of the connivance of Vietnamese officials in the sovereign provinces bordering French-occupied territory. Despite this, they seized the rest of southern Vietnam on the basis that Huế was violating the treaty. Vice-Admiral Bonard, governor of French Cochinchina from 1861 until 1863, asserted:

There is no disguising the fact that the peace stipulated by the Treaty [of 1862] has never been faithfully executed by the Huế court. Seeing that it could not withstand a conventional war, the Annamite government organised, openly before the peace, clandestinely and underhandedly afterward, a permanent insurrection in Cochin China.... Quan Dinh [Mandarin Dinh], head of the insurrection at Gò Công, although publicly disavowed by the viceroy of Vĩnh Long Phan Thanh Gian, who has called on him several times to withdraw so that the peace treaty can be implemented, has absolutely refused to do so. He is thus apparently in a state of rebellion, but the Huế government, which has publicly given him orders that he has disobeyed, supports him clandestinely and supplies him with arms, munitions, and seals.

Historians sympathetic to the colonisation reiterated the officers' assertions about the contacts between Huế and the southern partisans. De Poyen wrote that the southern insurgency "was ceaselessly excited and supported by emissaries from Huế, who travelled throughout the country". Milton Osborne, while noting that evidence was circumstantial, asserted that French charges were probably legitimate:

The scale of the risings in December 1862 certainly suggests an organised concerted effort, backed by Huế. This judgment, however, is based on inference, not on certain fact. After the failure of the 1862 risings, Huế had little active part in the repeated risings in the South.... Noninvolvement in practical ways did not mean the end of interest, and there seems some reason to accept the French allegations that the sporadic risings against their control of Cochinchina received the clandestine approval of Huế for many years.

Vietnamese documentation challenges the French assertions. The imperial records, written communications between Gian and Định, and the account of the southern insurgency written by a resistance figure named Nguyen Thong support the contention that Định's guerrillas operated independently of Huế and in violation of its orders. The imperial records hold that Tự Đức immediately ordered the insurgents to disband, fearing that their actions were an obstacle to his plan of negotiating the return of the lost territory. The records assert that Tự Đức ordered his officials to prevent the insurgents from returning to independent Vietnamese land and to arrest those who did so. Messengers were sent from Huế into the south with the intention of discouraging the insurgents, rather than fomenting resistance.

In the specific case of Định, the Vietnamese documents record the failed attempts of Gian to persuade him to lay down his arms and accept an administrative post in An Giang. The records assert that his position as head of the resistance was granted by his followers rather than Huế. Shortly after signing the treaty, the court directed Gian to write to Định, ordering him to respect the agreement and end his resistance. Gian's letter and Định's rebuff show Tự Đức's insistence on abiding by the treaty and the guerrilla chief's staunch refusal to do so. Gian's letter argued that it was illegal and futile to ignore the court's order to cease hostilities. Gian wrote:

Since the court has signed the peace treaty, you should cease hostilities and not violate the king's orders.... At present, the court's regular forces have all been withdrawn, and the mandarins commanding troops hiding in the mountains and forests have all disbanded their forces. If you alone are to lead your soldiers to the attack, can you be certain of victory? If you retreat, can you defend yourself? Certainly not!

In his reply, Định demonstrated his awareness of the illegality of his insurgency and the southerners' obligation to obey their emperor. Định nevertheless refused to abandon his supporters, vowing to disobey royal orders:

The people of the three provinces, wanting to return to their former status, designated me as their leader. Therefore, we cannot take any course but our present one.... If Your Excellency still maintains that the agreements with the invaders must be preserved, then we will oppose the court's commands, and ... there can be no more peace or truce between us and Your Excellency.

Vietnamese records show that when Định disobeyed the court's orders, he was stripped of his position and titles: "Trương Định has refused to return to the exercise of his office, and he is accordingly removed from that function with loss of honorific titles." Nguyen Thong, a former mandarin who fought alongside Định and corresponded with many other guerrilla leaders, agreed with the court records. According to Thong, Định's continued resistance resulted from local initiatives contrary to Huế's explicit instructions. Định's supporters implored him to disobey the edicts of 1862 that directed the partisans to end hostilities: "Our people forced the Westerners to retreat many times, and now that the court has made peace with them, they will surely kill us.... Since the court has settled with them, who will support us? Let us unite to strike back at them, to take for ourselves a piece of land on which we can fight for our lives."

According to Thong's account, Định agreed with these arguments and began to organise the resources required for his unapproved anti-French movement. Although he was fully aware of his imperial defiance, Định sent an appeal "to all the righteous men, encouraging them in the name of loyalty to the court to rise and destroy the invaders". Thong asserted that the imperial edicts used by Định—which were cited by French officers for subsequent aggression—were fake. Định had falsified them to make propaganda in order to rally popular support. According to Mark McLeod, it is unclear whether hawkish mandarins in the imperial court were assisting Định's southern insurgents in contravention of Tự Đức's wishes. Truong Buu Lam opined that "if some partisans received assistance from the Vietnamese authorities, it was extended to them by local officials who acted independently".

== Debate on Disrespect of the mandate of heaven ==
In light of Định's disobedience of Tự Đức, his justification for his defiance is discussed against the backdrop of the Confucian expectation for him to defer to the emperor's "Mandate of Heaven". As Định left no explicit or definitive statement for his rationale for disobeying Tự Đức, scholars who have recognised or suspected Định's disobedience have been forced to speculate.

Lam assumes Định's disobedience and explains it by asserting that the insurgents drew a distinction between the reigning monarch and the monarchy as an idealised institution.

After the Huế court signed the Treaty of Saigon, a moral dilemma developed since the partisans could neither accept the loss of their country nor claim that their cause was righteous if they acted in violation of the court's orders. They therefore drew a careful distinction between the person of an individual king and the moral principle of loyalty to the monarchy.... The monarchy was therefore an idealised institution not tarnished by any accidental deviation from the ideal.

The historian David Marr agrees, noting that "the distinction quite rightly pointed out by Professor Truong Buu Lam was in all probability bred of immediate adverse conditions and not the product of a long tradition". Modern Vietnamese historians of the communist regime go to the extent of asserting that Định's justification for continued resistance was based on an implicit rejection of the monarchy at large. These historians base their hypothesis on the assertion that the Confucian virtue of monarchical loyalty was unconditional and absolute in 19th-century Vietnam. In the words of the editors of the Institute of Historical Study's journal, Nghiên cứu lịch sử (Historical Studies), "Loyalty to the king was the people's duty, and to satisfy the obligation of monarchical loyalty, the court's orders had to be followed". In the view of Marxist authors, Định resolved the conflict between monarchical loyalty and resisting foreign occupation by discarding the constraints of Confucian ethics. They assert that Định justified his struggle by placing loyalty to Tự Đức below his loyalty to Vietnam and its people. The Institute of Historical Study's Nguyen Cong Binh stated, "Relying on the people, Trương Định placed the country above the king, thus safeguarding his feelings of loyalty to the country". These arguments are consistent with Marxist ideology and its criticism of the Nguyễn dynasty as a "reactionary, feudal regime". Communist party historiography has long criticised the Nguyễn dynasty and its roots in the Nguyễn lords for the division of the country in the centuries-long struggle with the Trịnh lords of the north and then the subsequent use of French aid of Pigneau de Behaine to unseat the Tây Sơn dynasty. It further accords with Hanoi's ideological line of portraying anti-colonial, anti-French fighters of the 19th century as the spiritual ancestors of the Vietnamese Communist Party.

According to historian Mark McLeod, these postulated explanations of Định's behaviour are plausible, given the chaos engulfing Vietnam at the time and the lack of conclusive documentation. However, Định and his supporters asserted their loyalty to the monarch and justified their struggle in his name, both before and after the signing of the treaty. These declarations show no hint of rejecting Tự Đức's authority nor any reference to a worthier, idealised monarch. Conversely, many of these proclamations display an intense feeling of personal loyalty. A placard that French forces found floating downstream near Định's base in Gò Công asserted: "Gratitude ties us to our king. We will avenge the insults he has received [from the French], or we will die for him." One of Định's proclamations to his followers read: "The Emperor does not recognise us, but it is indeed our duty to carry on our struggle.... The Emperor calls us rebels, but in the depth of his heart he cannot help but praise our loyalty. When the day of victory arrives, not only will the Emperor forgive us, he will furthermore grant us all kinds of awards."

Such writings may be dismissed by skeptics as a political stunt aimed at attracting support for continued resistance by appealing to the widely held Confucian value of monarchical loyalty. This is the explanation suggested by the Marxist authors: "On the one hand, Trương Định opposed Tự Đức's order to lay down his arms; on the other hand, he exploited Tự Đức's name in order to call upon the people to rise and fight the French". McLeod argues that the best explanation for Định's continued insurgency was that the Confucian tradition allows for a loyal official to disobey his sovereign without calling the sovereign's authority into question. This is termed a tránh thần, meaning a minister who is willing to dispute his sovereign's orders in order to prevent the ruler from committing a mistake, even if this incurred his ire. The minister who allowed the ruler to err rather than risk upsetting him was regarded as a sycophant, a careerist rather a loyal adviser. The loyal official was thus required in certain circumstances to remonstrate with and even to disobey his sovereign to show his concern for the monarch. Thus, according to McLeod, Định's disobedience did not ipso facto constitute a rejection of Tự Đức's authority.

Định believed that Tự Đức would eventually realise his error and reward the insurgents. Historians feel that it is likely that Gian and Tự Đức saw Định's continued resistance as a misguided attempt to help the monarchy. In their written confrontation after the signing of the treaty, Gian did not accuse Định of being a rebel, but of excessive devotion to the emperor, which while admirable in principle, was hindering their current strategy. "Monarchical loyalty is a noble quality", Gian had told the recalcitrant guerrilla leader, but "[i]t must have a limit. One cannot exceed this limit and still be faithful and pious. Too much is just as bad as not enough; when a snake begins to have legs, it is no longer a snake..." Tự Đức also appeared to view Định's continued resistance as a misguided manifestation of loyalty. Although the southern insurgents' disobedience provided the French with a pretext for further aggression, thereby hindering Tự Đức's plans for regaining the lost territory, the emperor never accused them of rebelling against royal authority. Instead, he continued to refer to them as "righteous recruits" motivated by "indignation" at the actions of the Westerners.

Nguyễn Đình Chiểu, the leading poet of the southern struggle, did not portray Định as a rebel opposed to the Huế court. In an elegy to fallen insurgents, Chiểu asserted that the resistance continued its struggle after the treaty was signed "because their hearts would not heed the Son of Heaven's edict". Chiểu strongly supported the partisans' continuing efforts in attempting to expel the French from southern Vietnam, a cause he considered righteous. However, his reference to Tự Đức as the "Son of Heaven" indicates that the legitimacy of the emperor was not called into question. After Định's death, Chiểu wrote in a poem:

You have spared no efforts to help your country,
Although you disobeyed the royal orders, you shall not be considered a disloyal subject.

Chiểu further hoped that the Vietnamese court would change its position and come to the aid of the insurgents, writing: "The sigh of the wind and the cry of the crane [announcing the official army's arrival] held you breathless for more than ten months. You were expecting news from the officials as one expects rain in the dry season."

== Legacy ==
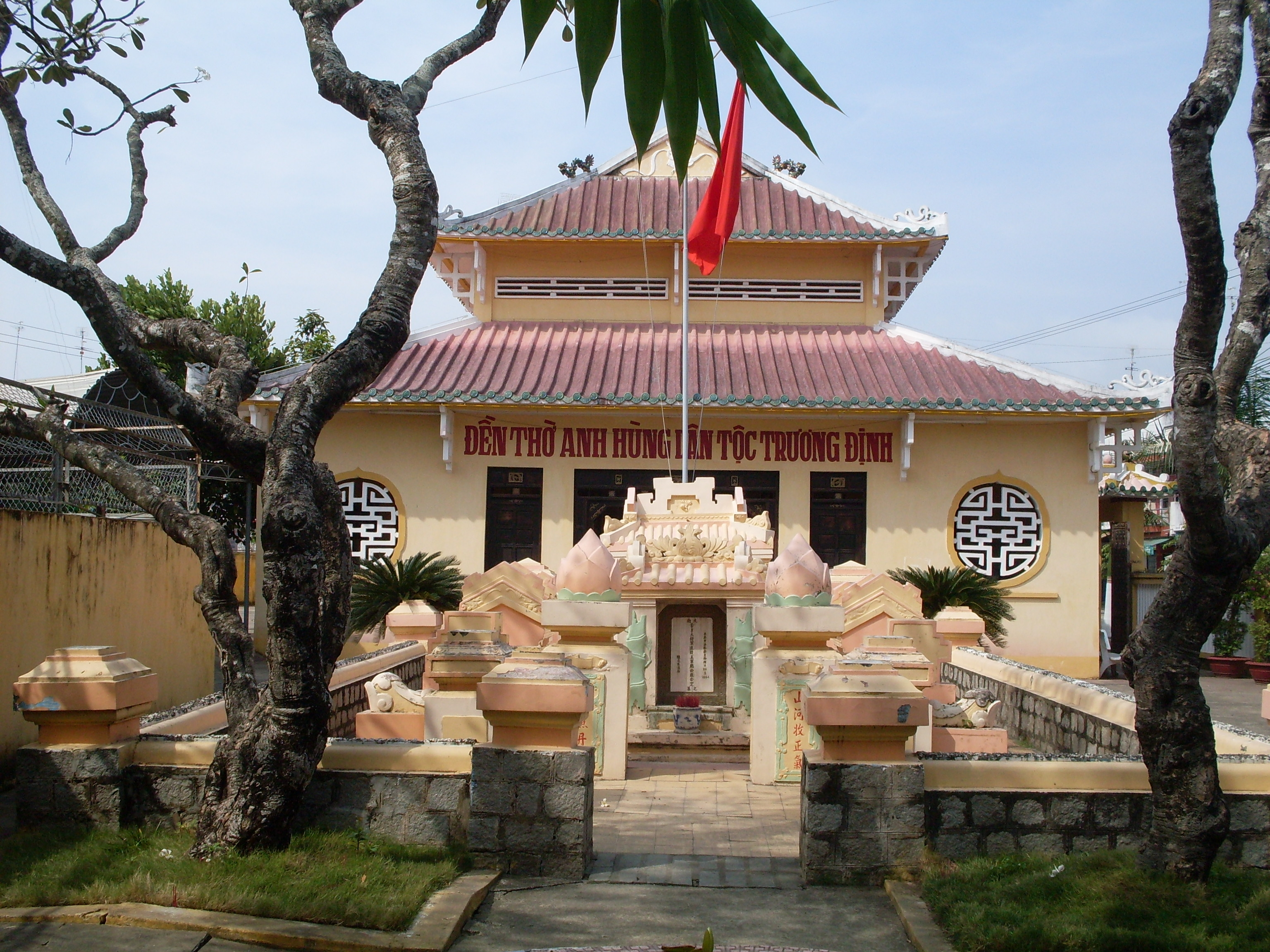
Tomb of Trương Định in Gò Công, Tiền Giang, Vietnam

The reputation of Định and his southern rebels persisted long after his death. Phan Bội Châu, the leading Vietnamese revolutionary of the early 20th century, travelled into the south in 1904, seeking to start a new anti-French movement. He specifically attempted to recruit followers among the surviving elderly members of Định's movement. Định was highly regarded as a revolutionary hero by Vietnamese of both communist and anti-communist persuasions. In 1964, an article in the North Vietnamese Nghiên cứu lịch sửu described Định as "the hero symbolising the spirit of resistance to the foreign colonialists of the people of Southern Viet-Nam". The same article extolled Định's physical appearance and his capabilities, stating "He was handsome in appearance, understood the military manual and was a good shot". During the Vietnam War era, North Vietnamese historians sought to portray the Viet Cong—which fought against the Army of the Republic of Vietnam and the United States—as Định's modern successor. Định was also highly regarded among anti-communist South Vietnamese scholars. A prominent thoroughfare in the centre of Ho Chi Minh City in southern Vietnam is named after him.

Although Định received little attention in French academia, the North Vietnamese heavily relied on French sources for their accounts of the guerrilla leader. In the most detailed French account by Paulin Vial, Định is depicted as a "criminal" or "rebel". Osborne said that Định's final manifesto before his death showed him "to have been a man with a high concept of duty, an awareness of his own weakness and with a sense of despair, common to many of his countrymen, at the ambivalence of the Huế court".
