= Tam Bảo Temple =

- Chùa Tam Bảo
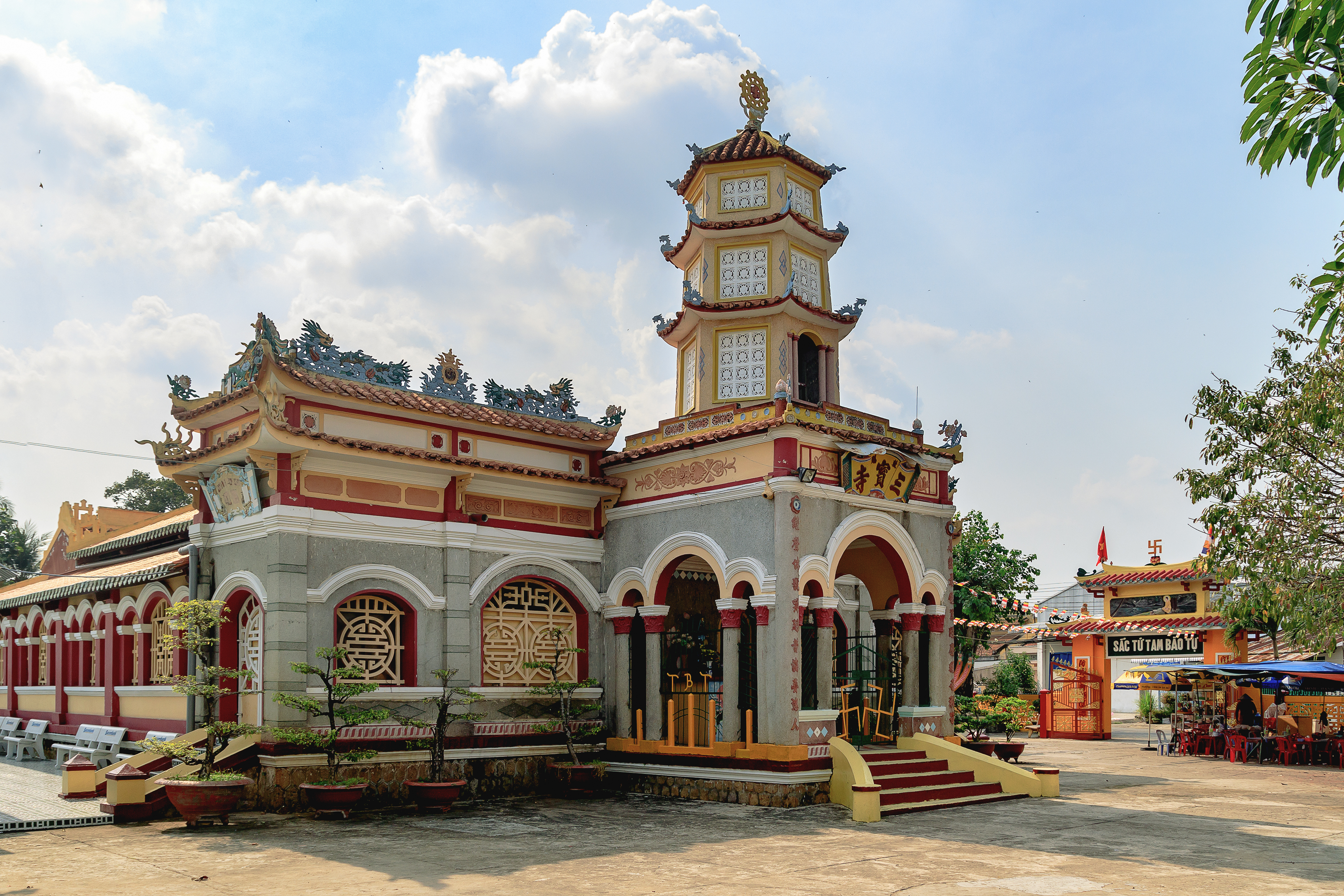

Religion
- Affiliation: Buddhism
- Sect: Lâm Tế (Ch'an/Zen)
- Ecclesiastical or organizational status: National historical and cultural relic (recognized 1988)

Location
- Location: 3 Sư Thiện Ân Street, Vĩnh Bảo Ward, Rạch Giá, Kiên Giang Province, Vietnam
- Interactive map of Tam Bảo Temple
- Coordinates: 10°0′28″N 105°5′3″E

Architecture
- Type: Vietnamese
- Founder: Dương Thị Oán

Tam Bảo Temple (Vietnamese: Chùa Tam Bảo), also known as Sắc Tứ Tam Bảo or Chùa Ông Đồng, is a historic Buddhist temple located in Rạch Giá, Kiên Giang Province, Vietnam. Established in the late 18th century, it played a pivotal role in the revival of Vietnamese Buddhism during the 1930s and 1940s, serving as a center for charitable activities, educational initiatives, and covert revolutionary operations against French colonial rule. Recognized as a national historical and cultural relic in 1988, the temple occupies nearly 10,000 square meters and continues to function as the office for the Kiên Giang Provincial Buddhist Association.

== History ==
The temple originated as a modest hermitage constructed by Dương Thị Oán in the late 18th century at Vĩnh Thanh Vân village. In 1789, it provided shelter and aid to Nguyễn Ánh (later Emperor Gia Long) during his flight from the Tây Sơn dynasty, including silk threads to repair oar handles for his sea voyage. In gratitude, Emperor Gia Long granted it imperial status as "Sắc Tứ Tam Bảo" in 1802.

Initially built with simple wood, bamboo, and thatch, the temple saw no prominent monastic leadership until 1913, when local lay followers invited Venerable Thích Trí Thiền (lay name Nguyễn Văn Đồng, born 1882) to serve as abbot. Under his guidance, a major reconstruction occurred from 1915 to 1917, establishing its current architectural form and earning it the nickname "Chùa Ông Đồng" in reference to Trí Thiền. He also founded additional temples and infrastructure, such as Hòa Thạnh, Vĩnh Phước, Long Sơn, and a 100-span bridge.

In 1936, Trí Thiền collaborated with monk Thiện Chiếu (lay name Nguyễn Văn Sáng, born 1898) to establish the Kiêm Tế Buddhist Studies Association at the temple, with Trí Thiền as Chief Administrator. Approved in 1937, the association focused on progressive Buddhist practices, including Vietnam's first Western-style Buddhist orphanage, free clinics, literacy classes, elderly care, poverty relief, and regular Dharma lectures. It published the magazine Tiến Hóa starting in 1938, edited by Thiện Chiếu under pseudonyms, advocating scientific materialism and reforms like permitting monks to marry.

During the 1940s, the temple became a covert hub for the Việt Minh in the Nam Kỳ Uprising, hosting secret meetings of the Nam Kỳ Provincial Committee and storing weapons, documents, and leaflets. On June 14, 1941, French colonial authorities raided the site, arresting Trí Thiền and monk Thiện Ân. Trí Thiền received a life sentence at Côn Đảo prison, where he died in 1943 following a hunger strike against inhumane conditions. Thiện Ân was executed, and the association dissolved, leading to the temple's temporary closure.

Reopened after the August Revolution in 1945, the temple held memorial ceremonies for the fallen. In 1996, Trí Thiền and Thiện Ân were posthumously recognized as martyrs. A stupa was added in 1972–1974, and on March 22, 1988, it was designated a national historical and cultural relic by the Ministry of Culture, Sports and Tourism.

== Architecture ==
Situated on elevated, airy terrain facing east, the temple features a large lotus pond and rock garden at the entrance, contributing to its serene ambiance. The main hall adopts an upper-floor, lower-veranda design, with altars intricately carved and gilded in motifs such as "Lưỡng Long triều Nguyệt" (Two Dragons Facing the Moon), "Song Phụng Triều Châu" (Two Phoenixes Facing a Boat), and "Bát Tiên" (Eight Immortals). Wooden statues of key Buddhist figures, including Maitreya (Di Lặc), Cundi (Chuẩn Đề), Kṣitigarbha (Địa Tạng), Manjushri (Văn Thù), Samantabhadra (Phổ Hiền), and Avalokitesvara (Quan Âm), exhibit exceptional artistic craftsmanship.

== Cultural and historical significance ==
Tam Bao Temple embodies the fusion of spiritual practice and social activism in Vietnamese Buddhism, particularly during the national revival movement from 1930 to 1945. It remains a site for monastic retreats and attracts visitors for its historical ties to anti-colonial resistance and charitable legacies. As one of over 160 relics in Kiên Giang Province, with 43 ranked at national or provincial levels, it supports "du lịch về nguồn" (return-to-origins tourism), highlighting patriotism and the struggle for independence.

== See also ==
- Nguyễn Trung Trực Temple, a nearby temple
