= Gò Quao district =

Coordinates: 9.750°N 105.333°E

Gò Quao district Huyện Gò Quao
- District
- Interactive map of Gò Quao district
- Country: Vietnam
- Region: Mekong Delta
- Province: Kiên Giang
- Capital: Gò Quao

Area
  - Total: 424.4 km^{2} (163.9 sq mi)

Population (2018)
  - Total: 145,780
- Time zone: UTC+7 (Indochina Time)

Gò Quao is a former rural district (huyện) of Kiên Giang province in the Mekong River Delta region of Vietnam.

== Divisions ==
The district is divided into the following communes:

Gò Quao, Thủy Liểu, Vĩnh Hòa Hưng Bắc, Vĩnh Hòa Hưng Nam, Vĩnh Phước A, Vĩnh Phước B, Định An, Định Hòa, Vĩnh Tuy, Vĩnh Thắng and Thới Quản.

As of 2003 the district had a population of 145,425. The district covers an area of 424.4 km^{2}. The district capital lies at Gò Quao.
