= Kiên Lương district =

Kiên Lương district Huyện Kiên Lương
- District
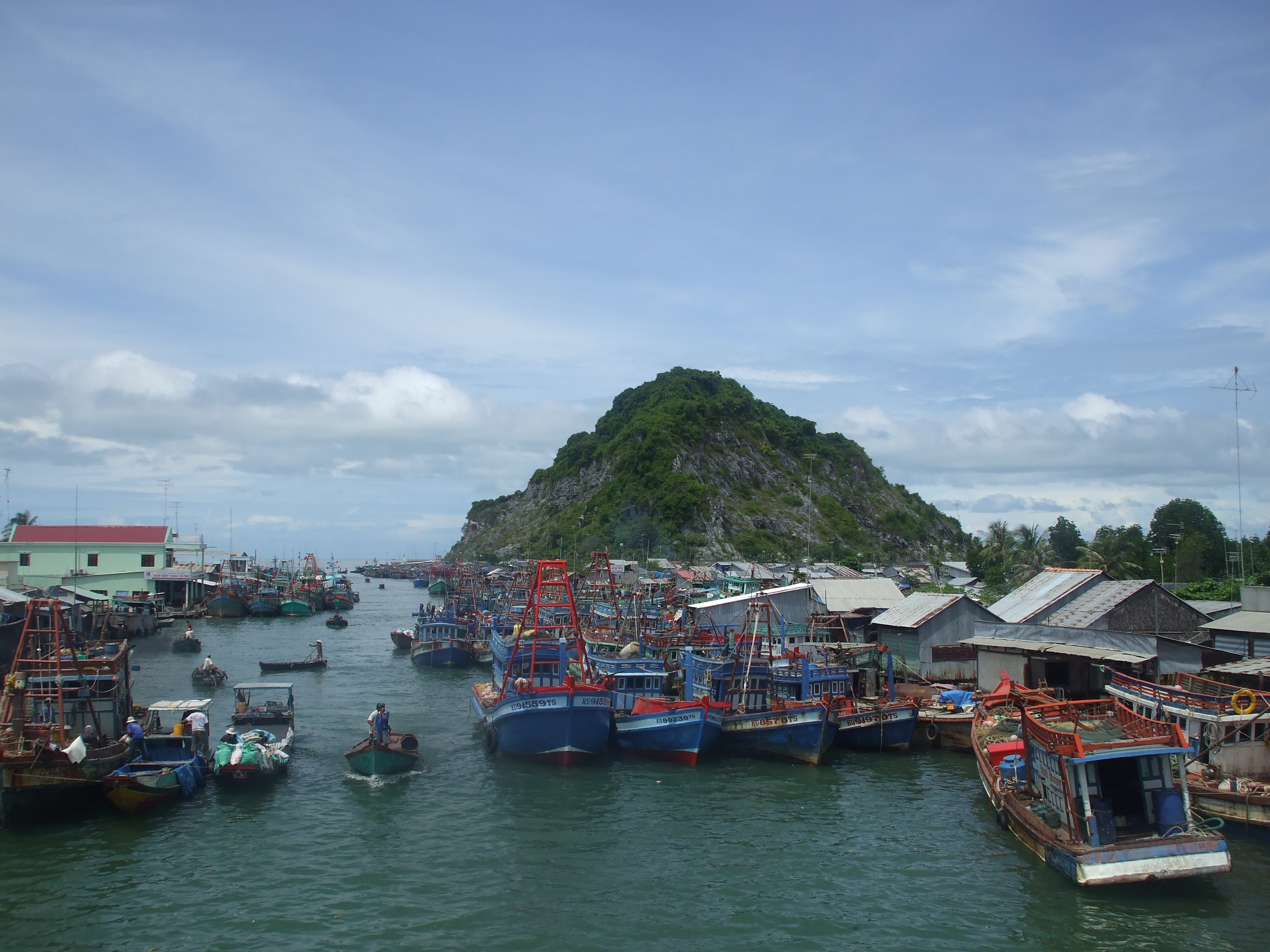
- Fishing quay at Ba Hòn
- Interactive map of Kiên Lương district
- Country: Vietnam
- Region: Mekong Delta
- Province: Kiên Giang
- Capital: Kiên Lương

Area
  - Total: 350 sq mi (906 km^{2})

Population (2019)
  - Total: 112,440
- Time zone: UTC+7 (Indochina Time)

Kiên Lương is a former rural district (huyện) of Kiên Giang province in the Mekong Delta region of Vietnam.

== Divisions ==
The district is subdivided to 8 commune-level subdivisions, including Kiên Lương township and the rural communes of: Bình An, Bình Trị, Dương Hoà, Hoà Điền, Kiên Bình, Hòn Nghệ and Sơn Hải.

As of 2003 the district had a population of 93,905. The district covers an area of 906 km^{2}. The district capital lies at Kiên Lương.

== See also ==
- Bà Lụa Islands
