= Đốc Binh Kiều =

Vietnamese revolutionary

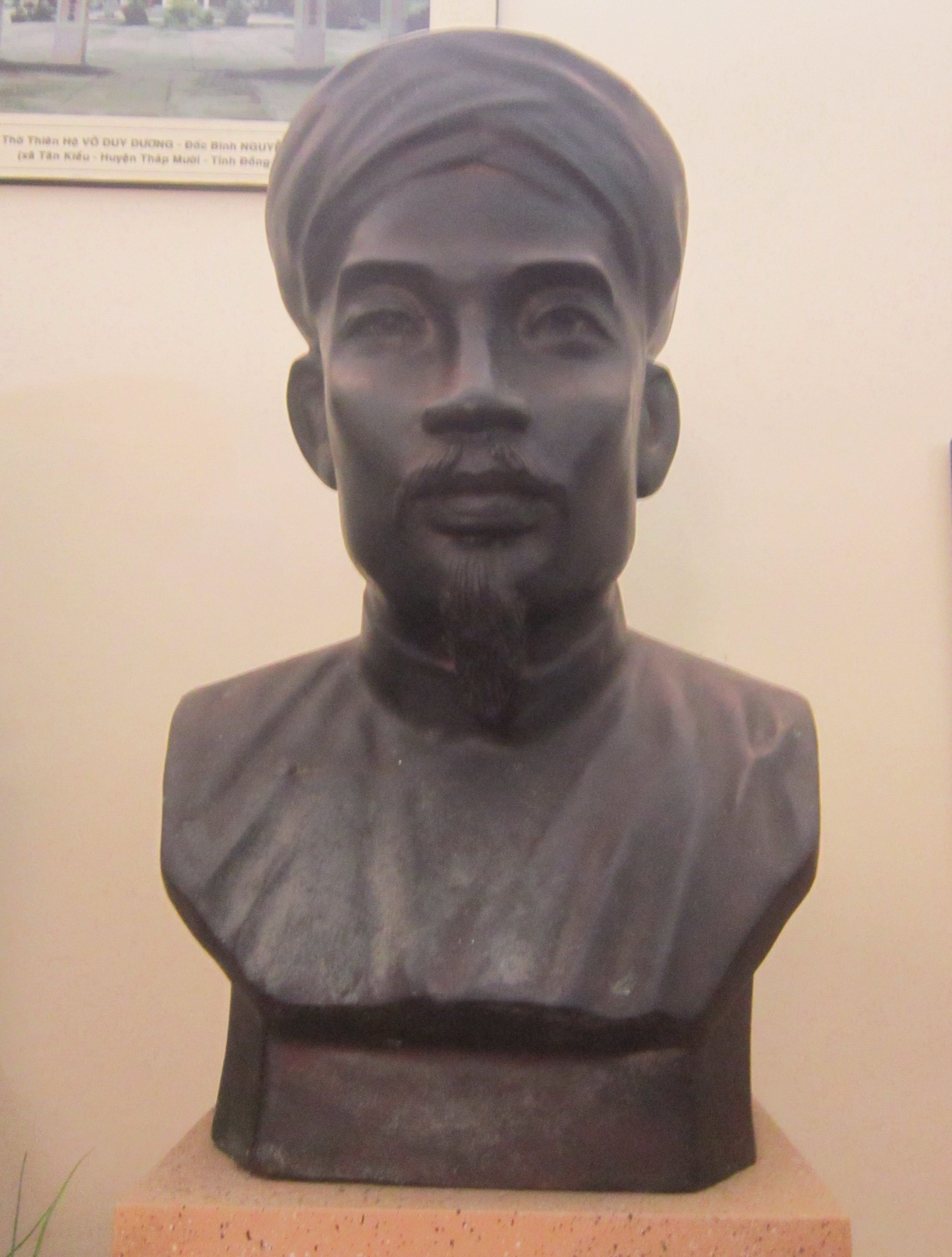
A statue of Nguyễn Tấn Kiều

Đốc Binh Kiều (?–1886) real name Nguyễn Tấn Kiều, or Lê Công Kiều and was given the name Quan Lớn Thượng by common folks; was a Deputy General of Võ Duy Dương in the anti-colonial revolution against French in Đồng Tháp Mười in the second half of the 19th century in Vietnam.
