= Bình Sơn district =

Coordinates: 15.333°N 108.667°E

Bình Sơn district Huyện Bình Sơn
- District
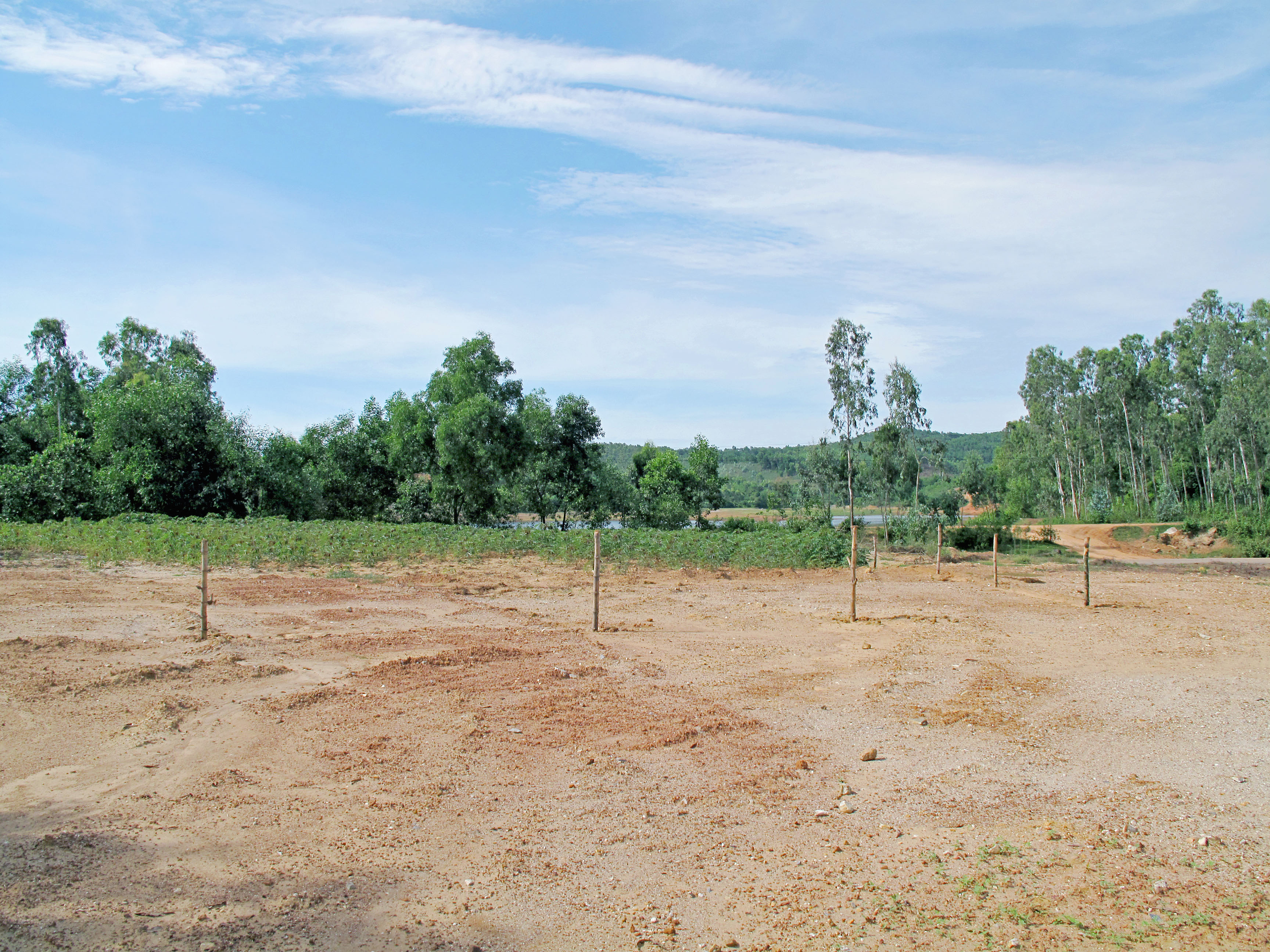
- Bình Thanh Đông fields
- Interactive map of Bình Sơn district
- Country: Vietnam
- Region: South Central Coast
- Province: Quảng Ngãi
- Capital: Châu Ổ

Area
  - Total: 179 sq mi (464 km^{2})

Population (2003)
  - Total: 177,943
- Time zone: UTC+07:00 (Indochina Time)

Bình Sơn is a rural district (huyện) of Quảng Ngãi province in the South Central Coast region of Vietnam. It is the birthplace of the Vietnamese mandarin and anti-French guerrilla leader Trương Định. As of 2003 the district had a population of 177,943. The district covers an area of 464 km^{2} (179 sq mi). The district capital lies at Châu Ổ.
