= Nguyễn Trung Trực =

Vietnamese militia organizer (1838–1868)

Nguyễn Trung Trực 阮 忠 直
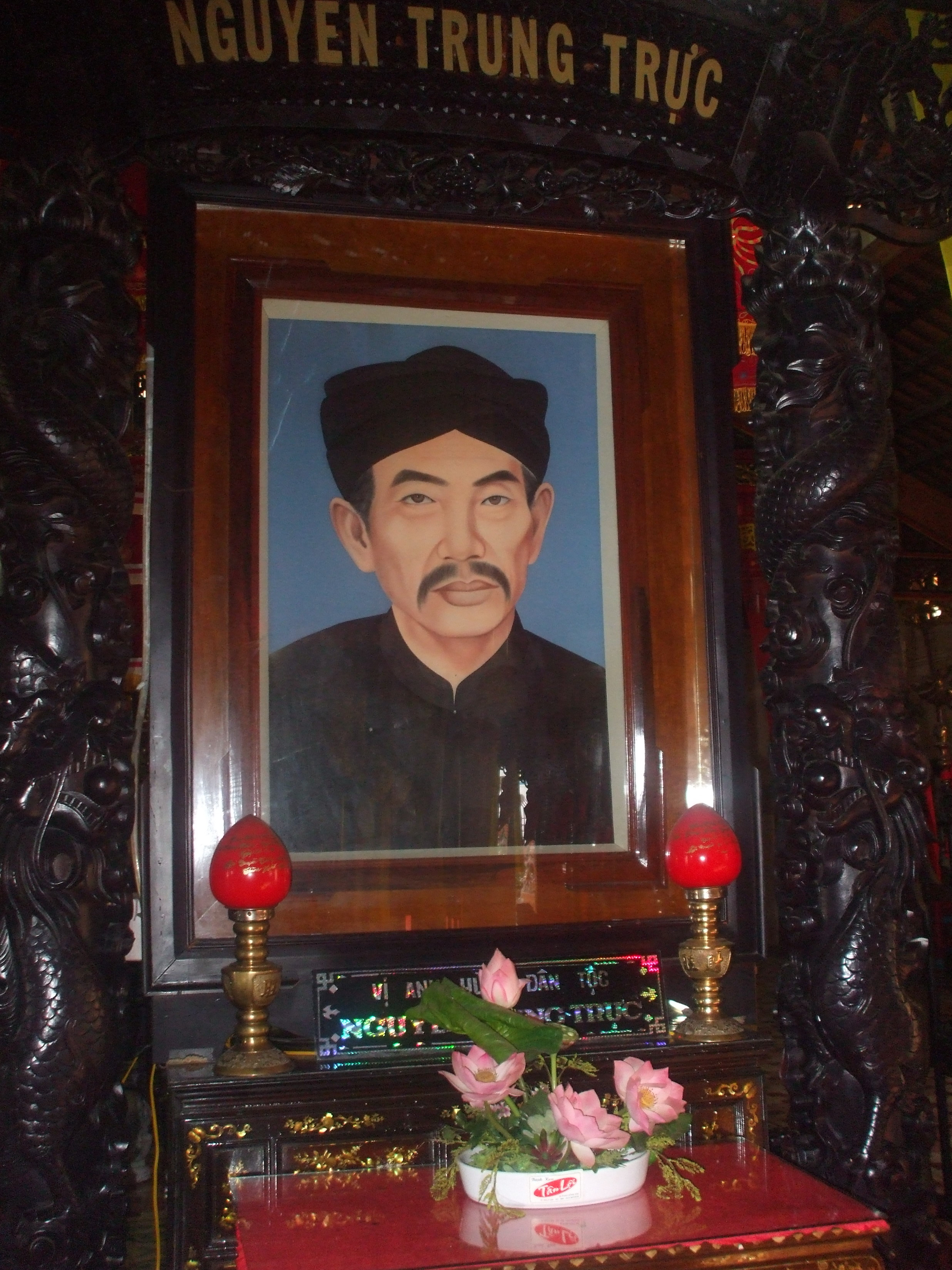
- Nguyễn Trung Trực, 19th century Vietnamese anti-colonial military commander (Note: In a study on historical figures of the South, researcher Trương Minh Đạt, a member of the Vietnam Folklore Association, currently living in Hà Tiên town, published a reliable document about this portrait. According to Mr. Đạt, before 1949 - 1950, there was no book that published this photo of Sir Nguyễn Trung Trực, but "the photo everyone knows today actually appeared around 1951-1952. The photo was printed by a newspaper in Saigon in the form of a supplement for readers. Regarding the origin of the image of Nguyễn Trung Trực, the artist explained that he modeled after other heroes to redraw: nose, ears, mouth of Phan Đình Phùng; Thủ khoa Huân's eyes; Đề Thám's mustache; the face in general is that of a southern farmer".)
- Born: 1838; Tân An, Six Provinces of Southern Vietnam
- Died: October 27, 1868 (aged 29–30); Rạch Giá, Cochinchina
- Other names: Quản Chơn; Quản Lịch; Ông Soái
- Organization: Nguyễn dynasty

Notes
- Provincial Military Lead of Hà Tiên

Nguyễn Trung Trực (1838 (Note: According to the book Hỏi đáp lịch sử Việt Nam 4th episode by Nhà xuất bản Trẻ in 2007. Judging from the record of interrogation Nguyễn Trung Trực at Sài Gòn prison in 10 October 1868, Trực said "I'm just 30 years old", then he would be born on 1838. Nguyễn Q. Thắng and Nguyễn Bá Thế, Từ điển nhân vật Việt Nam said that he was born on 1837. Many documents say that he was just 30 years old when he sacrificed himself (1838-1868). However, all the photographs and statues of Nguyễn Trung Trực in Southern Vietnam showing a stubby man with a long beard around 50-60 years old. To explain this, people said that Trực is a talented, young general, in order to build prestige when he mobilizes all classes, especially scholar, Trực must disguise himself as an elderly. On the other hand, the aforementioned disguise also aimed to bypass the eyes of the French henchmen and pointers.) – 27 October 1868), born Nguyễn Văn Lịch, was a Vietnamese fisherman who organized and led village militia forces which fought against French colonial forces in the Mekong Delta in southern Vietnam in the 1860s. He was active in Tân An (now part of Tây Ninh Province) and Rạch Giá (now part of An Giang province) from the initial French invasion until he was captured and executed.

== Biography ==
Nguyễn Trung Trực was born in 1838 in Nghề hamlet, Bình Nhựt village, Cửu Cư Hạ canton, Cửu An district, Tân An fu, Gia Định province (now is Nghề hamlet, Thạnh Đức commune, Bến Lức district, Long An province). His grandfather was Nguyễn Văn Đạo, his father was Nguyễn Văn Phụng (people called Thăng or Trường) and his mother was Lê Kim Hồng.
When he was young, he had the name "Chơn". His name Chơn, along with his straightforward personality, so he was given another name Trung Trực (straightforward) from his teacher. (Note: According to the books Hỏi đáp lịch sử Việt Nam episode 4 (page 46), Sách Hỏi đáp về cuộc khởi nghĩa Nguyễn Trung Trực (Nhà xuất bản QĐND, 2008, tr. 54) and Phan Thành Tài (in Nam Bộ - đất và người, compiled by Hội Khoa học lịch sử TP. HCM, Nhà xuất bản Trẻ, page 167), they all said that when Trực retreated to Hòn Chông, he changed his name to Nguyễn Trung Trực.)

== French invasion ==
The process of Vietnam's colonization began in September 1858 when a Franco-Spanish force landed at Đà Nẵng in central Vietnam and attempted to proceed to the Vietnamese imperial capital of Huế. After meeting stiff resistance, they sailed down to the less-defended south, and quickly captured the Citadel of Saigon in February 1859, before looting and razing it. The leaderless and defeated imperial troops fled in disarray. The French then withdrew, but returned in 1861 in a more serious attempt to claim and occupy Vietnamese territory. In February of that year, the French attacked the citadel of Kỳ Hòa, seizing the fort after two days, along with a large quantity of small arms, artillery and food. Trương Định, a local partisan leader who fought at Kỳ Hòa, incorporated soldiers from the defeated imperial army into his ranks, as its commander had committed suicide.

In 1861, the resistance leaders in the Gò Công area delegated Định to travel to Biên Hòa to seek permission from imperial military commissioner Nguyễn Bá Nghi to "turn around the situation". Định's men were armed with bladed spears, fire lances, knives, sabers, bamboo sticks and swords, trained and on call as necessary. Trực was one of the partisan leaders who assisted Định. Trực's partisan band was based at Tân An The French were aware of his activities, with an intelligence dossier calling him a "likable and intelligent man".

== Strategy ==
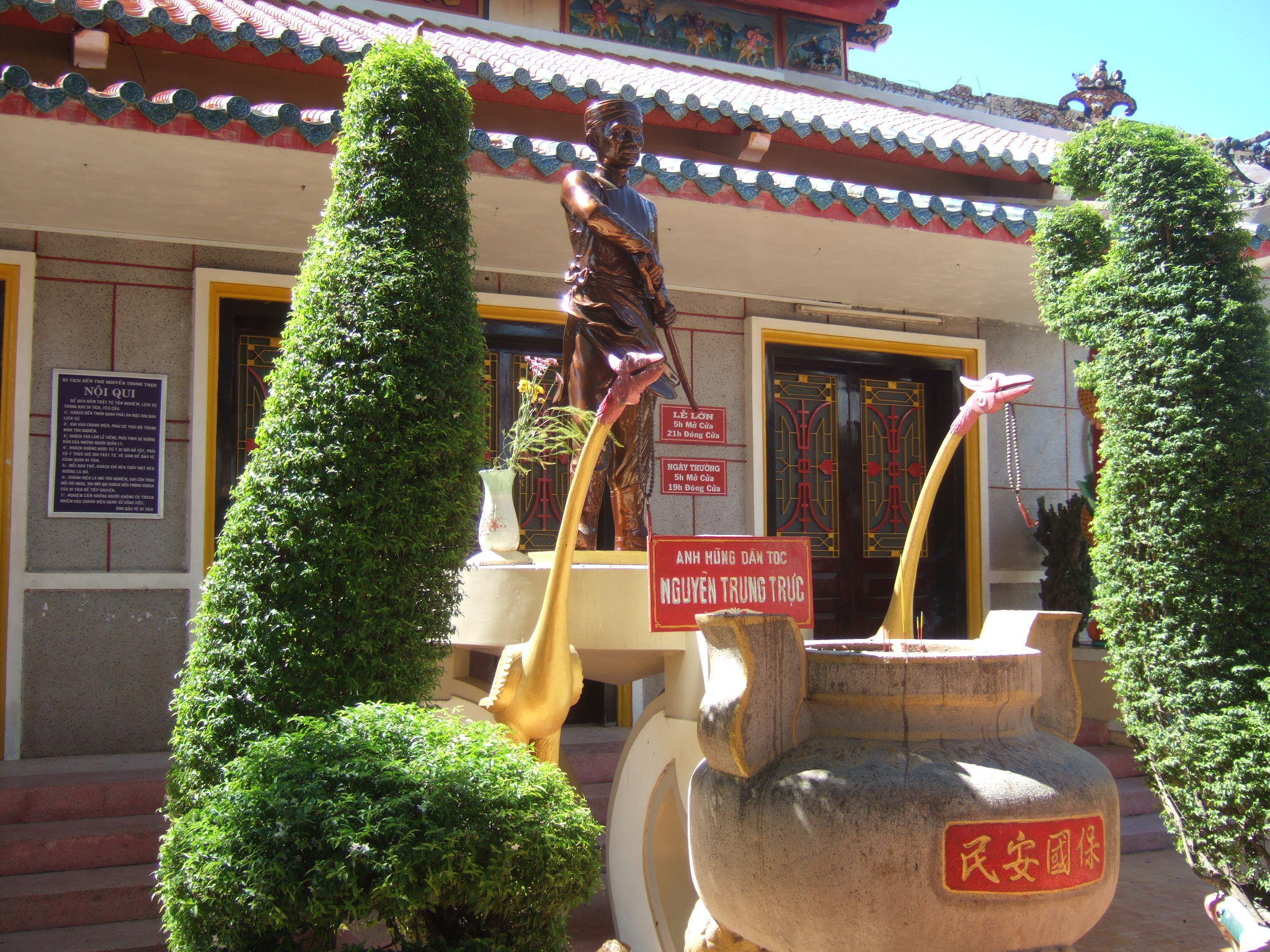
Statue of Nguyễn Trung Trực in front of a shrine dedicated to him in Rạch Giá.

In the initial phase of the conflict, the local militias concentrated on evacuating the populace from areas that had been taken over by the French, while urging those who chose to stay to not cooperate with the Europeans. Snipers were deployed into the occupied areas to assassinate isolated French soldiers. The partisan forces at Gò Công grew to around 6,000 men by June 1861, and the French had begun to report that junks from Singapore and Hong Kong had arrived with shipments of European-made weapons. The forces began inflicting substantial casualties on the European troops, largely because of their intimate knowledge of the terrain, skill in hit-and-run guerrilla tactics, and support from villagers. They focused on chasing French soldiers around the countryside, attacking military installations that were left undefended as a consequence of their guerrilla pursuit.

One of the main objectives of the resistance was to disrupt the transport of rice to Chợ Lớn, the main commercial hub of southern Vietnam, by attacking and either destroying or capturing French-controlled cargo transports (called lorchas) using the local waterways. A French report in November 1861 noted that shipping had been severely disrupted despite high levels of French naval protection. The most notable of the seaborne attacks was Trực's burning of the lorcha L'Esperance on Nhật Tảo canal (Note: Nhật Tảo is the same as Nhựt Tảo. Southern Vietnamese used to call it Vàm Nhựt Tảo.) on 10 December 1861.

== Sinking of L'Espérance ==
The Nhật Tảo canal connected the eastern and western branches of the Vàm Cỏ river. The French frequently used the Vàm Cỏ in their operations, utilising it to travel between the town of Mỹ Tho in the rice-growing Mekong Delta, and Gia Định and Chợ Lớn, the main city and business hub in southern Vietnam. The strategic importance of Nhật Tảo canal to the French transport of rice led them to build three military outposts in close proximity. They were at Rach Kien to the north, Tân An to the east and Gia Thanh to the south. The canal had been the previous object of partisan activity with the objective of disrupting the French network.

The attack against L'Espérance started at midday at Nhật Tảo village, 10 km southwest of Tân An. Today the site is the location of An Nhựt Tân village in Tân Trụ District of Long An Province. Trực's 150 men were grouped into three columns. The first group of 61 men under Huỳnh Khắc Nhượng's command attacked a nearby pro-French village in order to provoke an incident and lure the French forces into an ambush. Trực commanded the second group of 59 partisans along with Võ Văn Quang, and was assigned to burn and sink the vessel. A third force of 30 men was commanded by Hồ Quang and Nguyễn Văn Học. Their objective was to impede any French reinforcements and to help in the attack on the vessel.

After Nhượng's men had attacked the village, Lieutenant Parfait, commander of the lorcha, instructed his troops to follow them to nearby villages. Trực's group, who had disguised themselves as rice merchants, travelled in five boats and approached the French vessel under the pretext of applying for travel permits. (some sources said that they disguised as wedding boats) When the boats came within range, Trực and his men boarded the vessel using hand-to-hand weapons such as knives and bayonets, killing 20 French sailors and their Vietnamese assistants. The attack took place so quickly that the crew were unable to send distress signals for reinforcements. The 30 men under the command of Quang and Học, who were intended to block French reinforcements, jumped into the water and used axes to scuttle the lorcha, before setting it ablaze. Only five of the crew, two French and three Filipinos, managed to escape death by hiding in the bushes by the waterside for three days.

When Lieutenant Parfait returned, he attempted to retaliate against the surrounding villages. However, the villagers had been aware of events and had already been evacuated, so the French officer managed only to burn and destroy the houses, livestock and rice fields.

In this battle, the French army suffered a great loss: L'Espérance was sunk, 17 soldiers and 20 pro-French Vietnamese associates were killed, only eight people escaped, including 2 French soldiers and 6 Tagal soldiers (mercenaries from Philippines). The Vietnamese Resistance force won but there were 4 people who died, all of which were honored by Emperor Tự Đức.

The attack buoyed local Vietnamese morale and gave them the belief that they could have a fighting chance against French naval forces. The French Inspector of Indigenous Affairs at Thủ Dầu Một, Grammont, stated that "This event made a big impression on the Vietnamese. They considered it as a destined turn of their fortune." The sinking earned the specific praise of Emperor Tự Đức, who described the incident as "most outstanding". This prompted the emperor to promote Trực to be the Provincial Military Lead (Chinese: 領兵, Vietnamese: Lãnh binh) of Hà Tiên.

== Later career ==
However, the overall Vietnamese military performance was not as successful. On 5 June 1862, the court's plenipotentiary Phan Thanh Giản and another official Lâm Duy Hiệp signed the Treaty of Saigon. This agreement ceded the three southern provinces of Gia Định, Định Tường and Biên Hòa to become the French colony of Cochinchina. The treaty was accompanied by financial compensation to France, religious concessions to missionaries and commercial opportunities to European merchants. Nevertheless, Trực continued his resistance in defiance of the treaty. On 15 June 1866, in one attack, he killed five French officers and captured 100 firearms, then returned to Hà Tiên where he built up another peasant movement at Cửa Cạn.

== Death ==
In mid-1868, Quản Lịch successfully attacked the French fortress at Kiên Giang in Rạch Giá, killing the French-installed provincial chief and 30 of the opposition troops. In order to capture his strongholds and regain the citadel, the French took his mother hostage. French forces then regained control of the fort and captured him. The French saw Nguyễn Trung Trực had a great influence on the anti-French movement in the South, so they tried to recruit him. The French commanders and their collaborator Huỳnh Công Tấn - also known as Đội Tấn, an old teammate of Quản Lịch under the command of General Trương Định - made many promises, bestowed titles and benefits but could not shake him. Nguyễn Trung Trực replied emphatically:

Bao giờ Tây nhổ hết cỏ nước Nam, thì mới hết người Nam đánh Tây.

("Only when the Westerner pull out all grass of the Southern country, does the Southern people stop fighting against the Westerner.")

Nguyễn Trung Trực was beheaded by the French at Rạch Giá on October 27, 1868, at the age of 30.

Despite ordering the partisans to respect the Treaty of Saigon and stop fighting the French in the south, Tự Đức praised the "righteousness" of Nguyễn Trung Trực and his men. Following his death, the emperor composed a poem in his honor. Although Nguyễn Trung Trực was disobeying Tự Đức's orders to stop the insurgency, the emperor still viewed his actions as a service to the monarchy.

The ex governor (Vietnamese: Tuần phủ) of Hà Tiên province, Huỳnh Mẫn Đạt, a famous scholar of Cochinchina, wept for Nguyễn Trung Trực with a Lüshi verse

(Chinese)

吊阮忠直
勝負戎場不足論，
頹波砥柱憶漁民。
火紅日早轟天地，
劍白堅江泣鬼神。
一旦非常標節義，
兩全無畏報君親。
英雄強脛芳名壽，

羞殺低頭未死人。

(Sino-Vietnamese)

Điếu Nguyễn Trung Trực
Thắng phụ nhung trường bất túc luân,
Đồi ba để trụ ức ngư dân.
Hoả hồng Nhật Tảo oanh thiên địa,
Kiếm bạch Kiên Giang khấp quỷ thần.
Nhất đán phi thường tiêu tiết nghĩa,
Lưỡng toàn vô uý báo quân thân.
Anh hùng cường hĩnh phương danh thọ, (Note: Original Chinese, 脛 / hĩnh / shin NOT 頸 / cảnh / neck when translated to Sino-Vietnamese / English.)

Tu sát đê đầu vị tử nhân.

(English)

Weep for Nguyễn Trung Trực

The bright flames reddening Nhật Tảo cause the earth to quake,
The shiny swords silvering Kiên Giang make the devils wail.

== Legacy ==
The national hero Nguyễn Trung Trực is honored by the people as a major god. People in Southern Vietnam call him by "Cụ Nguyễn" (Sir Nguyễn). Southern people, especially laypeople, followers of Hòa Hảo Buddhism, which is the endogenous religion of the Bửu Sơn Kỳ Hương sect, all set up altars with statues or photos of Sir Nguyễn. All Hòa Hảo Buddhist followers greatly admire and respect the national hero Nguyễn Trung Trực, calling him "Ông Soái" (Sir Marshal).

Nowadays, the establishment of worshiping Nguyễn Trung Trực as the main god is built in 6 provinces in the Mekong Delta, including: Kiên Giang, An Giang, Hậu Giang, Sóc Trăng, Bạc Liêu and Long An. Particularly in Kiên Giang province, there are 13 communal houses worshiping Sir Nguyễn as the main god. Every year, on the occasion of the festival commemorating the death of Sir Nguyễn, people from all over the country make pilgrimages to attend.
