= Kiên Lương =

Kiên Lương Xã Kiên Lương
- Commune
- Kiên Lương town
- Interactive map of Kiên Lương
- Coordinates: 10°17′04″N 104°38′35″E
- Country: Vietnam
- Region: Mekong Delta
- Province: An Giang

Area
  - Total: 13.51 sq mi (35.00 km^{2})

Population (2003)
  - Total: 24,287
  - Density: 1,800/sq mi (694/km^{2})
- Time zone: UTC+7 (UTC + 7)

Kiên Lương is a commune of An Giang Province in the Mekong Delta region of Vietnam. As of 2003, the town had a population of 24,287. The town covers an area of 35 km².

The town is 27 km southeast of Hà Tiên and 62 km northwest of Rạch Giá.
