= Tân Hiệp district =

Tan Hiep district Huyện Tân Hiệp
- District
- Interactive map of Tan Hiep district
- Country: Vietnam
- Region: Mekong Delta
- Province: Kiên Giang
- Capital: Tân Hiệp

Area
  - Total: 160.8 sq mi (416.5 km^{2})

Population (2018)
  - Total: 151,000
- Time zone: UTC+7 (Indochina Time)

Tân Hiệp was a rural district of Kiên Giang province in the Mekong River Delta region of Vietnam.

As part of major nationwide reforms, its central township and several constituent communes have been consolidated into a single commune named Tân Hiệp Hamlet (Xã Tân Hiệp).

== Divisions ==
The district is divided into the following communes:

Tân Hiệp, Tân Hiệp A, Tân Hiệp B, Tân An, Tân Thành, Tân Hội, Thạnh Đông, Thạnh Đông A, Thạnh Đông B and Thạnh Trị.

As of 2003, the district had a population of 147,821. The district covers an area of 416.5 km^{2}. The district capital lies at Tân Hiệp.
