= Giồng Riềng district =

Coordinates: 9.917°N 105.417°E

Giồng Riềng district Huyện Giồng Riềng
- District
- Interactive map of Giồng Riềng district
- Country: Vietnam
- Region: Mekong Delta
- Province: Kiên Giang
- Capital: Giồng Riềng

Area
  - Total: 245 sq mi (634 km^{2})

Population (2018)
  - Total: 219,960
- Time zone: UTC+7 (Indochina Time)

Giồng Riềng is a former rural district (huyện) of Kiên Giang province in the Mekong River Delta region of Vietnam.

== Divisions ==
The district is divided into the following communes:

Giồng Riềng, Thạnh Lộc, Thạnh Hưng, Thạnh Hoà, Thạnh Phước, Ngọc Thuận, Ngọc Chúc, Ngọc Thành, Ngọc Hoà, Hoà Lợi, Hoà Hưng, Hoà An, Hoà Thuận, Vĩnh Thạnh, Vĩnh Phú, Bàn Thạch, Long Thạnh and Bàn Tân Định.

As of 2003 the district had a population of 195,024. The district covers an area of 634 km^{2} (245 sq mi). The district capital lies at Giồng Riềng.
