= Châu Thành district, Kiên Giang =

Châu Thành district Huyện Châu Thành
- District
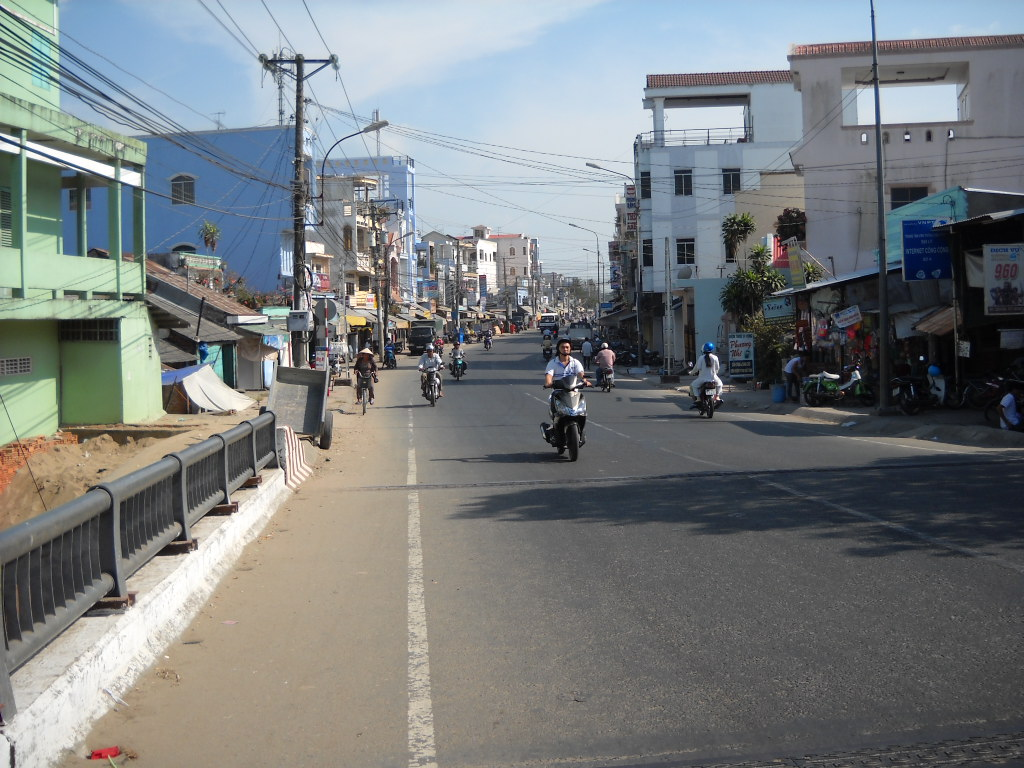
- Street in Minh Lương town
- Interactive map of Châu Thành district
- Country: Vietnam
- Region: Mekong Delta
- Province: Kiên Giang
- Capital: Minh Lương

Area
  - Total: 110 sq mi (284 km^{2})

Population (2018)
  - Total: 156,200
- Time zone: UTC+7 (Indochina Time)

Châu Thành is a rural district (huyện) of Kiên Giang province in the Mekong Delta region of Vietnam.

== Divisions ==
The district is divided into the following communes:

Minh Lương, Mong Thọ A, Mong Thọ B, Thanh Lộc, Giục Tượng, Vĩnh Hoà Hiệp, Bình An, Minh Hoà and Phía Tây

As of 2003 the district had a population of 139,211. The district covers an area of 284 km^{2}. The district capital lies at Minh Lương.
