= Võ Duy Dương =

Vietnamese warlord

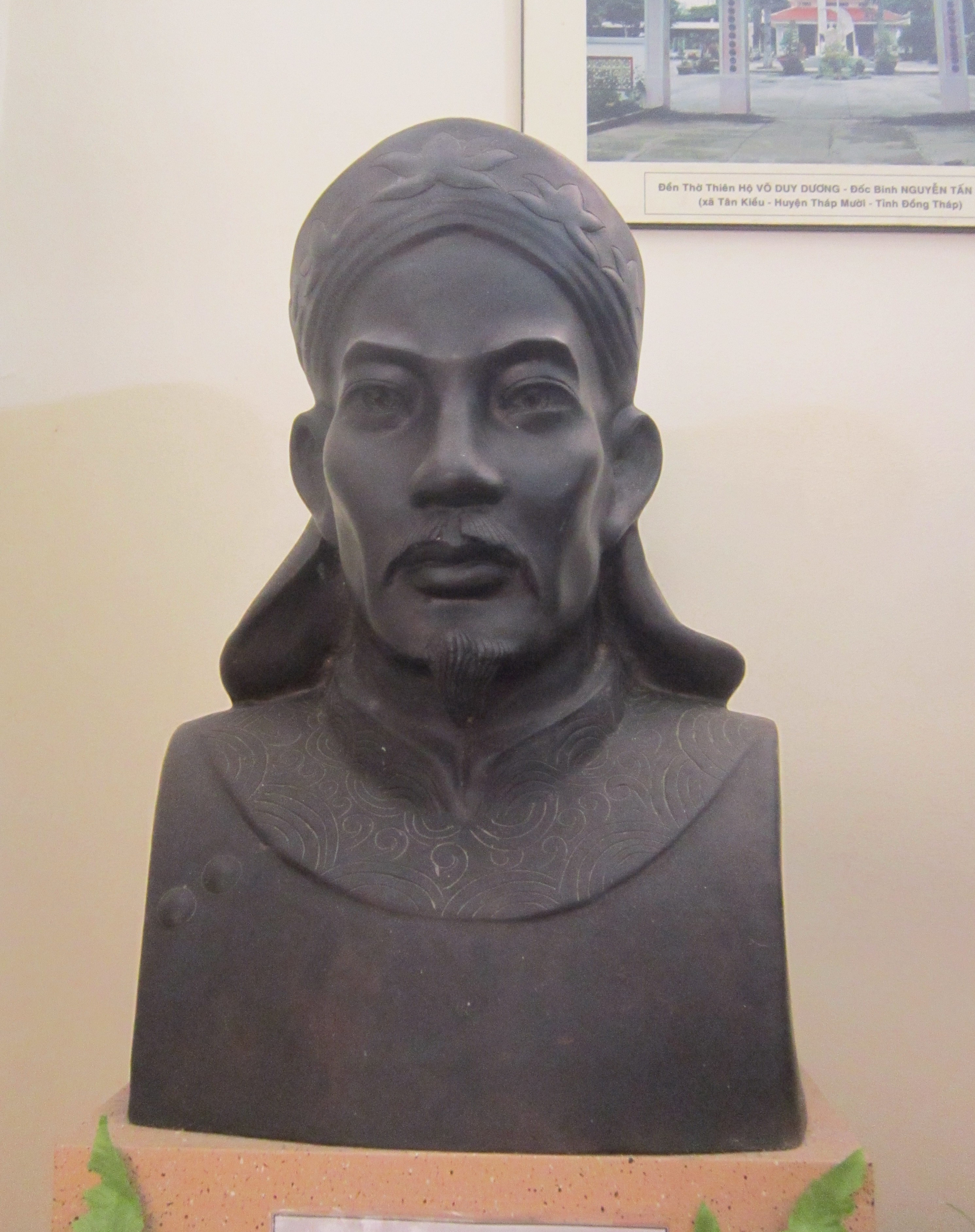
Bust of general Võ Duy Dương in Đồng Tháp Province Museum

Võ Duy Dương (武維楊; 1827–1866), also Thiên Hộ Dương (千戶楊) was a Vietnamese warlord who, after the submission of the Vietnamese government to the French in 1862, continued to fight against the French (1862-1866) in the wetlands of Đồng Tháp Mười.

In July 1865, Thiên Hộ Dương and his deputy, Đốc Binh Kiều led their forces attacked and defeated the French under interim governor Pierre-Gustave Roze at Mỹ Trà and Mỹ Quý.

== Related articles ==
Cochinchina | Định Tường province | Mỹ Tho province
