= Rạch Giá =

Ward and capital of An Giang province, Vietnam

- Ward
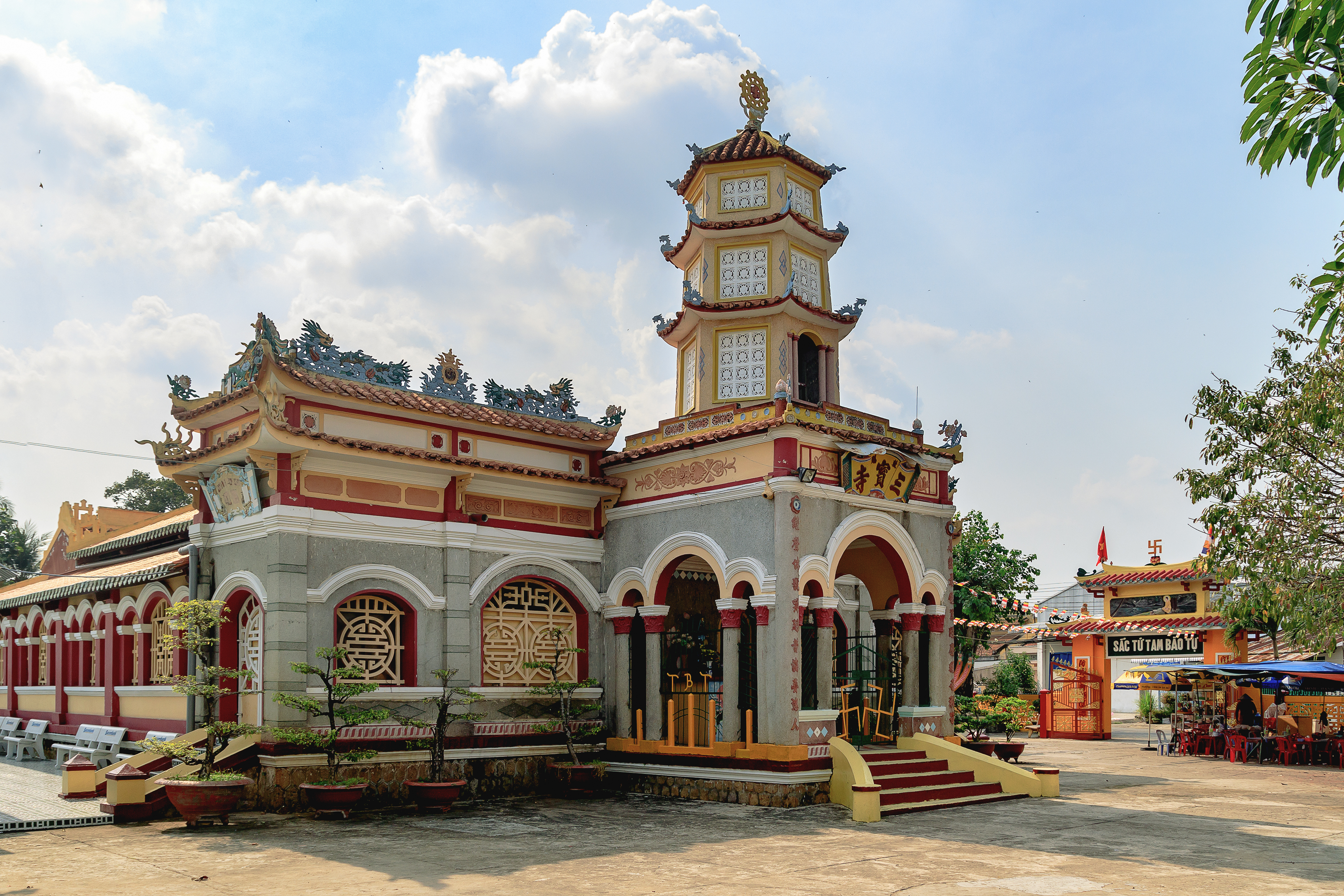
- Sắc Tứ Tam Bảo pagoda in Rạch Giá ward
- Interactive map of Rạch Giá
- Coordinates: 9°59′05″N 105°05′57″E
- Country: Vietnam
- Province: An Giang
- Establish: June 16, 2025
- Headquarters of the People's Committee: 38, Lê Lợi street, Rạch Giá ward

Area
  - Total: 45.53 km^{2} (17.58 sq mi)

Population (2025)
  - Total: 250,661 people
  - Density: 5,505/km^{2} (14,260/sq mi)

Rạch Giá is a ward in An Giang province. It is the location of the administrative center of An Giang province and is one of the 102 communes, wards, and special zones belonging to the province after the 2025 reorganization.

== Geography ==
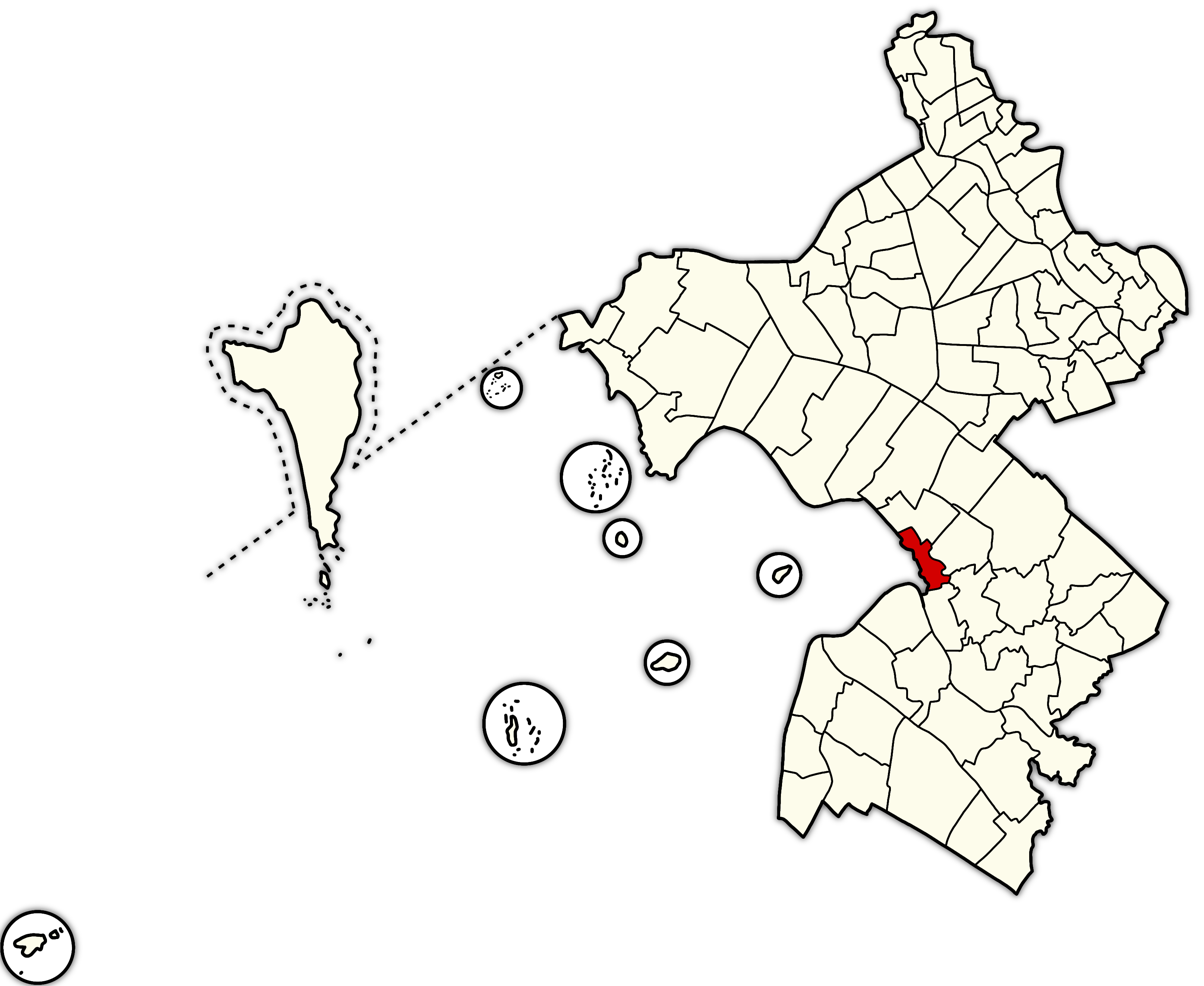
Location of Rạch Giá ward on An Giang province map (highlight in red).

Rạch Giá is a ward in An Giang province, with its coastline bordering the Gulf of Thailand. The ward has the following geographical location:

- To the north, it borders Vĩnh Thông ward.
- To the east, it borders Thạnh Lộc commune.
- To the south, it borders Châu Thành commune and Bình An commune.
- And to the west, its coastline bordering the gulf of Thailand

== History ==
Prior to 2025, Rạch Giá ward consisted of 9 wards: Vĩnh Quang, Vĩnh Thanh, Vĩnh Thanh Vân, Vĩnh Hiệp, Vĩnh Lạc, An Hòa, An Bình, Rạch Sỏi and Vĩnh Lợi, all belonging to Rạch Giá provincial city, Kiên Giang province.

On June 12, 2025, the National Assembly of Vietnam issued Resolution No. 202/2025/QH15 on the reorganization of provincial-level administrative units. Accordingly:

- An Giang province was established by merging the entire area and population of An Giang province and Kiên Giang province.

On June 16, 2025, the Standing Committee of the National Assembly of Vietnam issued Resolution No. 1654/NQ-UBTVQH15 on the reorganization of commune-level administrative units in An Giang province. Accordingly:

- Rạch Giá ward was established by merging the entire area and population of 9 wards: Vĩnh Quang, Vĩnh Thanh, Vĩnh Thanh Vân, An Hòa, Vĩnh Lạc, Vĩnh Hiệp, An Bình, Rạch Sỏi and Vĩnh Lợi (formerly part of Rạch Giá provincial city).
