= Kiên Giang province =

Former province of Vietnam

Kiên Giang
- Province
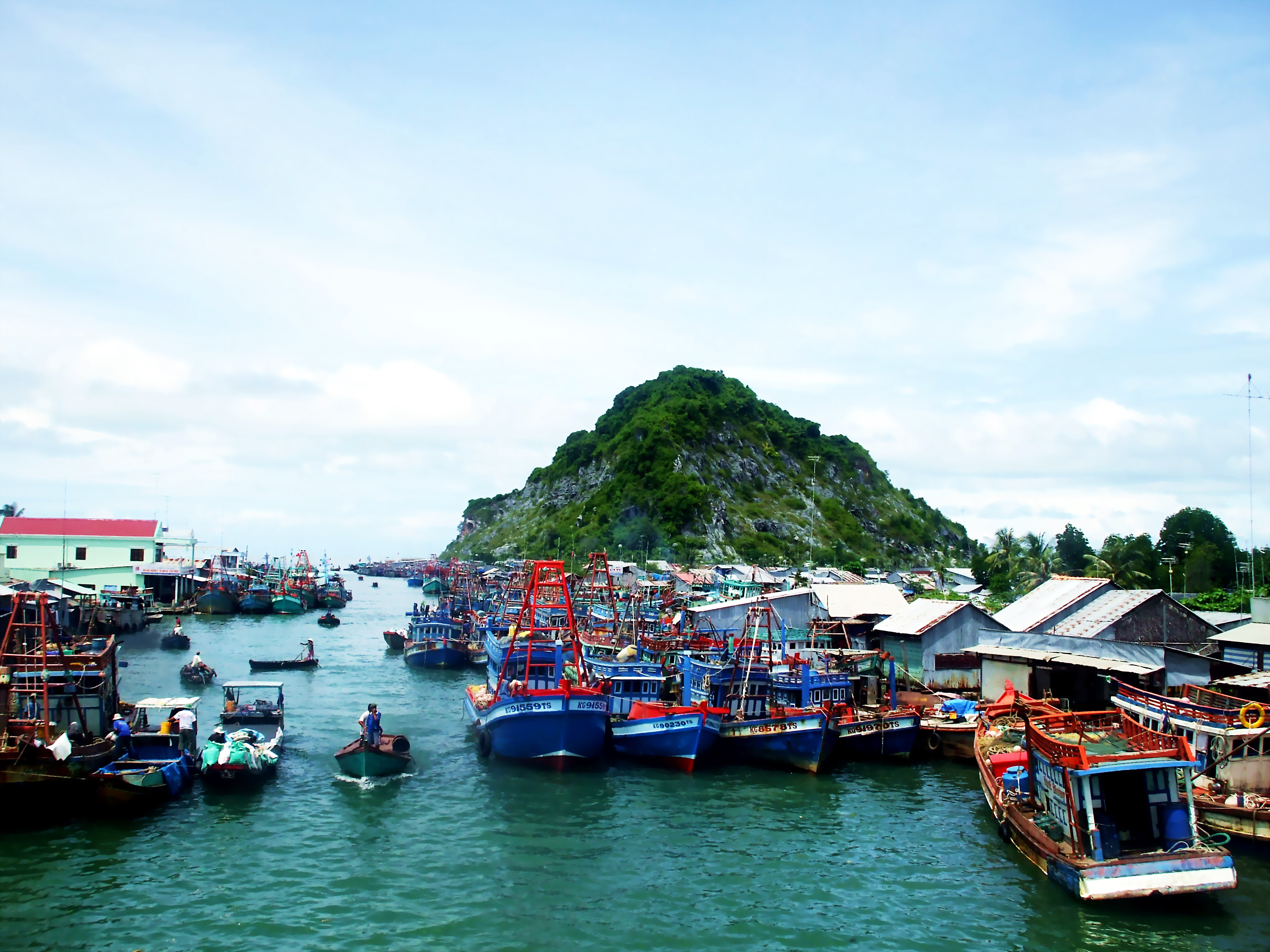

- Seal

- Location of Kiên Giang within Vietnam pre-merger
- Coordinates: 10°0′N 105°10′E
- Country: Vietnam
- Region: Mekong Delta
- Capital: Rạch Giá provincial city

Government
  - People's Council Chair: Mai Văn Huỳnh
  - People's Committee Chair: Lâm Minh Thành

Area
  - Total: 6,352.08 km^{2} (2,452.55 sq mi)

Population (2025)
  - Total: 2,210,387
  - Density: 347.978/km^{2} (901.260/sq mi)

Demographics
  - Ethnicities: Kinh, Khmer, Hoa, Chăm

GDP
  - Total: VND 87.284 trillion US$ 3.791 billion
- Time zone: UTC+7 (ICT)
- Postal code: 91xxx–92xxx
- Area codes: 297
- ISO 3166 code: VN-47
- HDI (2020): ▲0.683 (50th)
- Website: www.kiengiang.gov.vn

Kiên Giang was a former province of Vietnam, located in the Mekong Delta region of southern Vietnam. The province is known for fishing and rice farming.

The provincial capital is Rạch Giá, 155 mi (249 km) from Ho Chi Minh City. Kiên Giang's area is 6,352.02 km^{2} (2,452.53 mi^{2}) and its population is about 1,723,067 (2019), of which 22 percent live in urban areas.

Kiên Giang is bordered with An Giang province in the northeast, Cần Thơ and Hậu Giang provinces in the east, Bạc Liêu province in the southeast and Cà Mau province in the south, and Kampot province of Cambodia (with the 33 mi (53 km) border) in the west, and the Gulf of Thailand in the southwest (with the 124 mi (200 km) coast).

According to survey results on April 1, 2019, Kiên Giang province's population is 1,723,067 people.

On June 12, 2025, Kiên Giang was merged into An Giang province.

== Terminology ==
Kiên Giang roughly translates to "strong river". The province has no official Hán tự renditions, since it was created after the adoption of Chữ Quốc Ngữ.

== History ==
In 1774, Lord Nguyễn Phúc Khoát divided into 12 in the palace, but still leave the town of Hà Tiên, Mạc Thiên Tích as a ruler.

By the reign of Minh Mệnh, in 1832, Hà Tiên had become one of the six provinces of the south.

In 1876, France divided into four big administrative regions, each region divided into smaller administrative sub-district or county take action (administratif arrondissement), Hà Tiên, the former being divided into two particle parameters are Hà Tiên and Rạch Giá. From January 1, 1900, two-particle parameters of Hà Tiên and Rạch Giá became two provinces of Hà Tiên and Rạch Giá.

In 1976, Kiên Giang Province was established based on the former Rạch Giá Province and three districts from Long Châu Hà Province.

On 12 June 2025, as part of major nationwide reforms, Kiên Giang province was dissolved and merged with An Giang province.

== Geography ==
=== General ===
- Coordinates: 9°23'50" N to 10°32'30" N, 104°40' E to 105°32'40" E.
- Area: 6,299 km^{2} (2,432 sq mi), 4,119.74 km^{2} (1,590.64 sq mi) of agricultural land (66% natural area), private land for rice accounts for 3,170.19 km^{2} (1,224.02 sq mi) (77% of agricultural land). Forests cover 1,200.27 km^{2} (463.43 sq mi) (19% of the area). The province also contains 500.00 km^{2} (193.05 sq mi) of unused land.
- The average elevation of the province is 0.39 metres (1 ft 3 in) above sea level, making it vulnerable to sea level rise.

=== Natural condition ===
Kiên Giang has a diverse range of terrains including plains, mountains, forests, and islands. The mainland area is relatively flat, gradually sloping from the northeast to the southwest. Due to its low latitude and coastal location, Kiên Giang has a tropical monsoon climate, hot and humid year-round, with average monthly temperatures ranging from 27 to 27.5 °C. Although Kiên Giang is not directly affected by typhoons, rainfall from storms contributes a significant portion, especially at the end of the rainy season. The rainy season lasts from April to November, while the dry season runs from December to March of the following year. The average annual rainfall is about 1,600 – 2,000 mm on the mainland and 2,400 – 2,800 mm in the Phu Quoc island area. Kiên Giang's climate experiences very few natural disasters, with no cold spells or direct typhoons, and abundant sunlight and heat, making it highly favorable for the growth of various crops and livestock.

Kiên Giang has four main types of land: the freshwater alluvial zone in the western part of the Hậu River, the flood-prone acid sulfate soil zone in the Long Xuyên Quadrangle, the saline soil zone on the Cà Mau Peninsula, and the hilly and island zone in Phú Quốc and Kiên Hải. Of these, agricultural land accounts for 64.2% of the natural area, forest land covers 122.8 thousand hectares, land for special use 35.4 thousand hectares, and residential land 10.1 thousand hectares. In addition, the province has over 70 thousand hectares of fallow or unstable production land, including more than 25 thousand hectares of mixed gardens. Forests in Kiên Giang are limited, mostly consisting of protective forests. Kiên Giang also has relatively large mineral potential. Although exploration and research are still ongoing, preliminary assessments have identified 152 ore points and 23 different types of mineral mines. The province's total limestone reserves are currently at 440 million tons, with an exploitable amount of 342 million tons, including 235 million tons suitable for industrial exploitation — enough to produce 4.6 million tons of clinker per year for 40 years. Peat reserves are estimated at 150 million tons.

== Administration ==
Kiên Giang is subdivided into 14 district-level sub-divisions and three cities:

- 12 districts:

- An Biên
- An Minh
- Châu Thành
- Giang Thành
- Giồng Riềng
- Gò Quao
- Hòn Đất
- Kiên Hải Island
- Kiên Lương
- Tân Hiệp
- Thổ Châu
- Vĩnh Thuận
- U Minh Thượng

- 3 provincial cities:

- Phú Quốc
- Hà Tiên
- Rạch Giá (capital)

They are further subdivided into 12 commune-level towns (or townships), 118 communes, and 15 wards.
