= Bắc Kạn province =

Former province of Vietnam

Bắc Kạn
- Province
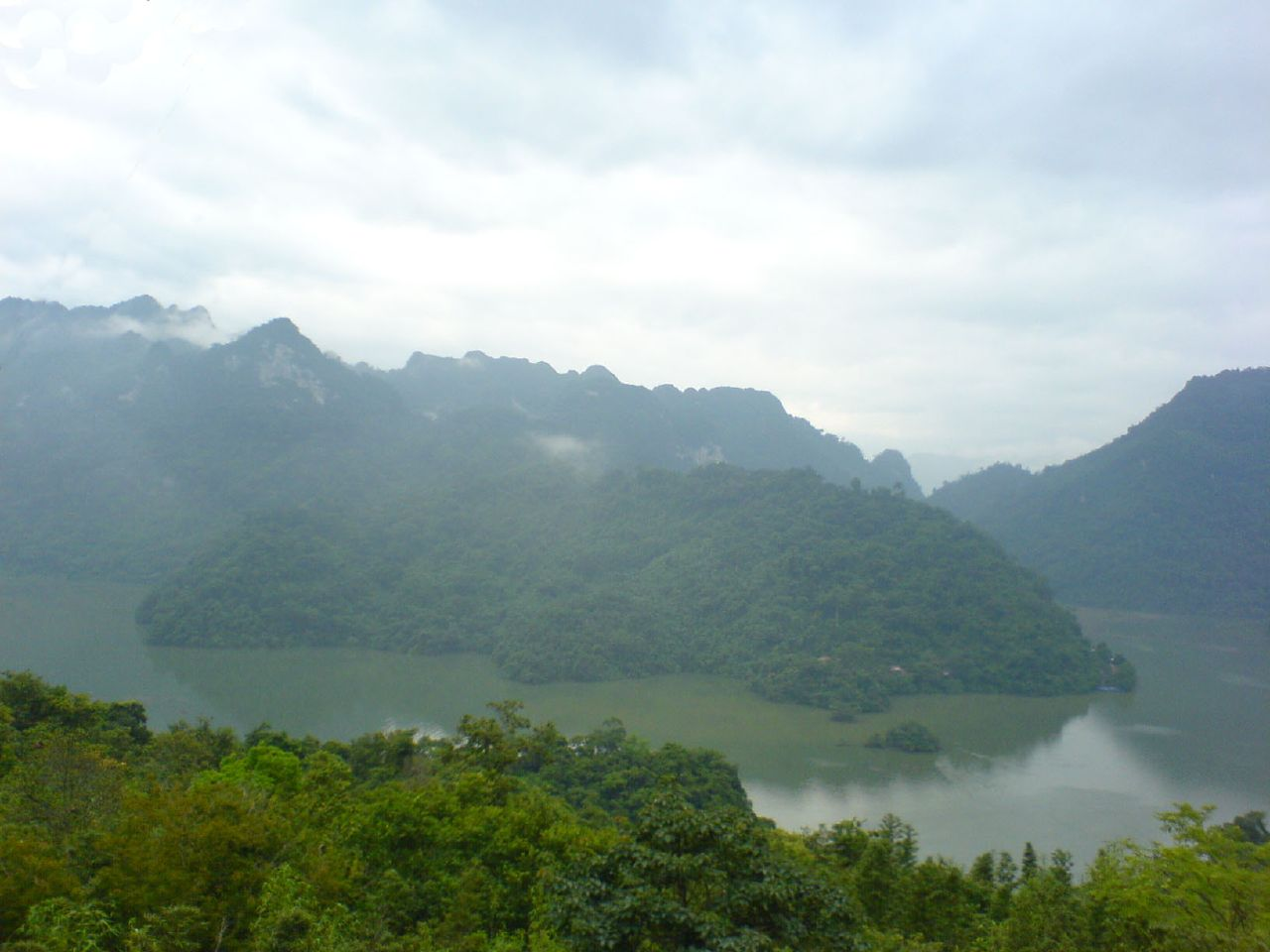
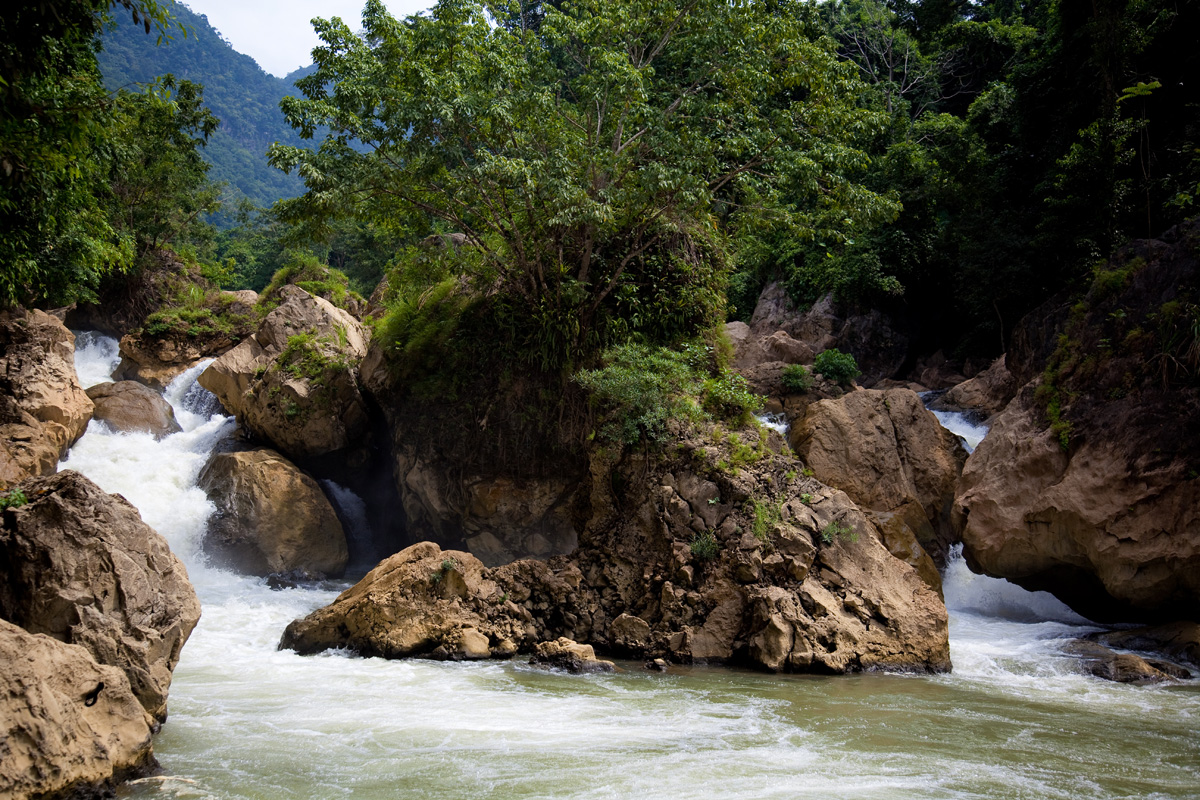
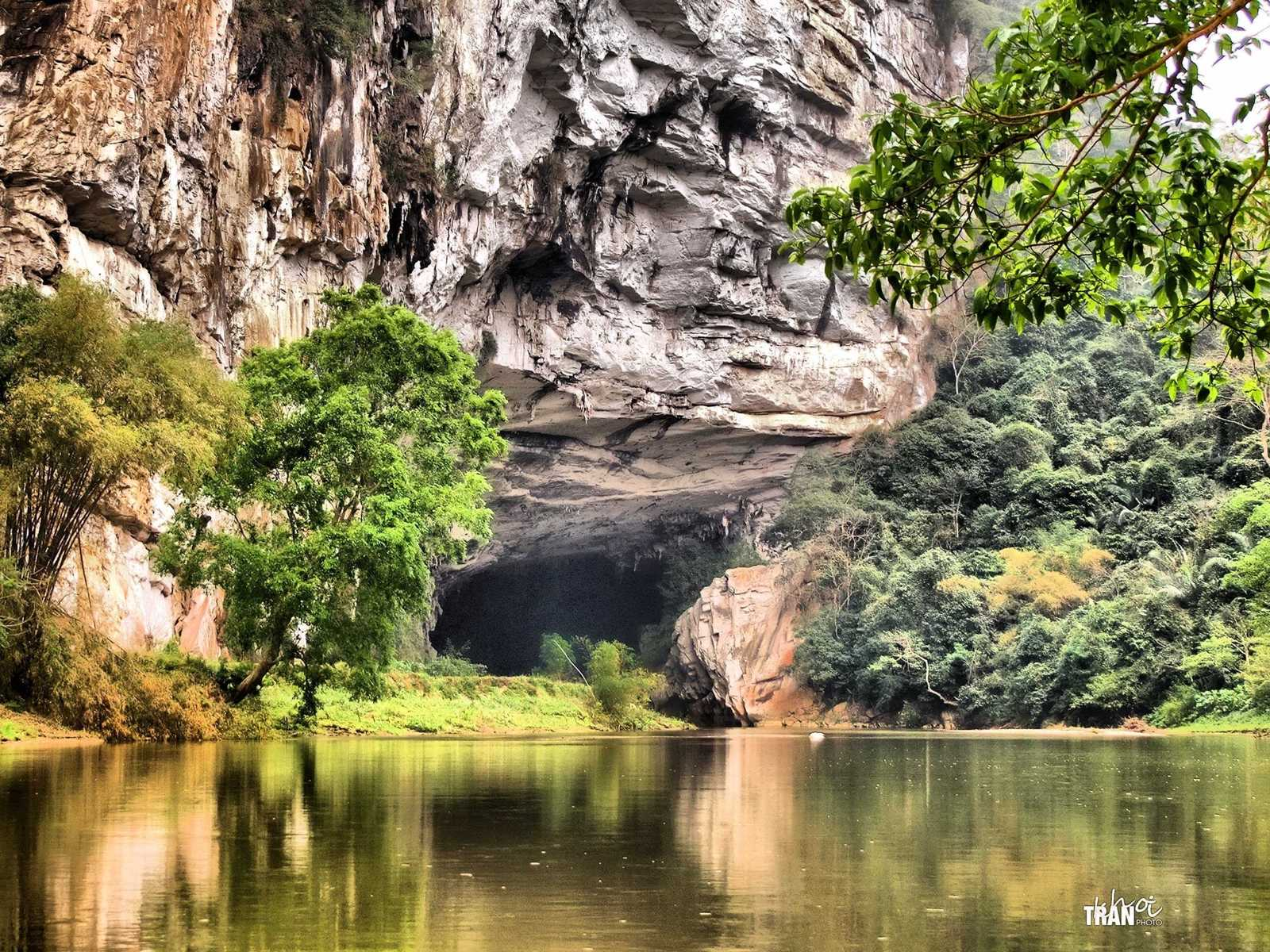
- From top, left to right: Ba Bể Lake, Đầu Đẳng Waterfall, Puông Cave

- Seal

- Location of Bắc Kạn within Vietnam
- Coordinates: 22°10′N 105°50′E
- Country: Vietnam
- Region: Northeast
- Capital: Bắc Kạn
- Subdivision: 1 city, 7 rural districts

Government
  - Type: Province
  - Body: Bắc Kạn Provincial People's Council
  - Chairman of People's Council: Phương Thị Thanh
  - Chairman of People's Committee: Nguyễn Long Hải

Area
  - Total: 4,853.25 km^{2} (1,873.85 sq mi)

Population (2025)
  - Total: 365,318
  - Density: 75.2729/km^{2} (194.956/sq mi)

Ethnic groups
  - Tày: 52.58%
  - Dao: 17.86%
  - Vietnamese: 11.98%
  - Nùng: 9.15%
  - Mông: 7.20%
  - Others: 1.23%

GDP
  - Province: VND 9.765 trillion US$ 0.427 billion
- Time zone: UTC+7 (ICT)
- Area codes: 209
- ISO 3166 code: VN-53
- HDI (2020): ▲0.689 (44th)
- Website: www.backan.gov.vn

Bắc Kạn, sometimes misspelled as Bắc Cạn, was a former province of Vietnam. It is located in the Northeast region, due north of the capital Hanoi.

Bắc Kạn is the only town of the province which is the capital of the province and is a municipality. The province covers an area of 4,859.96 km^{2} (1,876.44 mi^{2}) and as of 2019 it had a population of 313,905 people. It is a mountainous terrain with rich natural resources of minerals and forests. It has numerous mountains, rivers and lakes which are very scenic. Ba Bể National Park and Ba Bể Lake lie within its borders.

On June 12, 2025, Bắc Kạn was incorporated into Thái Nguyên province.

== Etymology ==
The name Bắc Kạn is derived from the Sino-Vietnamese Bắc, meaning north, and the native Vietnamese Kạn, meaning arid; Bắc Kạn is rendered in chữ Hán-Nôm as 北𣴓(氵+件).

== Geography ==
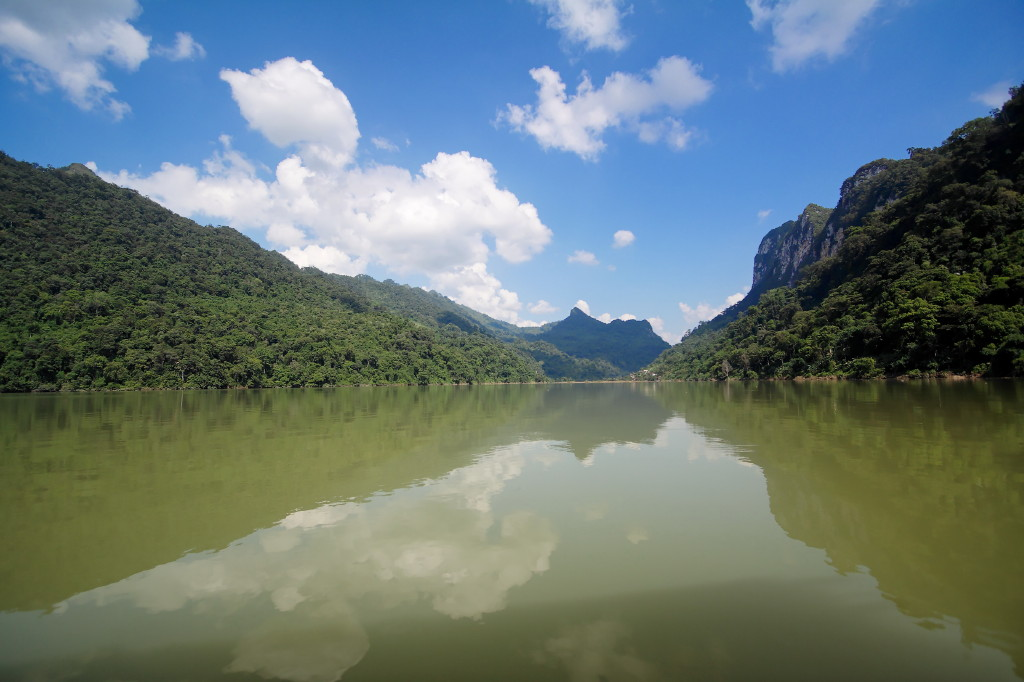
Ba Bể Lake

The province is in the northeast midland mountainous area of Vietnam. Its terrain has the highest altitude among the 11 provinces of the region. Forest area dominates more than 95% of the province. The remainder is available for agricultural and other uses. Due to this rugged and forested topography, development of water resources has been limited resulting in exploitation of its forest resources; this has caused degradation of the forests.

The topography is highly variable, varying from 1,640 metres (5,380 ft) (highest point in the Khie Thiouing mountains in the province) to the lowest point of 40 metres (130 ft) in the Chợ Mới District. There are numerous rivers and streams flowing through the province, each with small catchment areas. However, most of them have steep slopes and short lengths.

Out of the total population, 83% are dependent on agriculture.

== Climate ==
The climatic condition of the province is typically tropical monsoonal, which exhibits two distinct seasons — the rainy season from May to October accounting for about 88-90% of the annual rainfall and dry climatic conditions between November and April. This results in water shortage conditions during the dry months.

== Demographics ==
According to the General Statistics Office of the Government of Vietnam, the population of Bắc Kạn Province, as of 2021, was 320,039 with 71,347 people residing in urban areas compared to 248,692 people residing in rural areas. with a density of 65 persons per km^{2} over a total land area of 4,859.4 square kilometres (1,876.2 mi^{2}). It is the least populated province in Vietnam. The male population during this period was 160,036 while the female population was 153,869. The rural population was 248,773 against an urban population of 65,132 (about 26% of the rural population). The main ethnic groups in the province in decreasing number, are ethnic Kinh, Tày, Nùng and Dao.

== Administrative divisions ==
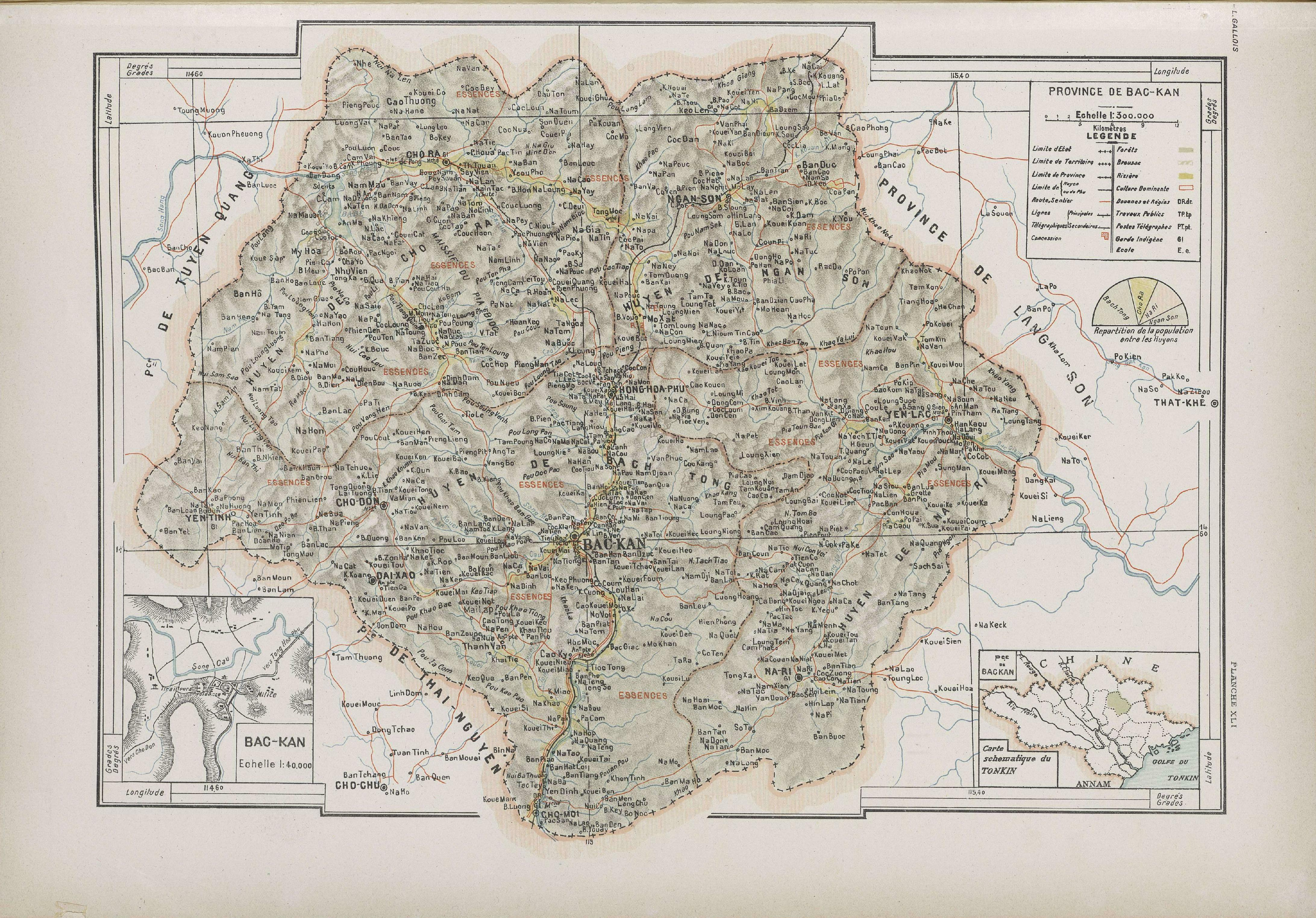
Map of Bac Kan province in 1909

Bắc Kạn is subdivided into eight district-level sub-divisions:

- 7 districts:
  - Ba Bể
  - Bạch Thông
  - Chợ Đồn
  - Chợ Mới
  - Na Rì
  - Ngân Sơn
  - Pác Nặm
- 1 district-level town:
  - Bắc Kạn (capital)

They are further subdivided into six commune-level towns (or townlets), 112 communes, and four wards.

=== Table of local government divisions ===
Name	Division type	Population (2003)	Area (km^{2})	Towns (huyện lỵ or thị trấn) (bold) and communes (xã)
Bắc Kạn	Township (thị xã)	29,227 (2007)	131.95	Wards (phường): Nguyễn Thị Minh Khai, Đức Xuân, Sông Cầu, Phùng Chí Kiên. Communes: (xã): Huyền Tụng, Dương Quang, Nông Thượng, Xuất Hóa
Ba Bể District	District (huyện)	47,910	678	Chợ Rã, Mỹ Phương, Đồng Phúc, Hoàng Trĩ, Quảng Khê, Yến Dương, Chu Hương, Địa Linh, Thượng Giáo, Khang Ninh, Nam Mẫu, Cao Thượng, Cao Trĩ, Phúc Lộc, Bành Trạch, Hà Hiệu
Bạch Thông District	District (huyện)	31,585	546	Phủ Thông, Phương Linh, Vi Hương, Tú Trĩ, Lục Bình, Đôn Phong, Dương Phong, Quang Thuận, Hà Vị, Quân Bình, Cẩm Giàng, Tân Tiến, Sĩ Bình, Vũ Muộn, Cao Sơn, Nguyên Phúc, Mỹ Thanh
Chợ Đồn District	District (huyện)	49,296	913	Bằng Lũng, Bình Trung, Yên Nhuận, Nghĩa Tá, Lương Bằng, Phong Huân, Yên Mỹ, Đại Sảo, Bằng Lãng, Đông Viên, Rã Bản. Phương Viên, Ngọc Phái, Yên Thượng, Yên Thịnh, Bản Thi, Quảng Bạch, Bằng Phúc, Tân Lập, Đồng Lạc, Xuân Lạc, Nam Cường
Chợ Mới District	District (huyện)	37,665	606	Chợ Mới, Quảng Chu, Yên Đĩnh, Như Cố, Bình Văn, Yên Hân, Yên Cư, Thanh Bình, Nông Hạ, Nông Thịnh, Cao Kỳ, Tân Sơn, Hòa Mục, Thanh Vận, Thanh Mai, Mai Lạp
Na Rì District	District (huyện)	38,833	834	Yên Lạc, Đồng Xá, Liêm Thủy, Xuân Dương, Dương Sơn, Quang Phong, Hảo Nghĩa, Cư Lễ, Hữu Thác, Côn Minh, Văn Minh, Ân Tình, Lam Sơn, Kim Lư, Lương Thành, Lạng San, Kim Hỷ, Lương Thượng, Văn Học, Lương Hạ, Cường Lợi, Vũ Loan
Ngân Sơn District	District (huyện)	29,509	644.4	Ngân Sơn, Hương Nê, Lãng Ngâm, Thuần Mang, Thượng Quan, Đức Vân, Vân Tùng, Trung Hòa, Cốc Đán, Thượng Ân, Bằng Vân
Pác Nặm District	District (huyện)	26,476	474	Ba Bể, Bằng Thành, Nhạn Môn, Công Bằng, Giáo Hiệu, Bộc Bố, Xuân La, Cổ Linh, An Thắng, Cao Tân, Nghiên Loan

== Economy ==
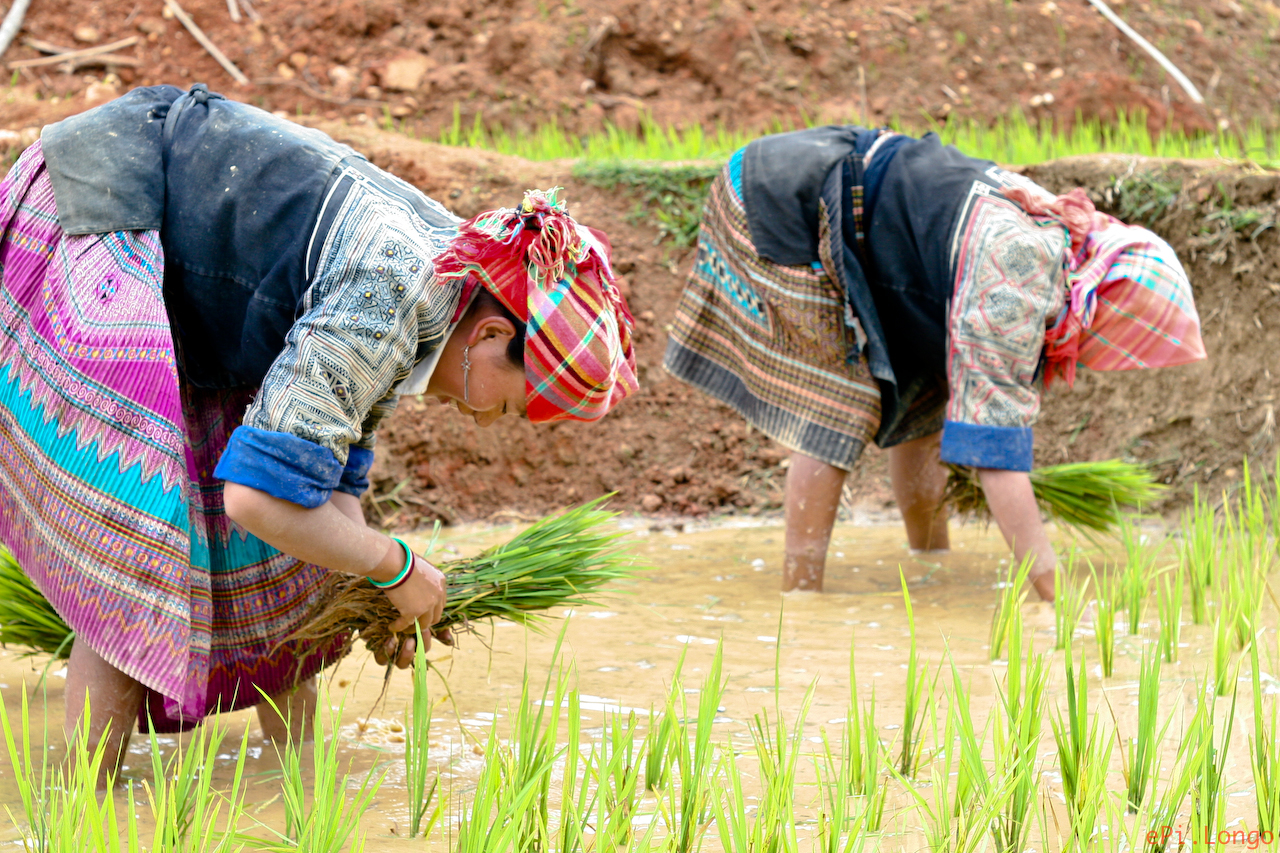
Agriculture operations in the province

Bắc Kạn's economy is centred on mining, forest products, agriculture and some degree of tourism offered by its mountains, lakes and the national park. Some statistics related to the economy of the province are the following.

In 2008, there were only 10 farms as against the national number of 120,699 farms.

The province's agricultural output produce in 2008, at constant 1994 prices, was worth 406.3 billion đồngs against the national value of 156,681.9 billion đồngs.

The province produced 151,800 tonnes of cereals as against the national production of 43.68 million tonnes, in 2008.

The per capita production of cereals in the district was 491.4 kg as against the national figure of 501.8 kg, in 2007.

In 2007, the industrial output of the province was a meagre 376.5 billion đồngs against the national output of 1.47 million billion đồngs.

=== Water resources development ===
The limited water resources development in the province are managed by the communes through better water management practices (government supported initiatives), such as water users associations both for domestic water use and agricultural operations. Irrigation systems developed, though often of temporary nature, in many communes. Participatory management practices adopted since the 1990s have resulted in a greater realization by the farmers that they can play a positive role in the development of irrigation systems in their region for their own benefit. This system has ensured more efficient water delivery to the fields and is reported to have increased the cropping area by 15% and yield levels by 20%. This has resulted in improved economic and living conditions for the farmers.

== Attractions ==
The province generates tourism, with the mountains, rivers, and lakes of Bắc Kạn being considered quite scenic, especially Ba Bể Lake (part of Ba Bể National Park).

=== Ba Bể lake ===
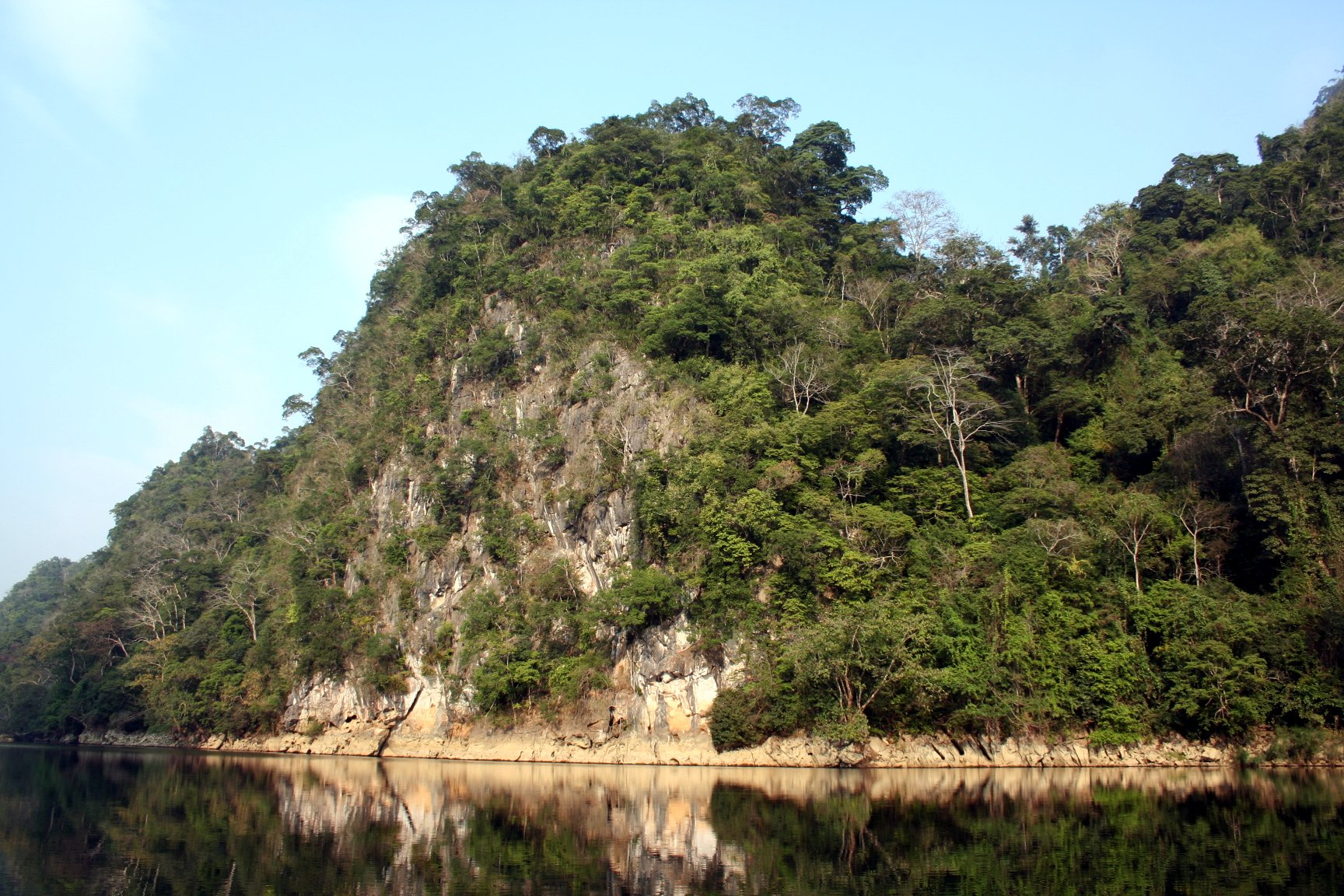
Karst limestone formations on the banks of Ba Bể lake

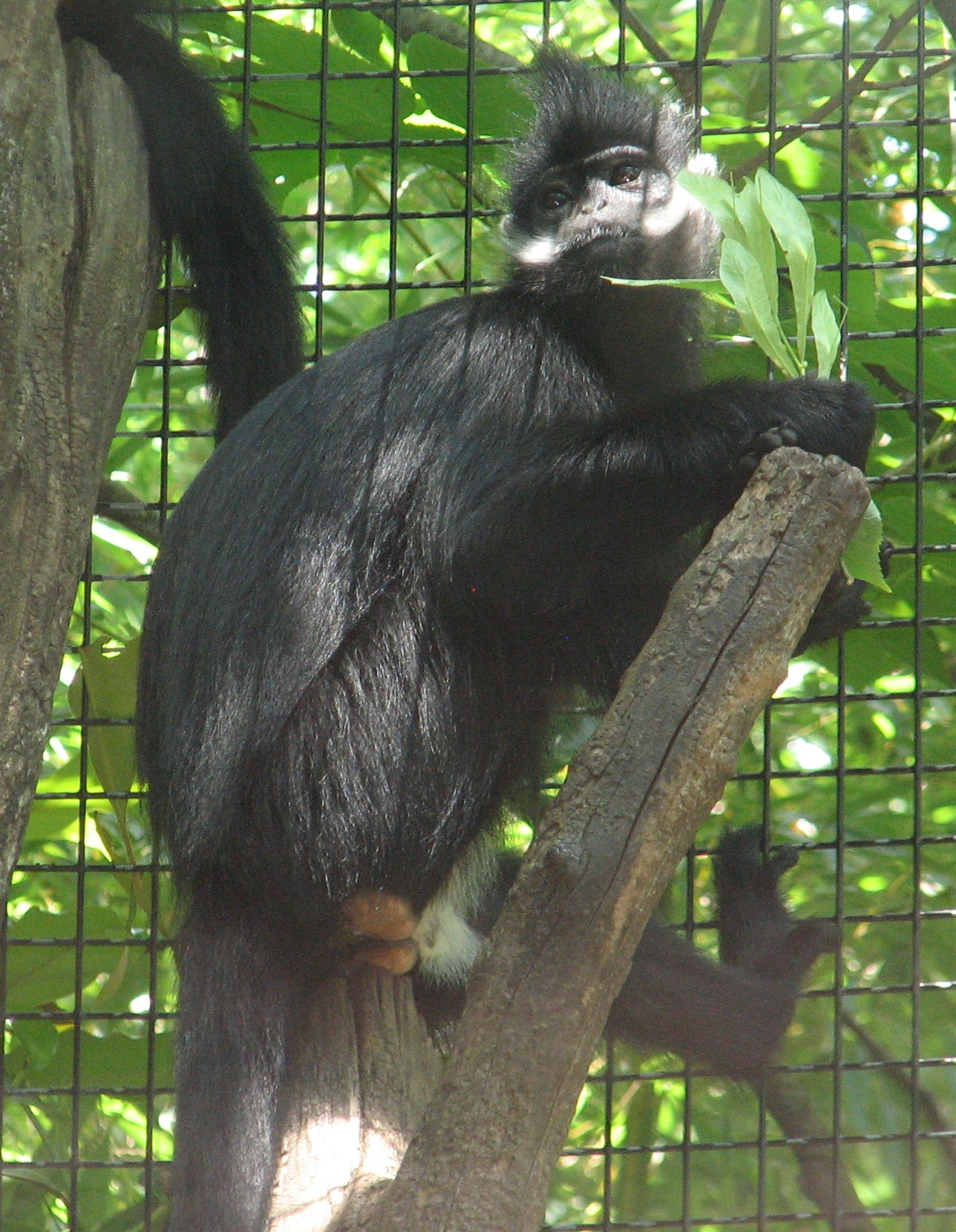
Francois langur

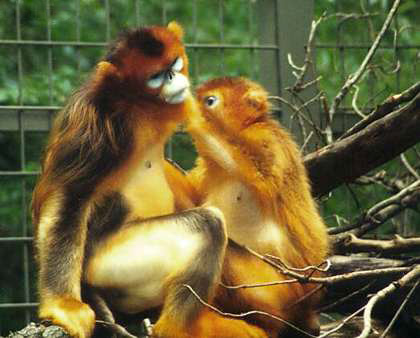
Snub-nosed monkey in the reserve area

Ba Bể Lake located at an altitude of 178 metres (584 ft), in the midst of the Ba Bể National Park has a water spread area of 500 ha bounded within geographic coordinates of (22.233°N 105.566°E) and (22.5166°N 105.733°W). The lake's water stretch is over 8 kilometres (5.0 mi) (from north to south) with a width of 800 metres (2,600 ft)(average). The depth of the lake is from 20–25 metres (66–82 ft) to 35 metres (115 ft). The bed of the lake is uneven with submerged mounts and also limestone islets. The details of the lake have been submitted for UNESCO recognition under the Criteria: (viii)(ix), Category: Natural Submitted by the Ministry of Culture and Information - Government of Vietnam. It is the biggest natural lake in Vietnam, formed in the Chợ Rã-Ba Bể-Chợ Đồn karstic or "Karst" low-lying terrain in the northern midlands. Its formation is attributed to the raising mass formation “from the destruction of South East Asia continental mass at the end of Cambrian era, around 200 million years ago”. As opposed to similar karstic lakes in the world, it retains its full storage all through the year. The Government of Vietnam has also notified the lake as a forest preserve and a techno-economic study was instituted as part of the National Park Conservation programme.

The lake and its environs have rich biodiversity of flora and fauna. Among the flora recorded are 417 species of trees, several species of orchids and species of medicinal plants; 179 species of phytoplankton belonging to Chlorophyta, Cyanophyta, Bacillariophyta, Euglenophyta, Pyrrophyta and Chrysophyta have been observed in the lake as well. The faunal species recorded are of terrestrial, aquatic and flying varieties. These are 319 species of animals, out which 42 species are recorded in Vietnam's Red Book with 3 endemic animal species; the endemic species are the gibbon (snub nose), bamboo-thread and red algae. 106 species of fish recorded in the lake consist of 61 genera, 17 families and 5 orders.

The three lakes, also called the Slam Pe in the local Tày ethnic language, that form Ba Bể lake are called the Pé Lầm, Pé Lù, and Pé Lèng; all linked as one waterbody. The lake's central part is contracted while its outer two parts are wider. The lake's hilly catchment drains 3 rivers into the lake, namely, the Tả Han, Nam Cường and Chợ Lèng rivers from south and west and is drained by the Năng River flowing to the north. The lake water is very clear with blue colour, and it is a flowing lake with a velocity maintained by controls at 0.5 metres per second (1.6 ft/s). The lake acts as a flood absorption reservoir during the high flow stages of the Năng River when reverse flow occurs from the river into the lake, preventing flooding in the Năng, Gâm and Lô river deltas. The Năng River flows southwards, eventually joining the Lô River in southern Tuyên Quang province, before debouching in the Red River west of Hanoi.

=== Ba Bể National Park ===
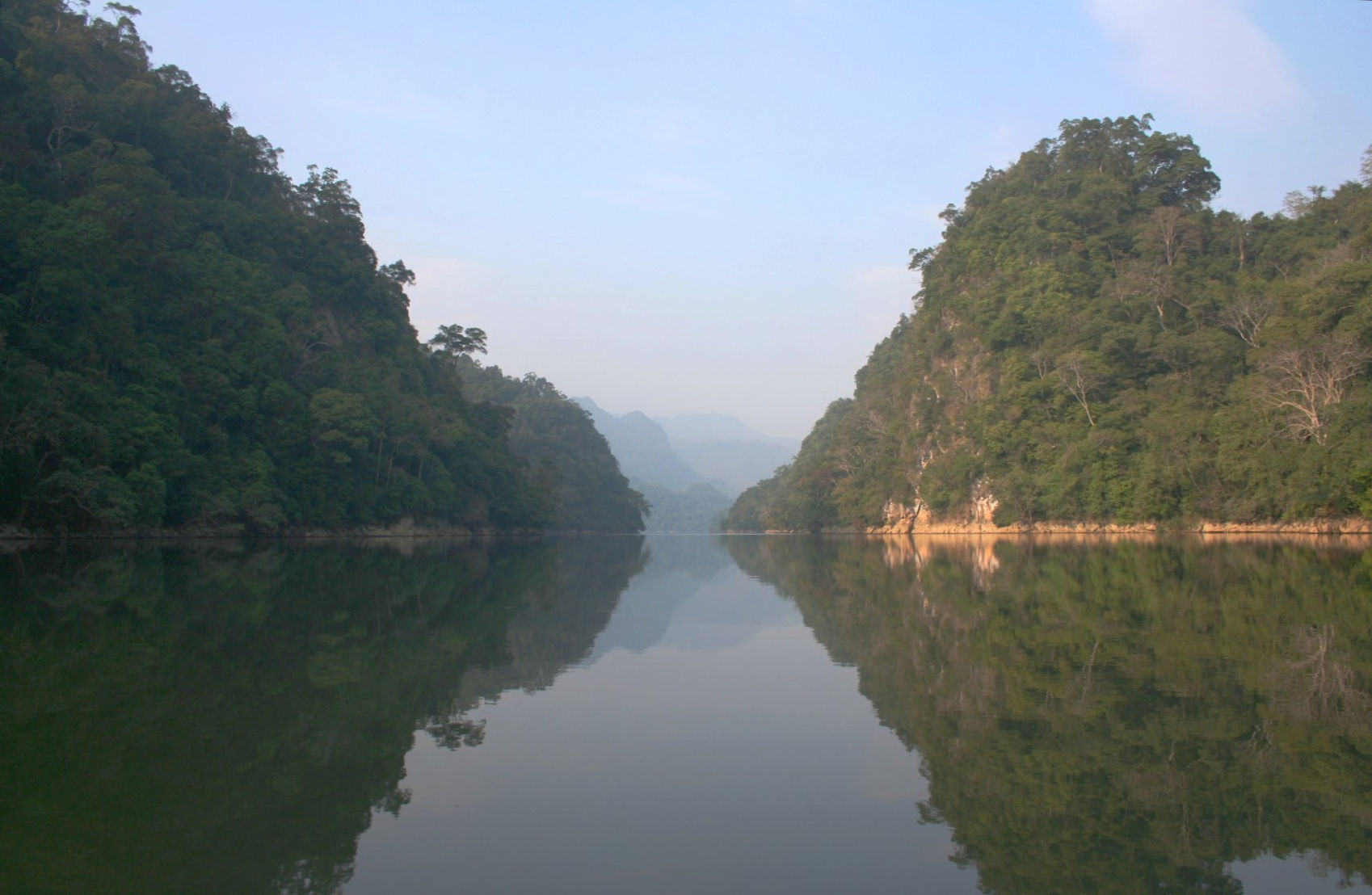
The narrow central part of the Ba Bể Lake in the dry season.

Ba Bể National Park, established in 1992, covers an area of 100.48 square kilometres (38.80 mi^{2}), delimited within geographical coordinates of 22°24′19″N 105°36′55″E. It was set up to protect the Ba Bể Lake along with its surrounding limestone and lowland evergreen forests. The South-West valley of Phiabyior Range of the park has mountain peaks with an elevation range of 517–1,525 m. The reserve forest has two main types of forest vegetation namely the limestone and lowland evergreen forests. The limestone forest, the larger of the two types in the reserve has steep limestone slopes with shallow soil cover. The forest species recorded are mostly Burretiodendron hsienmu and Streblus tonkinensis. The other type is the lowland evergreen forest shallow slopes with a thicker mantle of soils. It has a rich ground flora with a higher diversity of tree species.

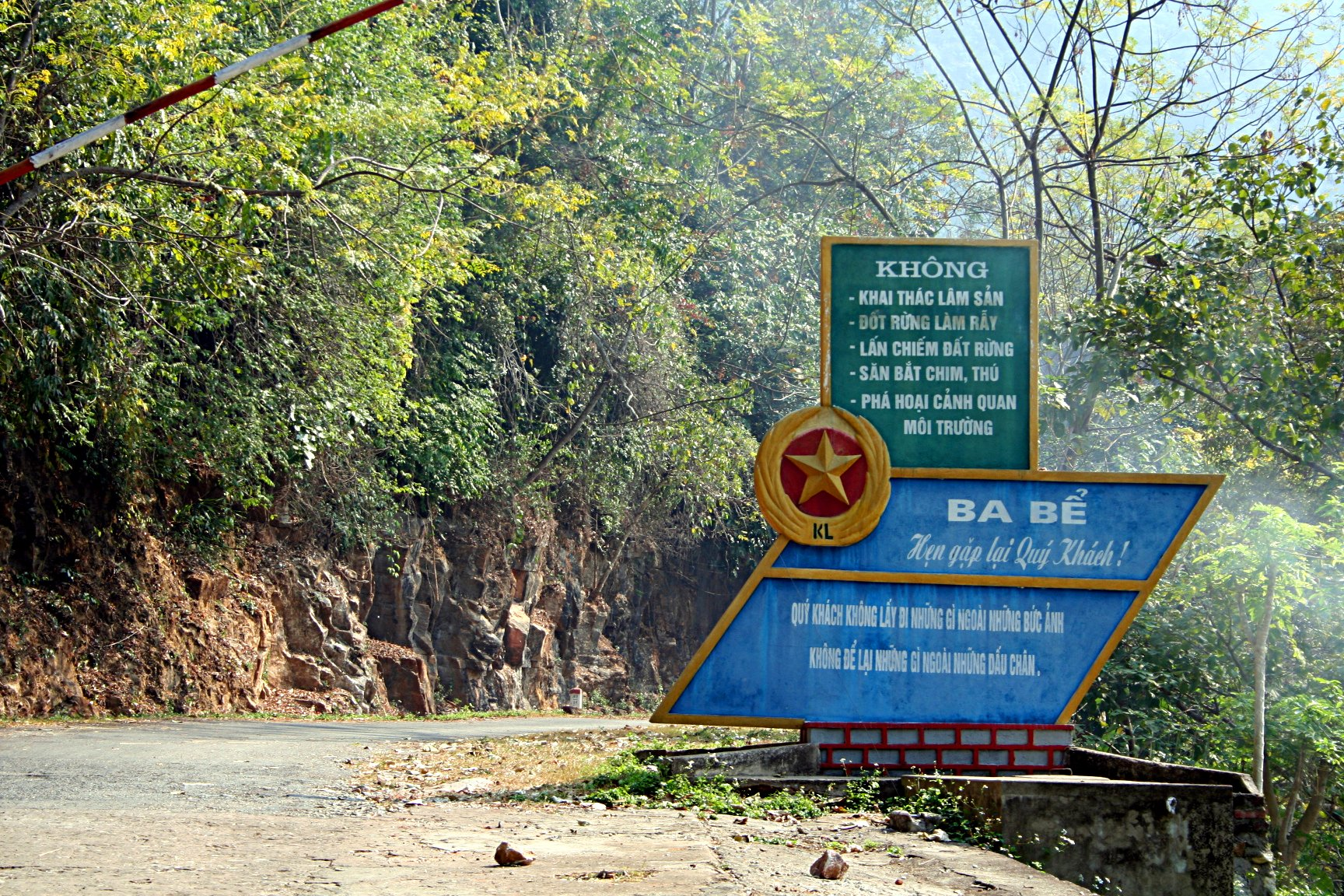
Park sign near the lake management station

There are 65 mammal species in the park. The prominent ones are Owston's civet (Chrotogale owstoni; globally vulnerable), Francois' leaf monkey (Trachypithecus francoisi) and Tonkin snub-nosed monkey (Rhinopithecus avunculus; globally critically endangered). The other species include Chinese pangolin (Manis pentadactyla), slow loris (Nycticebus coucang), rhesus macaque, stump-tailed macaque, François' langur, Asian black bear, European otter, Asian golden cat, mainland serow, red giant flying squirrel, particolored flying squirrel (Hylopetes alboniger), hairy-footed flying squirrel as well as 27 bat species.

About 330 species of butterfly have been recorded, of which 22 are said to be new. Facilities at the park include an information centre, guest houses, a lake management station, and an ecological research station opened in 2004. The park has 13 villages inhabited by five ethnic groups comprising more than 3,000 people, of which the Tày are the oldest ethnic group (over 2,000 years) and form the majority. The other ethnic groups are Dao, Mong, Nùng and Kinh in descending order by population.

=== Other attractions in the park ===
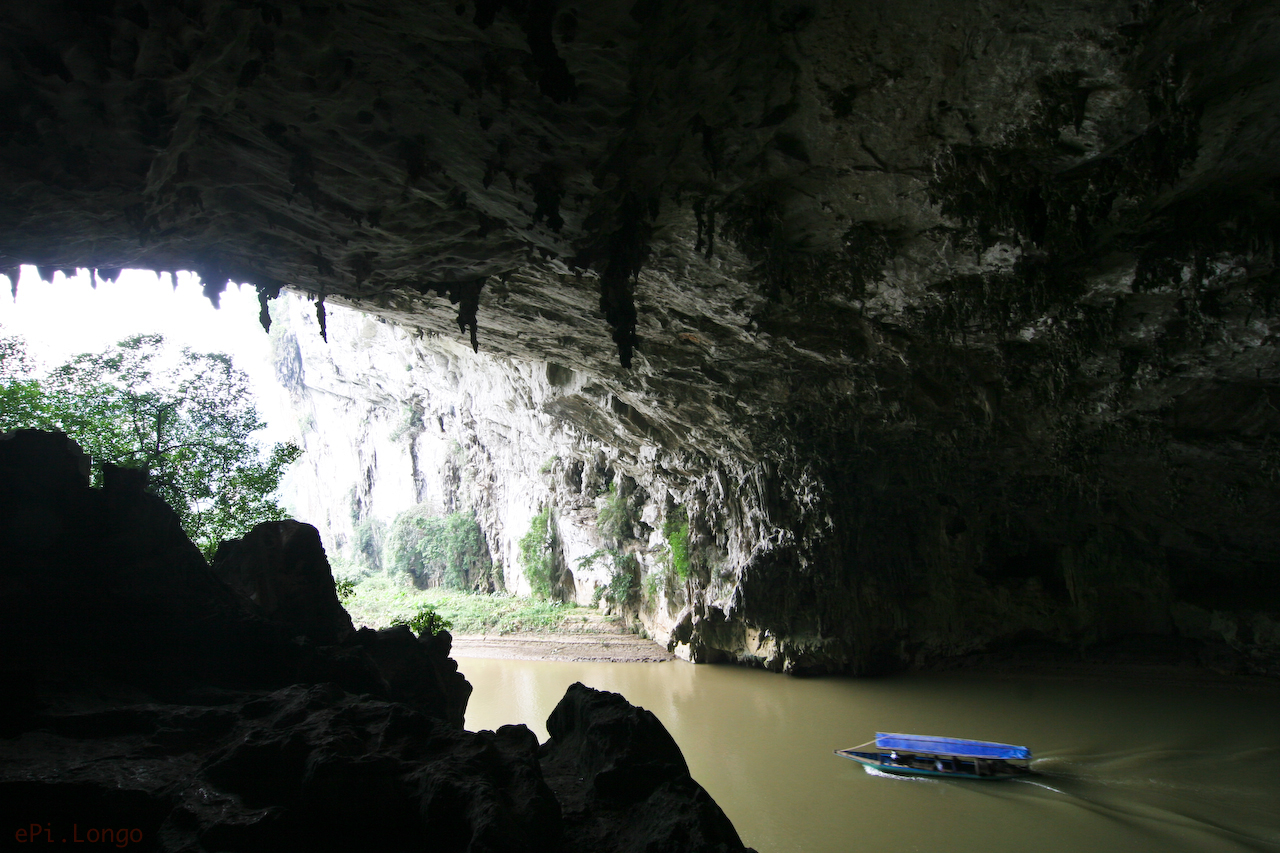
Puong Cave in the Nang River

Puông Cave (Vietnamese: Động Puông) is a large cave in the north of Ba Bể Park through which the Năng River flows. The main cave is up to 50 metres (160 ft) high and about 300 metres (980 ft) long, in limestone formation. The cave is inhabited by a large population of bats which belong to 18 species, out of which three species are identified for plant pollination and scattering seeds.

The "Fairy Pond" is an isolated rock basin filled with clear water that seeps through the surrounding limestone rock. However, the water level in this pond is the same as the Ba Bể Lake. The Dau Dang Waterfall (Vietnamese: Thác Đầu Đẳng) is formed by the Năng River. It consist of a sequence of rapids which stretch over a length of almost 1 kilometre (0.62 mi) as the river flows into Tuyên Quang province.

Widow Island is a small, cone-shaped islet near the centre of the southern part of the lake. According to local legend, the islet was once the home of an old widow who was spared from a flood through divine intervention. Other well known caves include Puông Cave, Nả Poỏng, Ba Cửa Cave, Sơn Dương Cave and the Kim Hỷ nature reserve.
