= Chợ Đồn district =

Coordinates: 22.1637°N 105.5973°E

Chợ Đồn district Huyện Chợ Đồn
- District
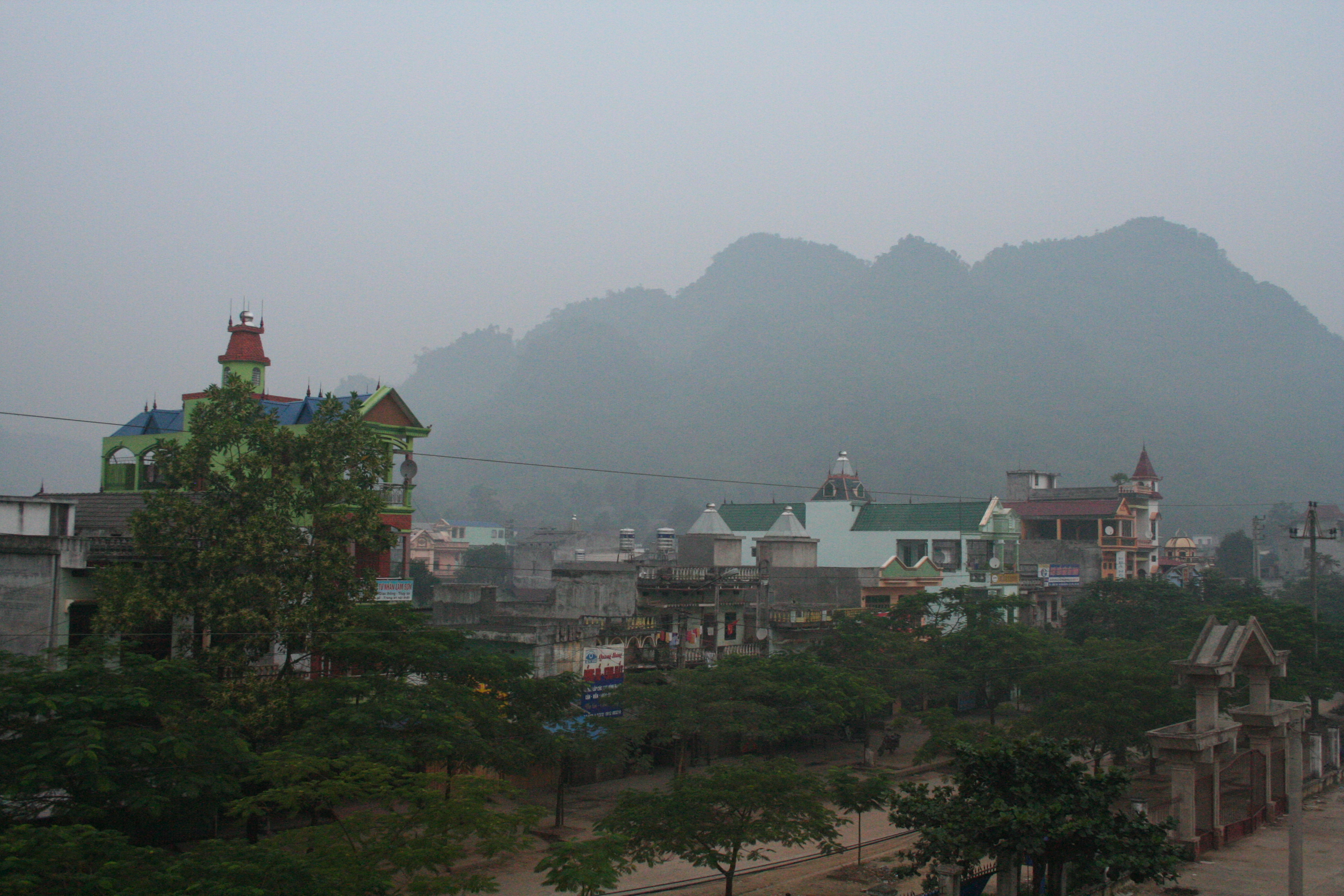
- Bang Lung town in the morning mist
- Interactive map of Chợ Đồn district
- Country: Vietnam
- Province: Bắc Kạn
- Capital: Bằng Lũng

Area
  - Land: 353 sq mi (913 km^{2})

Population (2003)
  - Total: 49,296
- Time zone: UTC+07:00 (Indochina Time)

Chợ Đồn is a former rural district of Bắc Kạn province in the Northeast region of Vietnam. As of 2003 the district had a population of 49,296. The district covers an area of 913 km^{2}. The district capital lies at Bằng Lũng.

== Administrative divisions ==
The district is divided into one township Bằng Lũng (the district capital) and communes:

1. Bình Trung
2. Yên Nhuận
3. Nghĩa Tá
4. Lương Bằng
5. Phong Huân
6. Yên Mỹ
7. Đại Sảo
8. Bằng Lãng
9. Đông Viên
10. Rã Bản
11. Phương Viên
12. Ngọc Phái
13. Yên Thượng
14. Yên Thịnh
15. Bản Thi
16. Quảng Bạch
17. Bằng Phúc
18. Tân Lập
19. Đồng Lạc
20. Xuân Lạc
21. Nam Cường
