= Chợ Mới district, Bắc Kạn =

Coordinates: 21.8809°N 105.7788°E

Chợ Mới district Huyện Chợ Mới
- District
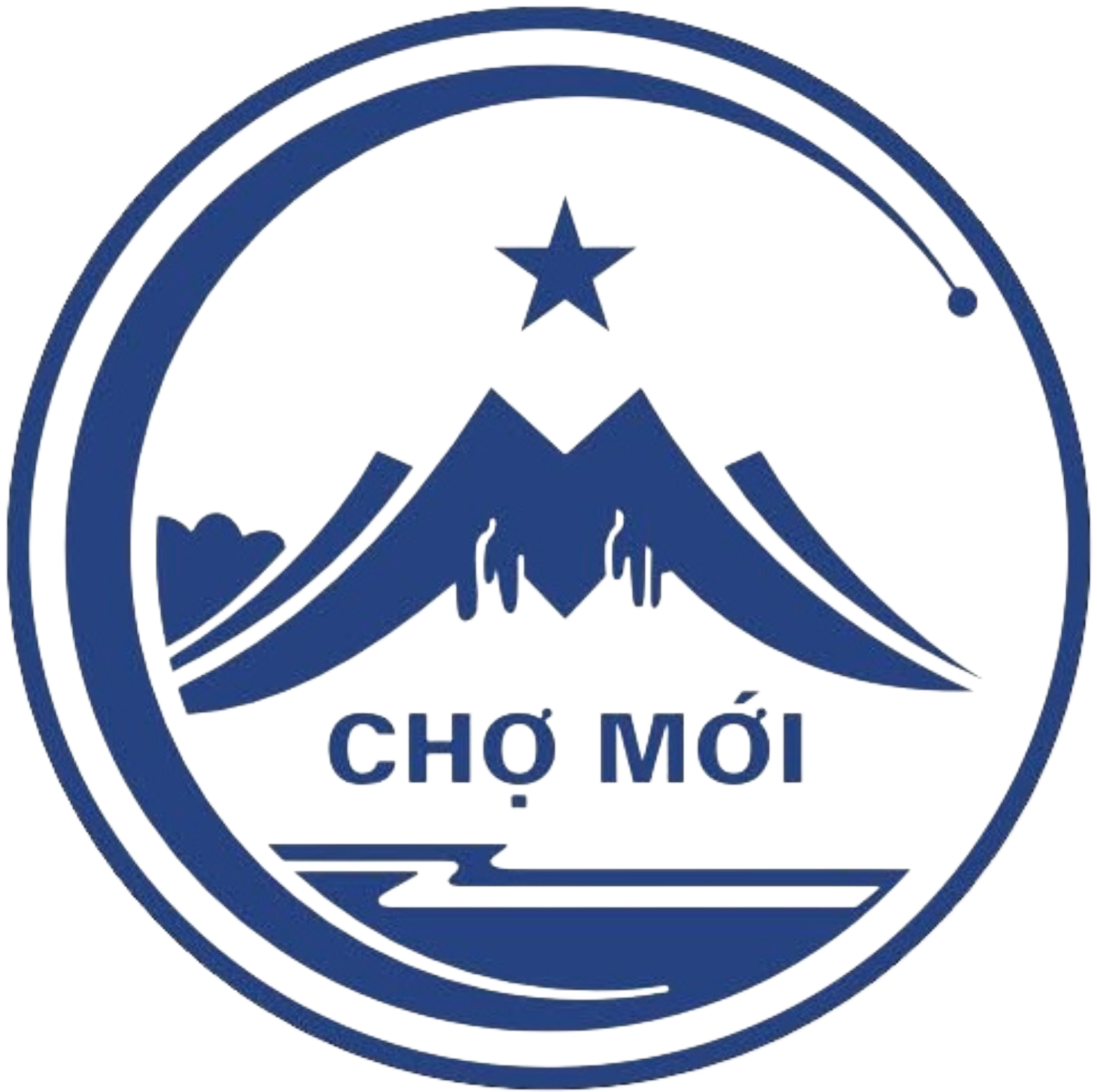
- Seal
- Interactive map of Chợ Mới district
- Country: Vietnam
- Province: Bắc Kạn
- Capital: Chợ Mới

Area
  - Land: 234 sq mi (606 km^{2})

Population (2003)
  - Total: 37,665
- Time zone: UTC+07:00 (Indochina Time)

Chợ Mới is a former rural district of Bắc Kạn province in the Northeast region of Vietnam. As of 2003 the district had a population of 37,665. The district covers an area of 606 km^{2}. The district capital lies at Chợ Mới.

== Administrative divisions ==
The district is divided into one township, Chợ Mới (the district capital) and communes:

1. Quảng Chu
2. Yên Đĩnh
3. Như Cố
4. Bình Văn
5. Yên Hân
6. Yên Cư
7. Thanh Bình
8. Nông Hạ
9. Nông Thịnh
10. Cao Kỳ
11. Tân Sơn
12. Hòa Mục
13. Thanh Vận
14. Thanh Mai
15. Mai Lạp
