= Ngân Sơn district =

Coordinates: 22.417°N 106.000°E

Ngân Sơn district Huyện Ngân Sơn
- District
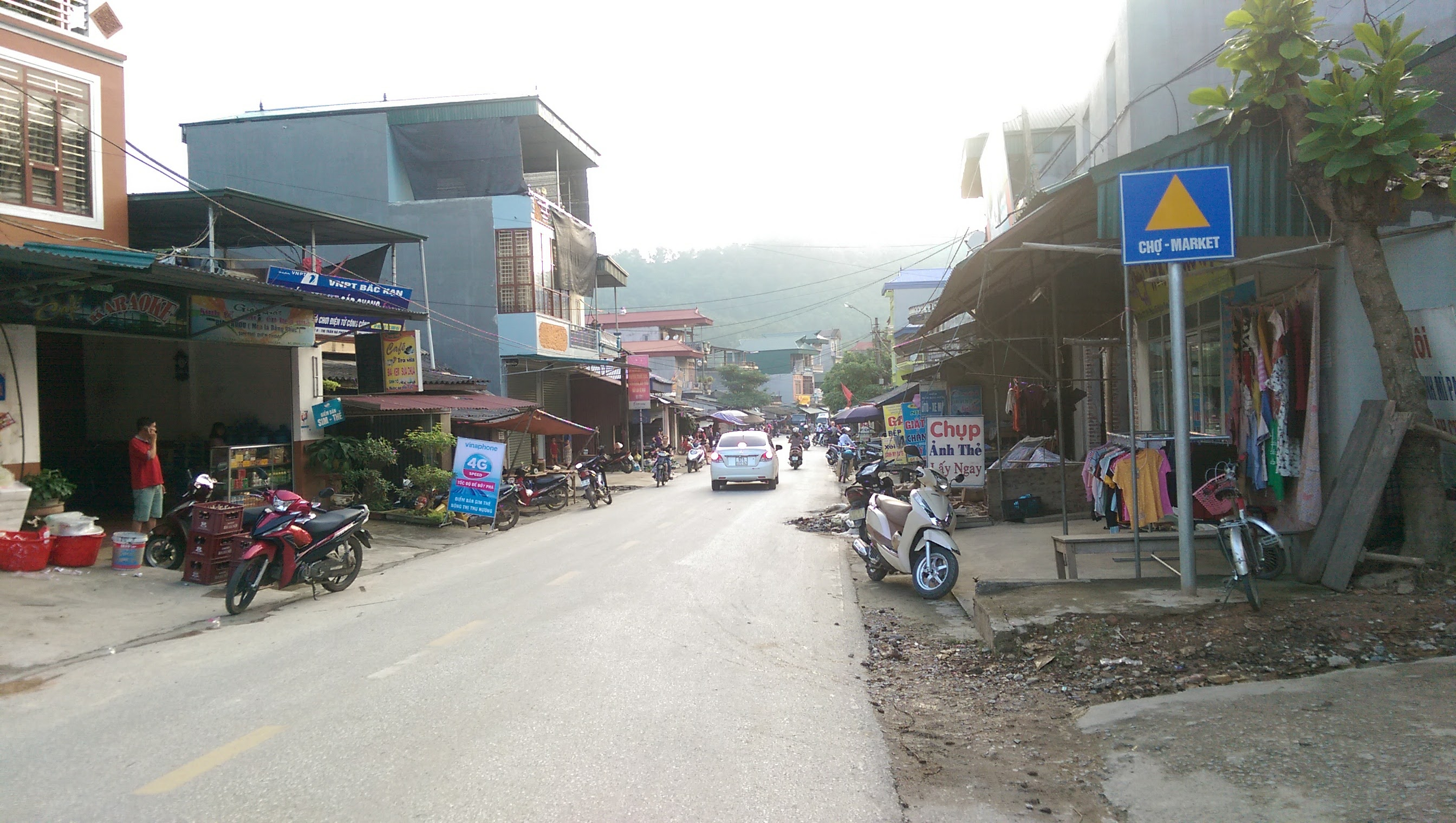
- Nà Phặc town centre
- Interactive map of Ngân Sơn district
- Country: Vietnam
- Province: Bắc Kạn
- Capital: Vân Tùng

Area
  - Land: 248.8 sq mi (644.4 km^{2})

Population (2019 census)
  - Total: 29,269
- Time zone: UTC+07:00 (Indochina Time)

Ngân Sơn is a former rural district of Bắc Kạn province in the Northeast region of Vietnam. As of 2019, the district had a population of 29,269 people. The district covers an area of 644.4 km^{2} (248.8 sq mi). The district capital lies at Vân Tùng commune.

== Administrative divisions ==
The district is subdivided to 11 commune level subdivisions, including the township of Nà Phặc, and the rural communes of: Hương Nê, Lãng Ngâm, Thuần Mang, Thượng Quan, Đức Vân, Vân Tùng (district capital), Trung Hòa, Cốc Đán, Thượng Ân and Bằng Vân.

== Climate ==
Climate data for Ngân Sơn, elevation 566 m (1,857 ft)
Month	Jan	Feb	Mar	Apr	May	Jun	Jul	Aug	Sep	Oct	Nov	Dec	Year
Record high °C (°F)	28.5 (83.3)	33.1 (91.6)	34.3 (93.7)	36.0 (96.8)	36.9 (98.4)	35.9 (96.6)	37.1 (98.8)	35.8 (96.4)	34.9 (94.8)	32.8 (91.0)	31.6 (88.9)	30.1 (86.2)	37.1 (98.8)
Mean daily maximum °C (°F)	16.5 (61.7)	18.0 (64.4)	21.2 (70.2)	25.5 (77.9)	28.7 (83.7)	29.9 (85.8)	30.2 (86.4)	30.3 (86.5)	29.1 (84.4)	26.2 (79.2)	22.6 (72.7)	18.9 (66.0)	24.8 (76.6)
Daily mean °C (°F)	12.5 (54.5)	14.2 (57.6)	17.4 (63.3)	21.4 (70.5)	24.2 (75.6)	25.6 (78.1)	25.7 (78.3)	25.4 (77.7)	24.0 (75.2)	21.2 (70.2)	17.4 (63.3)	13.7 (56.7)	20.2 (68.4)
Mean daily minimum °C (°F)	9.8 (49.6)	11.7 (53.1)	14.9 (58.8)	18.6 (65.5)	21.1 (70.0)	22.7 (72.9)	22.9 (73.2)	22.3 (72.1)	20.8 (69.4)	17.9 (64.2)	14.0 (57.2)	10.3 (50.5)	17.2 (63.0)
Record low °C (°F)	−2.0 (28.4)	0.2 (32.4)	2.8 (37.0)	7.6 (45.7)	11.7 (53.1)	14.0 (57.2)	15.0 (59.0)	15.8 (60.4)	13.2 (55.8)	5.9 (42.6)	1.8 (35.2)	−1.7 (28.9)	−2.0 (28.4)
Average precipitation mm (inches)	32.4 (1.28)	30.4 (1.20)	58.8 (2.31)	102.0 (4.02)	219.7 (8.65)	273.4 (10.76)	332.0 (13.07)	291.7 (11.48)	161.3 (6.35)	92.5 (3.64)	55.2 (2.17)	27.9 (1.10)	1,677.4 (66.04)
Average rainy days	11.1	11.7	14.3	14.2	15.3	18.4	20.7	19.1	13.5	10.2	8.4	7.5	164.3
Average relative humidity (%)	82.0	82.9	83.4	83.0	81.6	83.5	85.4	85.3	83.0	81.4	81.1	80.1	82.7
Mean monthly sunshine hours	62.5	66.8	58.2	96.4	149.9	132.0	144.7	174.2	157.1	127.9	116.5	103.0	1,389.2
Source: Vietnam Institute for Building Science and Technology
