= Na Rì district =

Coordinates: 22.167°N 106.083°E

Na Rì district Huyện Na Rì
- District
- Interactive map of Na Rì district
- Country: Vietnam
- Province: Bắc Kạn
- Capital: Yến Lạc

Area
  - Land: 322 sq mi (834 km^{2})

Population (2019 census)
  - Total: 38,263
  - Density: 119/sq mi (45.9/km^{2})
- Time zone: UTC+07:00 (Indochina Time)

Na Rì is a former rural district of Bắc Kạn province in the Northeast region of Vietnam. As of 2019 the district had a population of 38,263. The district covers an area of 834 km^{2}. The district capital lies at Yến Lạc.

== Administrative divisions ==
The district is divided into one township, Yến Lạc (the district capital), and communes:

1. Đổng Xá
2. Liêm Thủy
3. Xuân Dương
4. Dương Sơn
5. Quang Phong
6. Hảo Nghĩa
7. Cư Lễ
8. Hữu Thác
9. Côn Minh
10. Văn Minh
11. Ân Tình
12. Lam Sơn
13. Kim Lư
14. Lương Thành
15. Lạng San
16. Kim Hỷ
17. Lương Thượng
18. Văn Học
19. Lương Hạ
20. Cường Lợi
21. Vũ Loan
