= Ba Bể district =

Coordinates: 22.417°N 105.750°E

Ba Bể district Huyện Ba Bể
- District
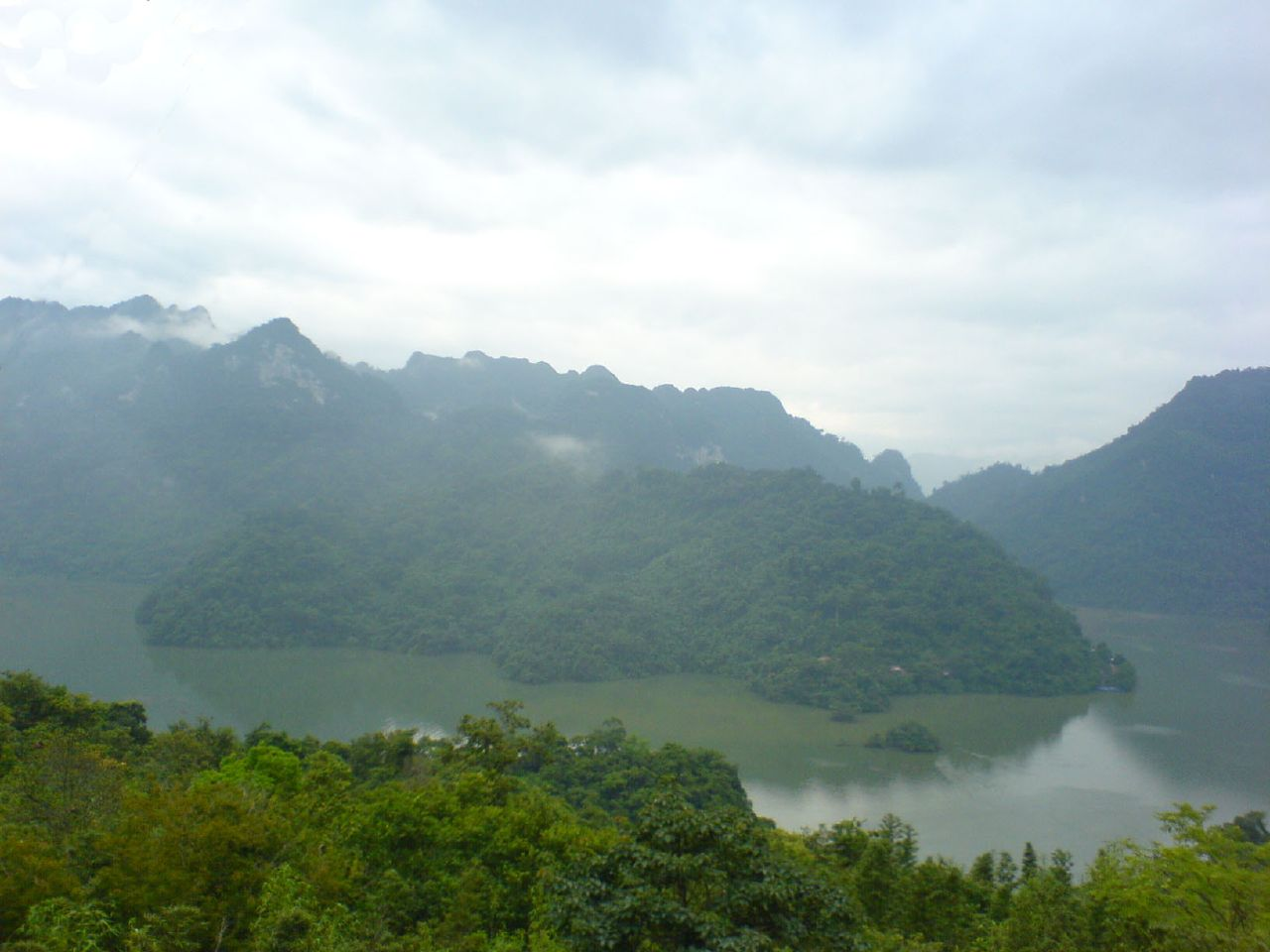
- Ba Bể Lake

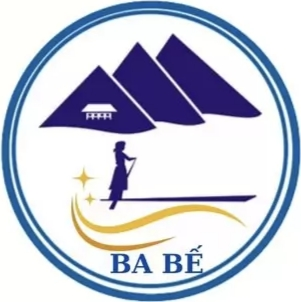
- Seal
- Interactive map of Ba Bể district
- Country: Vietnam
- Province: Bắc Kạn
- Capital: Chợ Rã

Area
  - Land: 262 sq mi (678 km^{2})

Population (2019)
  - Total: 48,325
- Time zone: UTC+07:00 (Indochina Time)

Ba Bể is a former rural district of Bắc Kạn province in the Northeast region of Vietnam. As of 2019 the district had a population of 48,325. The district covers an area of 678 km^{2}. The district town lies at Chợ Rã.

== Administrative divisions ==
The district is divided into one township Chợ Rã, the district town and communes:

1. Mỹ Phương
2. Đồng Phúc
3. Hoàng Trĩ
4. Quảng Khê
5. Yến Dương
6. Chu Hương
7. Địa Linh
8. Thượng Giáo
9. Khang Ninh
10. Nam Mẫu
11. Cao Thượng
12. Cao Trĩ
13. Phúc Lộc
14. Bành Trạch
15. Hà Hiệu

== Climate ==
Climate data for Chợ Rã, Ba Bể district, elevation 210 m (690 ft)
Month	Jan	Feb	Mar	Apr	May	Jun	Jul	Aug	Sep	Oct	Nov	Dec	Year
Record high °C (°F)	31.4 (88.5)	35.2 (95.4)	37.2 (99.0)	39.8 (103.6)	41.5 (106.7)	39.6 (103.3)	39.4 (102.9)	38.9 (102.0)	38.1 (100.6)	36.0 (96.8)	35.2 (95.4)	32.9 (91.2)	41.5 (106.7)
Mean daily maximum °C (°F)	19.5 (67.1)	21.1 (70.0)	24.3 (75.7)	28.5 (83.3)	31.8 (89.2)	32.8 (91.0)	33.0 (91.4)	32.9 (91.2)	31.9 (89.4)	28.9 (84.0)	25.2 (77.4)	21.7 (71.1)	27.7 (81.9)
Daily mean °C (°F)	14.8 (58.6)	16.6 (61.9)	19.8 (67.6)	23.7 (74.7)	26.3 (79.3)	27.7 (81.9)	27.7 (81.9)	27.4 (81.3)	26.1 (79.0)	23.2 (73.8)	19.3 (66.7)	15.7 (60.3)	22.4 (72.3)
Mean daily minimum °C (°F)	12.0 (53.6)	13.8 (56.8)	16.8 (62.2)	20.4 (68.7)	22.8 (73.0)	24.4 (75.9)	24.6 (76.3)	24.4 (75.9)	22.9 (73.2)	20.1 (68.2)	16.2 (61.2)	12.5 (54.5)	19.3 (66.7)
Record low °C (°F)	−0.3 (31.5)	2.9 (37.2)	4.4 (39.9)	9.8 (49.6)	14.3 (57.7)	16.3 (61.3)	18.9 (66.0)	20.1 (68.2)	14.2 (57.6)	9.4 (48.9)	4.1 (39.4)	−0.6 (30.9)	−0.6 (30.9)
Average rainfall mm (inches)	25.1 (0.99)	20.9 (0.82)	44.5 (1.75)	92.5 (3.64)	180.8 (7.12)	229.6 (9.04)	258.4 (10.17)	237.7 (9.36)	127.0 (5.00)	76.6 (3.02)	42.6 (1.68)	20.6 (0.81)	1,356.3 (53.40)
Average rainy days	7.2	7.1	9.2	11.4	14.9	17.9	19.4	18.8	13.6	10.1	8.3	5.8	143.7
Average relative humidity (%)	82.7	81.0	81.0	81.5	81.7	84.1	85.4	85.6	84.5	84.7	84.1	82.9	83.2
Mean monthly sunshine hours	60.9	52.1	64.1	102.2	145.2	139.2	142.8	170.2	153.8	132.2	113.0	95.4	1,371.2
Source: Vietnam Institute for Building Science and Technology

== See also ==
- Ba Bể Lake
- Ba Bể National Park
