= Hua Ma Cave =

Cave in Vietnam

Coordinates: 22.3527°N 105.6782°E

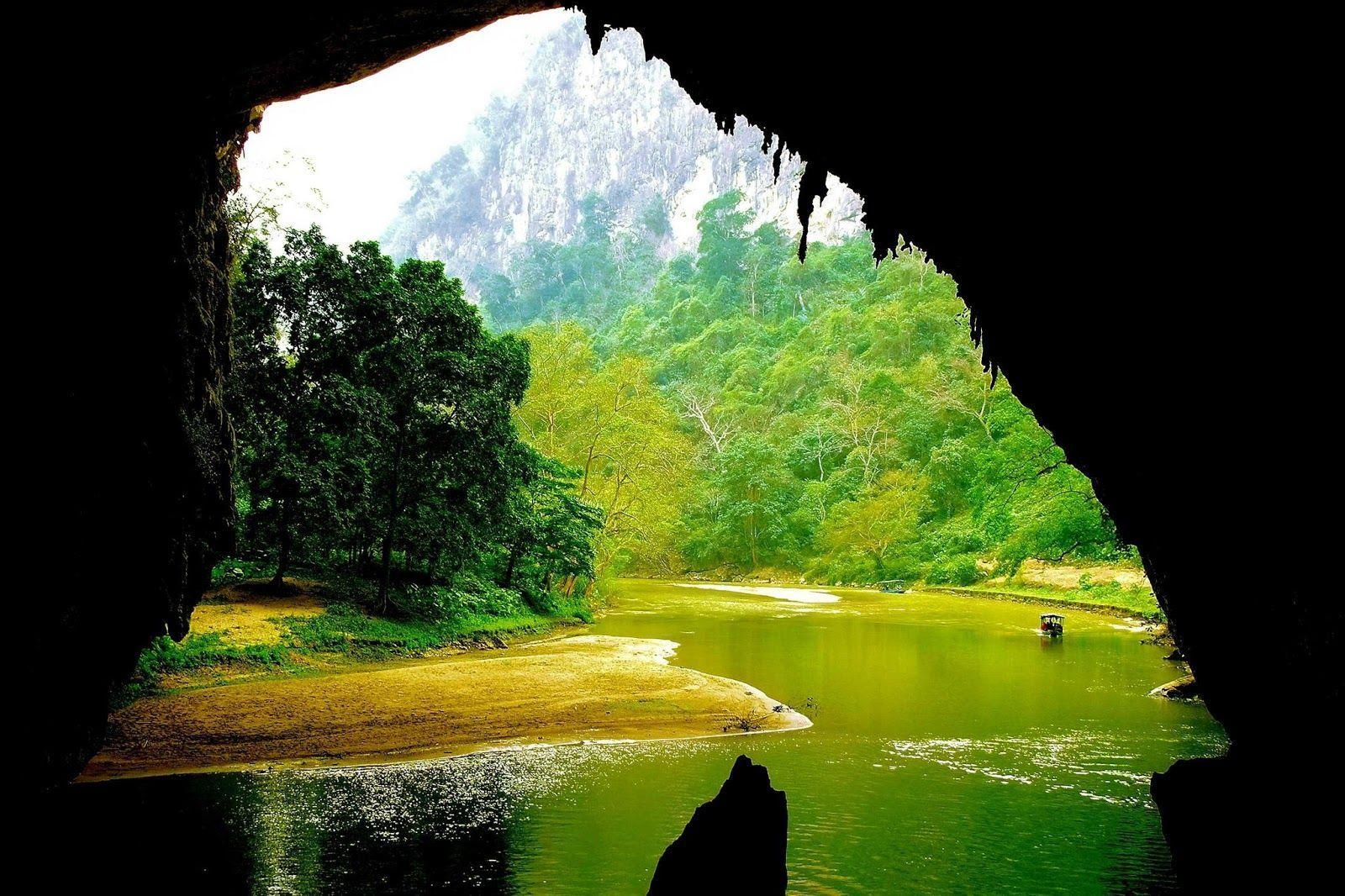
Hua Ma cave

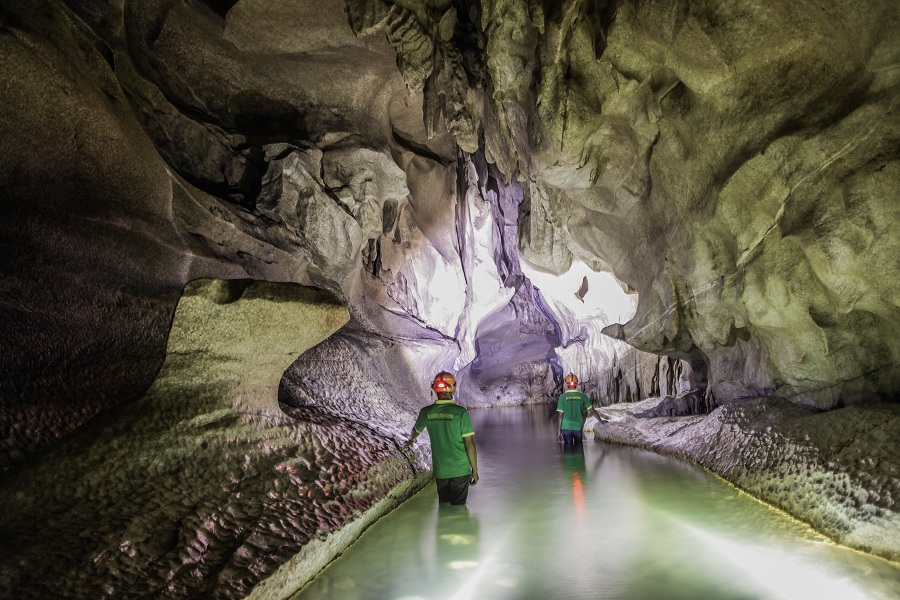
Hua Ma cave

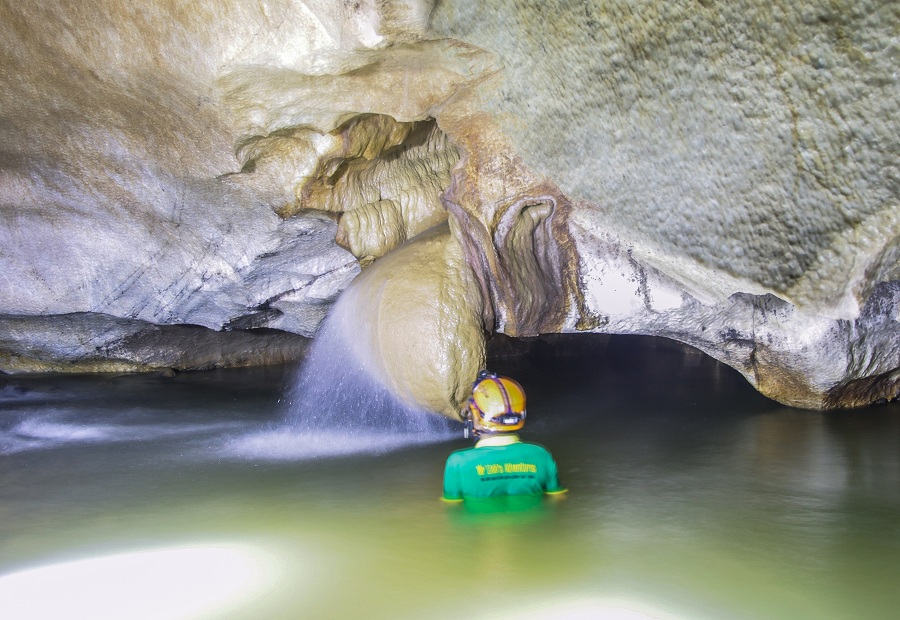
Hua Ma cave

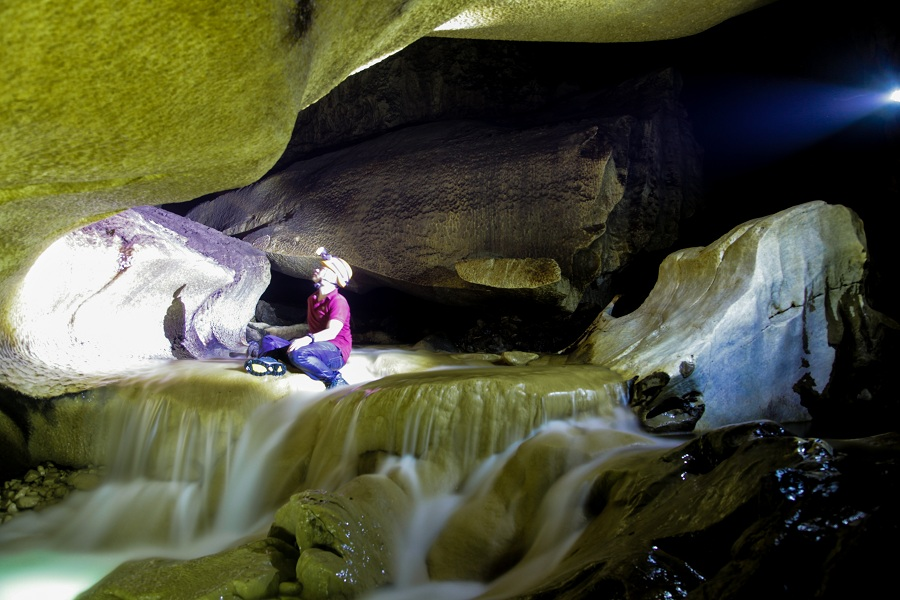
Hua Ma cave

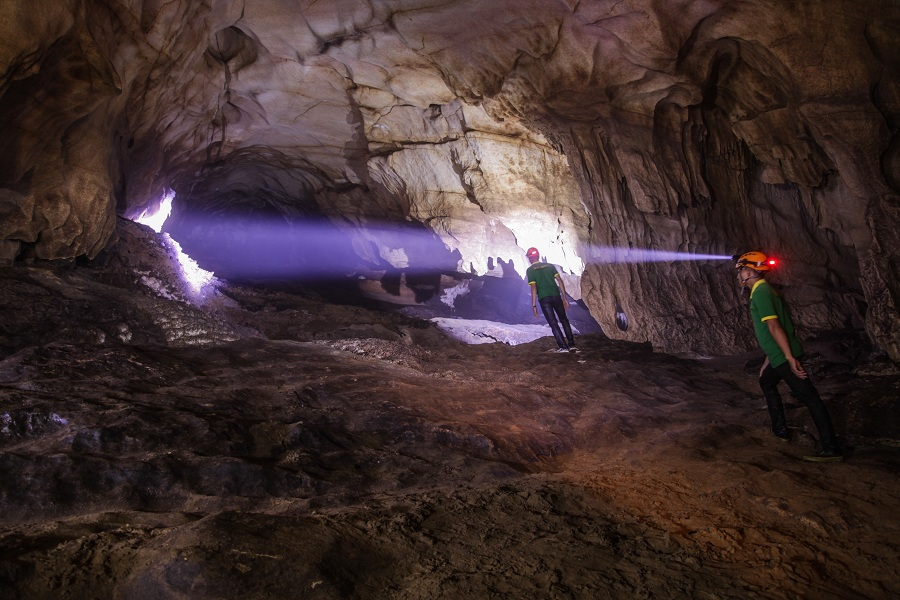
Hua Ma cave

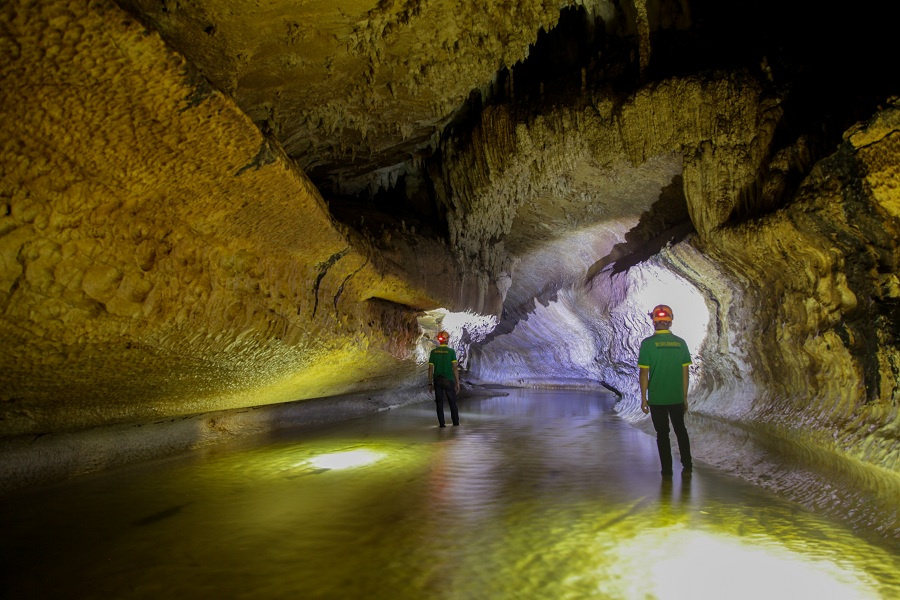
Hua Ma cave

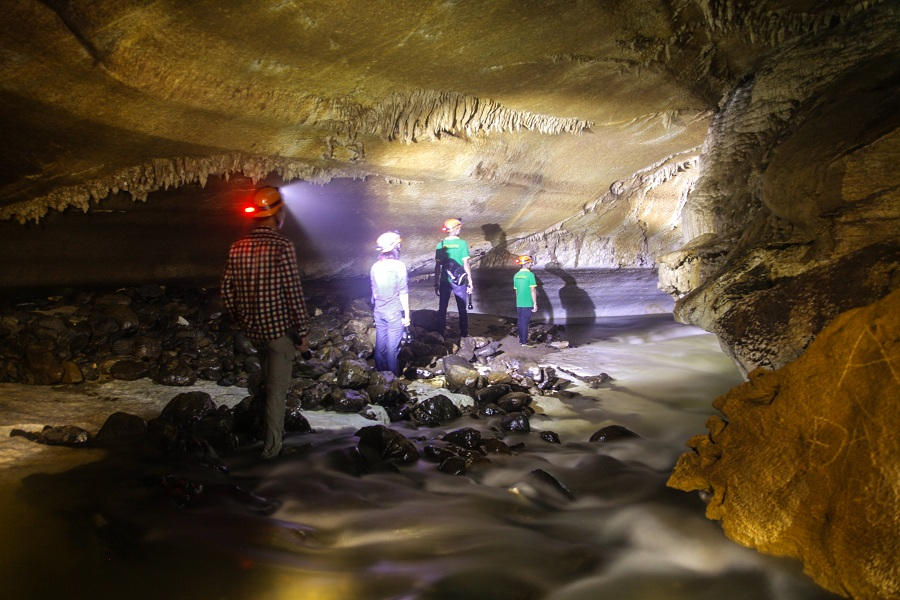
Hua Ma cave

Hua Ma Cave is located within the Ba Bể national park. It is next to the river Lèng and is a part of Pắc Ngòi village, Ba Bể district, Bắc Kạn province. The cave could be found in the middle of the mountain, with an altitude of about 350m above sea level, there is a strange cave deep in the mountain in the south-east direction. Local people called it Ca Po - Hua Mak cave.

Hua Ma cave has a length of over 700m, with a wide and 40–50m high ceiling, containing many walls, stalactites shimmering. Visitors climb up to the mountains for about 300 meters to Hua Ma cave, 3 meters wide, 5 meters high. The surface of the cave is flat, dry, clean, occasionally there are rocky terraces, curving stone like winding terraces. Dozens of large stone columns 10–15m high in the middle of the cave, the hands are hand-carved very delicate like the pillars in ancient temples. Compared to the caves that have been discovered in Vietnam such as Huong Tich, Thien Cung, Phong Nha - Ke Bang, the Hua Mak cave is no worse than the stalactites of stalactites millions of years old. Hua Ma is also known as "Suspension Cave" because it lies in the middle of the mountain, with an entrance to the east and a passageway to the south. The cave looks down into the waters of Ba Be Lake.

From 2003 to 2004, Hua Ma cave was surveyed and put into operation tourism since 2007. Bac Kan province has invested in lighting systems and roads to the cave. Along with Ba Be lake, Pac Ngoi village, Hua Ma cave is determined to form a key tourism complex of Bac Kan province.

== Legend of the cave Huama ==
According to the people living here, the old Forest Ghost is the place where the devil reigns. In the afternoon, the cries from the cave of Hua Ma hope to shock the whole area until late at night, the people in the area no one dared to travel in that time.

On that day a royal general went on a march through here, when it came to the river Leng, it was nearly dark. The horse was about to turn to the side to rest, but strangely, when crossing the Leng River, down to the water, the horse turned his head back, echoing as if signaling something unusual. At the same time from the cave Leo, the howling, the oan soul cry out. Seeing strange things, the officer called the villagers to know that the cry is the soul of the soldiers trapped in the cave, were attacked by the cave door to die but souls are not escaped.

Understanding the situation, the chieftain camp right next to the banks of the river Leng and slaughter horses, horse head to worship heaven and earth. Strangely, when the sacrifice was finished, the inanimate voice of the deceased and then gradually disappear, where over the years have sprung up the stalactites are very special, there are places like stone flowers, there are places like Bodhisattva Avalokitesvara teaches the Tripitaka teacher to go to business, there is a place like a palace, palace in the "Palace". From there it is called "Lèn Pèn" which is Hua Ma or the local dialect called Ngo Ngua Cave means "head of house," to memorize a mysterious and legendary area of land and people here.

== Geographic value ==
Over millions of years, sedimentary rocks have created spectacular stalactites and stalagmites, with many special shapes.
