= Trần Phú (disambiguation) =

Trần Phú (1904 – 1931) was a Vietnamese revolutionary and the first general secretary of the Indochinese Communist Party. Several places in Vietnam are named after him:

- Trần Phú, Hà Nội, a commune of Hanoi
- Trần Phú, Hoàng Mai, a former ward of Hoàng Mai district, Hanoi
- Trần Phú, Bắc Giang, a former ward of Bắc Giang
- Trần Phú, Bình Định, a former ward of Quy Nhơn
- Trần Phú, Hà Giang, a former ward of Hà Giang
- Trần Phú, Hà Tĩnh, a former ward of Hà Tĩnh
- Trần Phú, Hải Dương, a former ward of Hải Dương
- Trần Phú, Quảng Ngãi, a former ward of Quảng Ngãi
- Trần Phú, Quảng Ninh, a former ward of Móng Cái
- Trần Phú, Chương Mỹ, a former commune of Chương Mỹ district, Hanoi
- Trần Phú, Bắc Kạn, a former commune of Na Rì district
- Nông trường Trần Phú, a former town of Văn Chấn district, Yên Bái province
- Tran Phu (Phủ rather than Phú) was also the birth name of an emperor of the Trần dynasty of Dai Viet
- Trần Nghệ Tông (1321–1394) (given name Trần Phủ)
