= Xuân Dương =

Xuân Dương may refer to several places in Vietnam, including:

- Xuân Dương, Hanoi, a rural commune of Thanh Oai District
- Xuân Dương, Bắc Kạn, a rural commune of Na Rì District
- Xuân Dương, Lạng Sơn, a rural commune of Lộc Bình District
- Xuân Dương, Thanh Hóa, a rural commune of Thường Xuân District
