= Quang Phong =

Quang Phong may refer to several places in Vietnam, including:

- Quang Phong, Thái Hòa, a ward of Thái Hòa in Nghệ An Province
- Quang Phong, Bắc Kạn, a commune of Na Rì District
- Quang Phong, Quế Phong, a commune of Quế Phong District in Nghệ An Province
