= Dương Quang =

Dương Quang may refer to several places in Vietnam, including:

- Dương Quang, Hanoi, a rural commune of Gia Lâm District
- Dương Quang, Bắc Kạn, a rural commune of Bắc Kạn city
- Dương Quang, Hưng Yên, a rural commune of Mỹ Hào
