= Pác Nặm district =

Coordinates: 22.5127°N 105.7182°E

Pác Nặm district Huyện Pác Nặm
- District
- Interactive map of Pác Nặm district
- Country: Vietnam
- Province: Bắc Kạn
- Capital: Bộc Bố

Area
  - Land: 183 sq mi (474 km^{2})

Population (2019 census)
  - Total: 33,439
  - Density: 183/sq mi (70.5/km^{2})
- Time zone: UTC+07:00 (Indochina Time)

Pác Nặm is a former rural district of Bắc Kạn province in the Northeast region of Vietnam. As of 2019 the district had a population of 33,439. The district covers an area of 474 km^{2}. The district capital lies at Bộc Bố.

== Administrative divisions ==
The district is subdivided to 10 rural communes:

1. Bằng Thành
2. Nhạn Môn
3. Công Bằng
4. Giáo Hiệu
5. Bộc Bố
6. Xuân La
7. Cổ Linh
8. An Thắng
9. Cao Tân
10. Nghiên Loan
