= Trung Hòa =

Trung Hòa may refer to several places in Vietnam, including:

- Trung Hòa, Cầu Giấy, a ward of Cầu Giấy District in Hanoi
- Trung Hòa, Chương Mỹ, a commune of Chương Mỹ District in Hanoi
- Trung Hòa, Bắc Kạn, a commune of Ngân Sơn District
- Trung Hòa, Đồng Nai, a commune of Trảng Bom District
- Trung Hòa, Hòa Bình, a commune of Tân Lạc District
- Trung Hòa, Hưng Yên, a commune of Yên Mỹ District
- Trung Hòa, Tiền Giang, a commune of Chợ Gạo District
- Trung Hòa, Tuyên Quang, a commune of Chiêm Hóa District

== See also ==
- Trung Hoà–Nhân Chính, a borough in southwestern Hanoi
- Trung Hóa, a commune of Minh Hóa District in Quảng Bình Province
