= Yên Thịnh (disambiguation) =

Yên Thịnh may refer to several places in Vietnam, including:

- Yên Thịnh, Thái Nguyên, a commune of Thái Nguyên province
- Yên Thịnh, Yên Bái, a former ward of Yên Bái
- Yên Thịnh, Ninh Bình, a former township and capital of Yên Mô District
- Yên Thịnh, Lạng Sơn, a former commune of Hữu Lũng District
- Yên Thịnh, Thanh Hoá, a former commune of Yên Định District
