= Phùng Chí Kiên =

Vietnamese revolutionary (1901–1941)

Personal details
- Born: Nguyễn Vĩ; 1901 Diễn Châu, Nghệ An, Annam (French protectorate)
- Died: 1941 (aged 39–40) Ngân Sơn, Bắc Kạn, Tonkin (French protectorate)
- Party: Communist Party of Vietnam
- Education: Whampoa Military Academy

Military service
- Allegiance: Democratic Republic of Vietnam (posthumously)
- Branch/service: People's Army of Vietnam (posthumously)

Phùng Chí Kiên (1901–1941) was a Vietnamese revolutionary. Kiên was born Nguyễn Vĩ in Diễn Châu, Nghệ An Province. In 1926, he went to Guangzhou to be trained by Ho Chi Minh. After that he matriculated at Whampoa Military Academy. In December 1927, he joined the Guangzhou Rebellion. In 1930, Kien joined the Communist Party of Vietnam and then become the first military leader of Communist Vietnam.

In 1931, Kiên was caught by Japanese force in Manchukuo on the way to Soviet Union to attend the Communist University of the Toilers of the East. From 1933 to 1934, he studied at Communist University of the Toilers of the East in Moscow. In 1934, Kiên went to Hong Kong where he became a member of the Central Committee of the Communist Party of Vietnam in 1935. In 1941, Kiên was caught and beheaded by French collaborators in Bắc Kạn Province.

Presently, some roads, streets, schools, and communes or wards in Vietnam are named after him.
