= Đồng Lạc =

Đồng Lạc may refer to several commune-level subdivisions in Vietnam, including:

- Đồng Lạc, Chí Linh, a ward of Chí Linh in Hải Dương Province
- Đồng Lạc, Hanoi, a commune of Chương Mỹ District
- Đồng Lạc, Bắc Kạn, a commune of Chợ Đồn District
- Đồng Lạc, Nam Sách, a commune of Nam Sách District in Hải Dương Province
- Đồng Lạc, Phú Thọ, a commune of Yên Lập District
- Đồng Lạc, Bắc Giang, a commune of Yên Thế District
