= Đồng Phúc (disambiguation) =

Đồng Phúc may refer to:

- Đồng Phúc, Thái Nguyên, a commune of Thái Nguyên province
- Đồng Phúc, Bắc Giang, a former commune of Yên Dũng district
