= Binh Trung =

Binh Trung may refer to several commune-level subdivisions in Vietnam, including:

== Bình Trung ==
- Bình Trung, Bắc Kạn: a former commune of Chợ Đồn district
- Bình Trung, Bà Rịa–Vũng Tàu: a former commune of Châu Đức district

== Bình Trưng ==
- Bình Trưng, Ho Chi Minh City: a ward in the former Thủ Đức city (previously District 2)
- Bình Trưng, Đồng Tháp: a commune in the former Châu Thành district, Tiền Giang province
