= Cường Lợi (disambiguation) =

Cường Lợi may refer to several places in Vietnam, including:

- Cường Lợi, Thái Nguyên, a rural commune of Thái Nguyên province
- Cường Lợi, Lạng Sơn, a former rural commune of Đình Lập District
