= Ba Bể National Park =

National park in Vietnam

Coordinates: 22°24′19″N 105°36′55″E

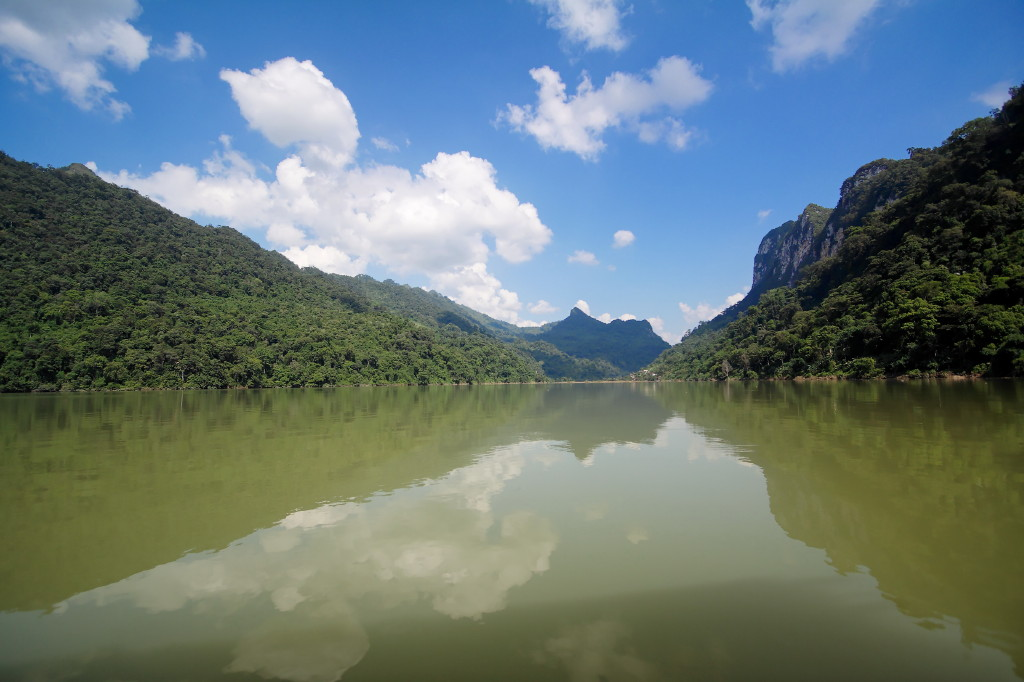
- Ba Bể Lake in the wet season

- Location within Vietnam
- Location: Thái Nguyên Province, Vietnam
- Area: 10,048 ha (38.80 sq mi)

Ramsar Wetland
- Official name: Ba Be National Park
- Designated: 2 February 2011
- Reference no.: 1938

Ba Bể National Park (Vietnamese: Vườn Quốc Gia Ba Bể) is a reserve in Thái Nguyên Province, Northeast region of Vietnam, set up to protect a very murky lake (Ba Bể Lake) along with surrounding limestone and highland evergreen forests. It is located about 240 kilometers northwest of the capital city Hanoi.

== Location ==
Ba Bể National Park is located in Thái Nguyên Province, about 240 kilometers north of Hanoi, about 70 km northwest of the ward of Bắc Kạn, and about 14 km west of the commune of Chợ Rã.

== Ba Bể Lake ==
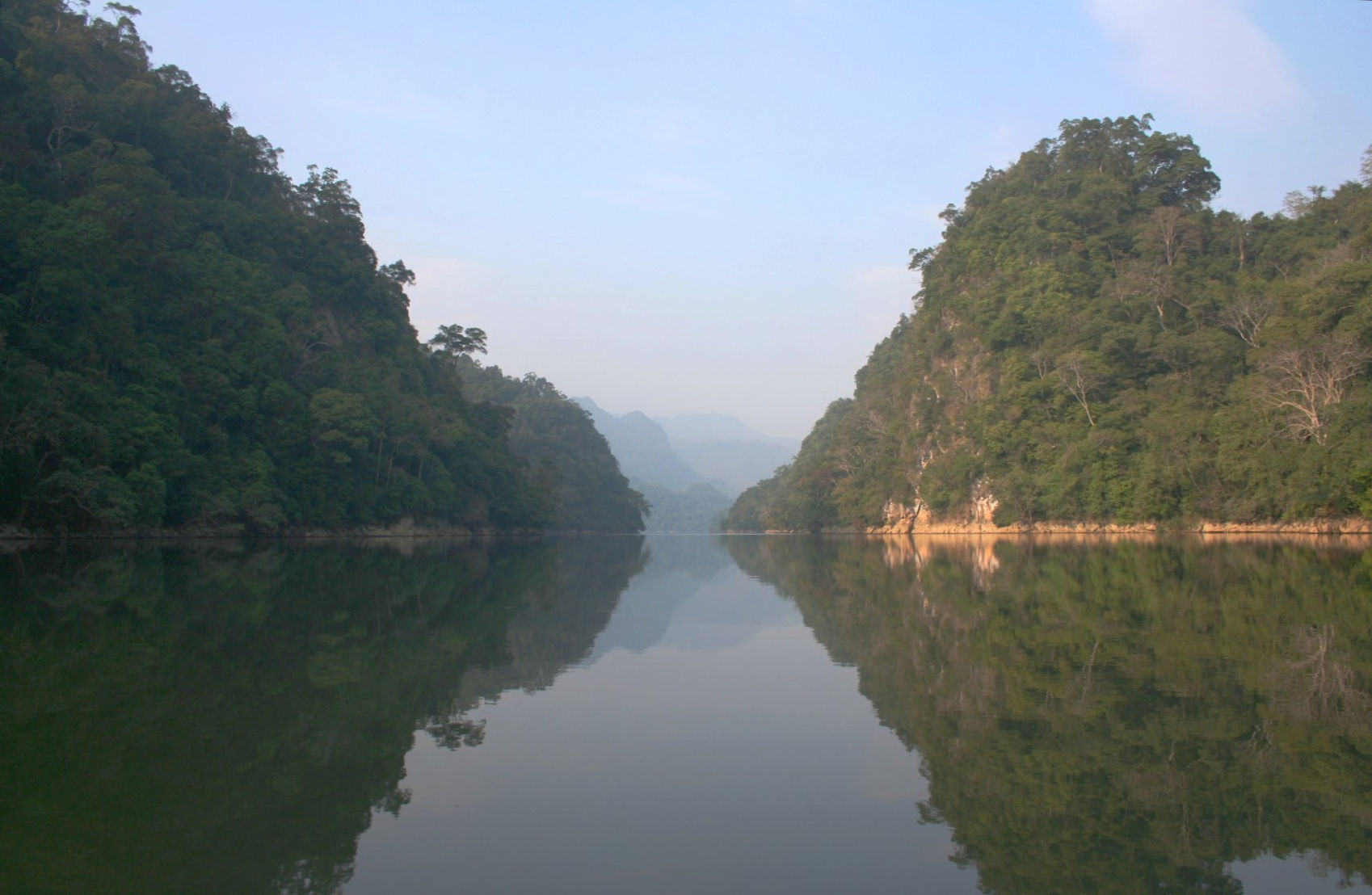
Ba Bể Lake in the dry season

Ba Bể Lake (Vietnamese: Hồ Ba Bể, Ba Bể meaning "Three Lakes" in the local Tay language) is the largest natural fresh water lake in Vietnam, stretching about 8 kilometers in the north-south direction. The surface area of the lake fluctuates between 3 and 5 km^{2} between dry and wet season. Unlike many lakes in Karst limestone areas, Ba Bể Lake never falls dry. Its average depth varies between 17 and 23 meters, the maximum depth is 35 meters. The lake lies about 150 meters above sea level, making it also Vietnam's highest lake. The name "Three Lakes" refers to the three parts of the lake named Pe Leng, Pe Lu, and Pe Lam. All these three parts are connected into a single continuous body of water, however.

The Ta Han, Bo Lu, and Leng Rivers feed into the lake from the south and the west. During the dry season, water is drained from the lake northwards into the Nang River. During high floods in the wet season, the latter flow is reversed however, and the lake takes up water from the Nang River thereby acting as a buffer regulating flooding.

== Flora and fauna ==
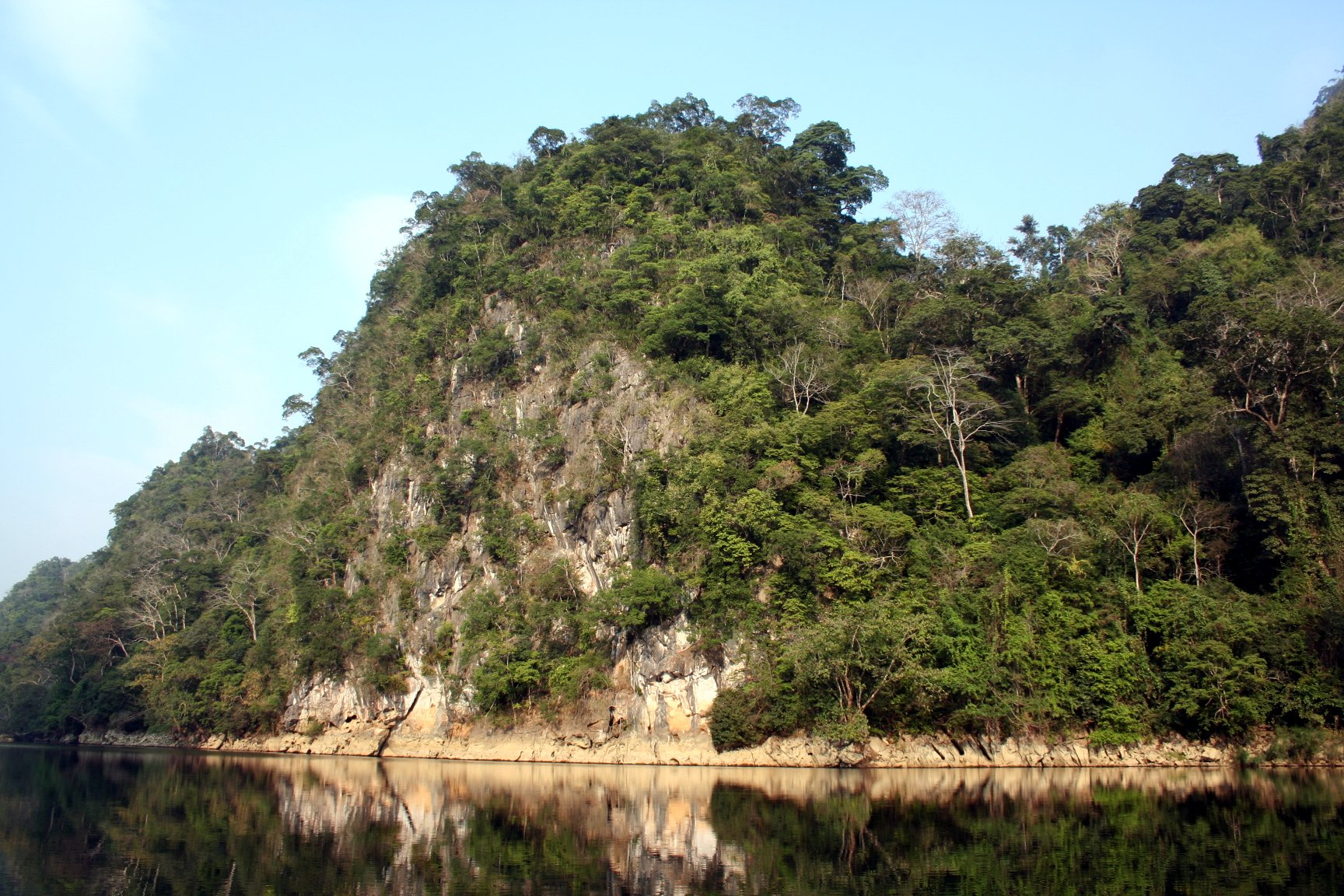
Limestone cliffs on Ba Bể Lake

The vegetation in Ba Bể National Park mainly consists of limestone and evergreen forest. The former covers steep mountain slopes on which the soil cover is thin. The latter depends on thicker soil cover and has a higher species diversity. The dominating tree species of the limestone forest are Burretiodendron hsienmu (Tiliaceae) and Streblus tonkinensis (Moraceae). Climbing bamboo (Ampelocalamus) is a regional endemic plant common on the hill slopes near the lake shore.

65 mammal species have been recorded in the park, among them: Chinese pangolin (Manis pentadactyla), slow loris (Nycticebus coucang), rhesus macaque, stump-tailed macaque, François' langur, Asian black bear, European otter, Owston's palm civet, Asian golden cat, mainland serow, red giant flying squirrel, particolored flying squirrel (Hylopetes alboniger), hairy-footed flying squirrel as well as 27 bat species.

Furthermore, 233 bird species, 43 reptile and amphibian species among them the king cobra and the Vietnamese salamander (Paramesotriton deloustali), have been recorded. In Ba Be lake, 106 fish species from 61 genera, 17 families, and 5 orders have been recorded. The park is also noteworthy for its diversity in butterflies for which 354 species have been recorded.

== Scenic landscape features ==
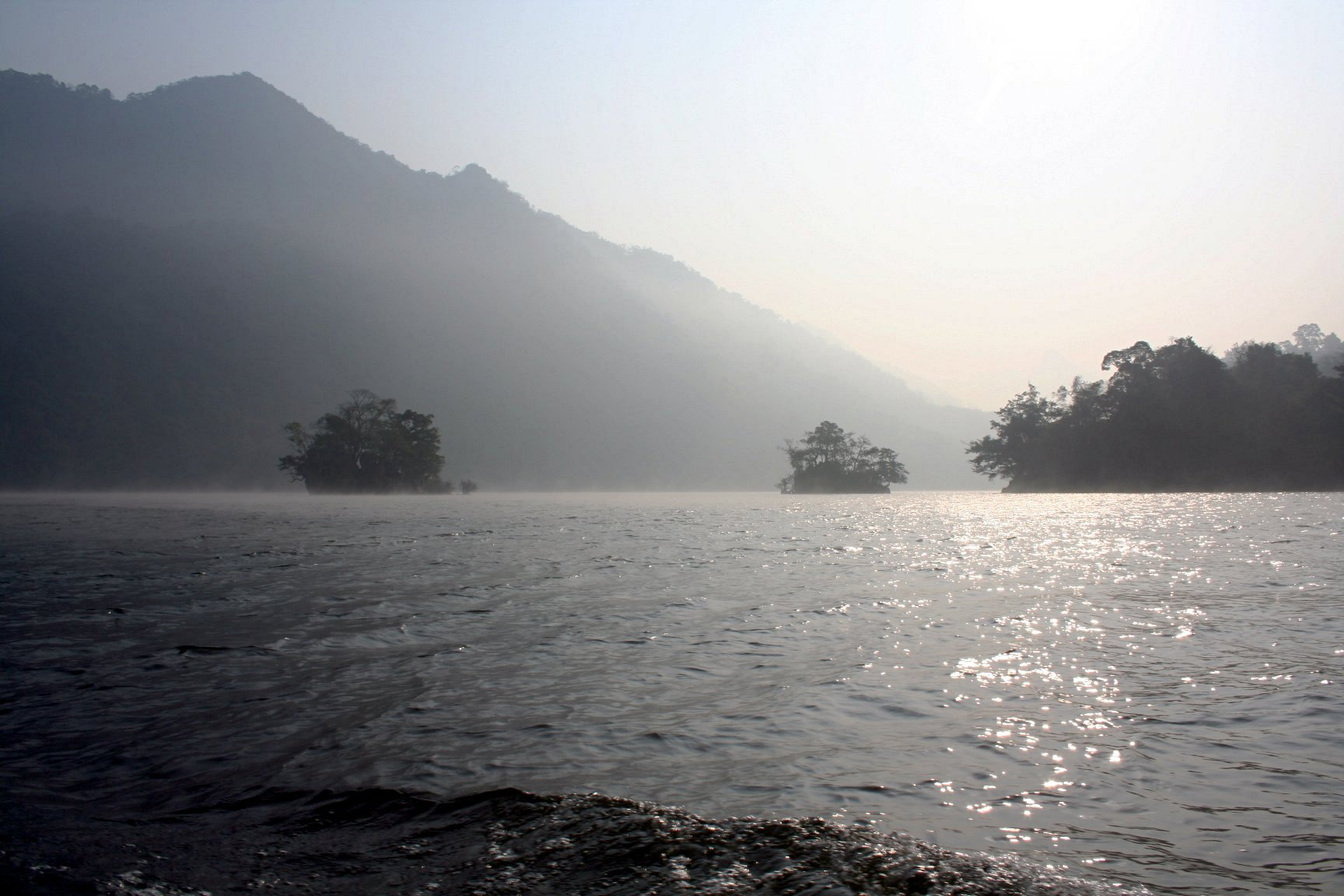
Morning mist over Ba Bê Lake

Puong Cave is a large cave in the north of the park through which the Nang River flows. The main cave is up to 50 meters high and about 300 meters long. It is inhabited by a population of 5 to 10 000 bats belonging to 18 species. The "Fairy Pond" is rock basin filled with clear water which seeps through the surrounding limestone rock. The Dau Dang Waterfall is formed by the Nang River. It consist of a sequence of rapids which stretch over a length of almost one kilometer. Widow Island is a small, cone-shaped islet near the center of the southern lake. According to the local legend, the islet was once the home of an old widow who was spared from a flood through divine intervention.

== National park and infrastructure ==
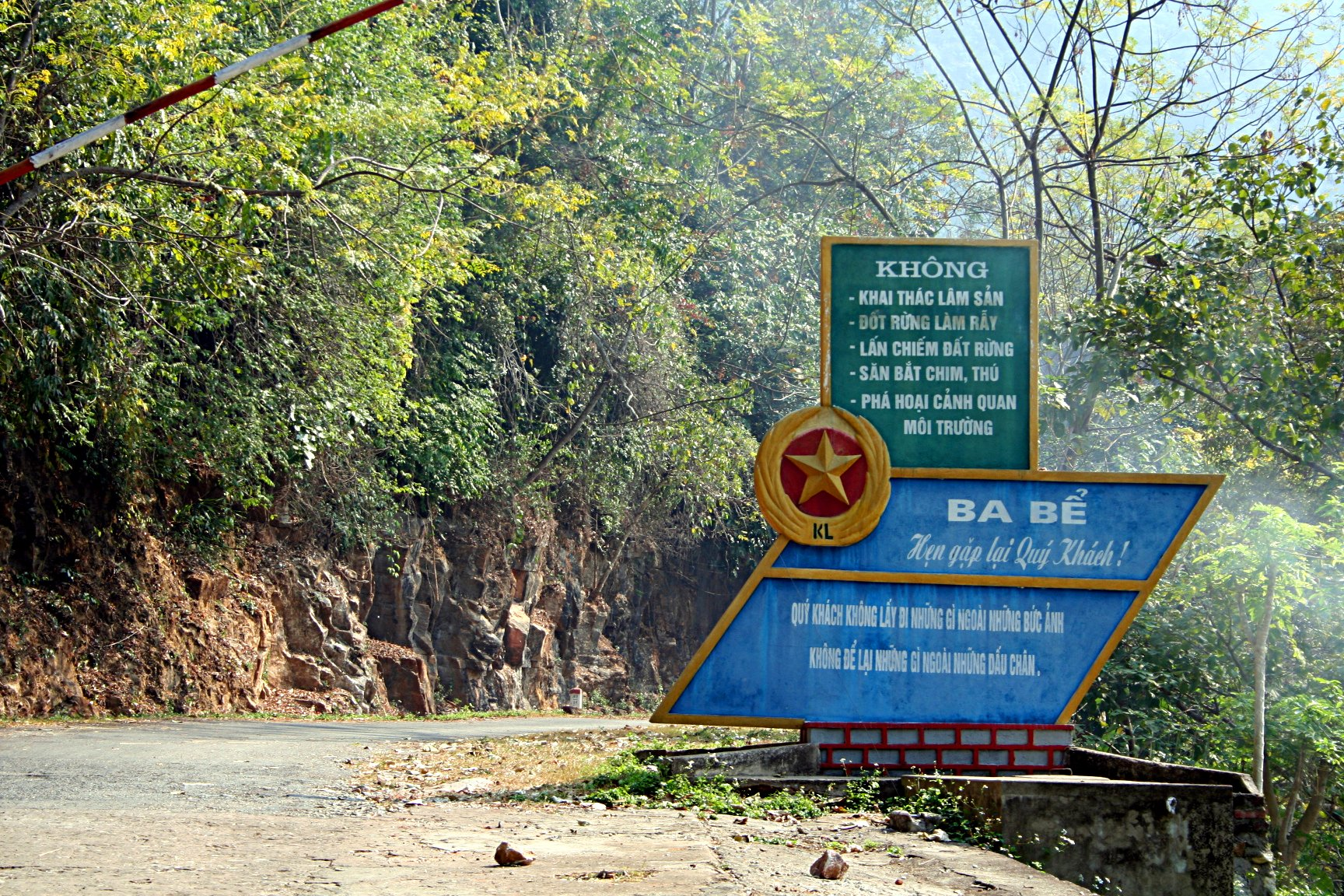
Park sign near the lake management station

Ba Bể National Park was established in 1992, it covers an area of 100.48 km^{2}. Facilities include an information center, guest houses, a lake management station, and an ecological research station opened in 2004.
