= Thượng Quan =

Coordinates: 18°46′N 105°19′E

- Commune and village
- Interactive map of Thượng Quan
- Country: Vietnam
- Province: Thái Nguyên Province
- Time zone: UTC+07:00

Thượng Quan is a commune (xã) and village in Thái Nguyên Province, in Vietnam.
