= Chợ Mới, Thái Nguyên =

Chợ Mới
- Commune
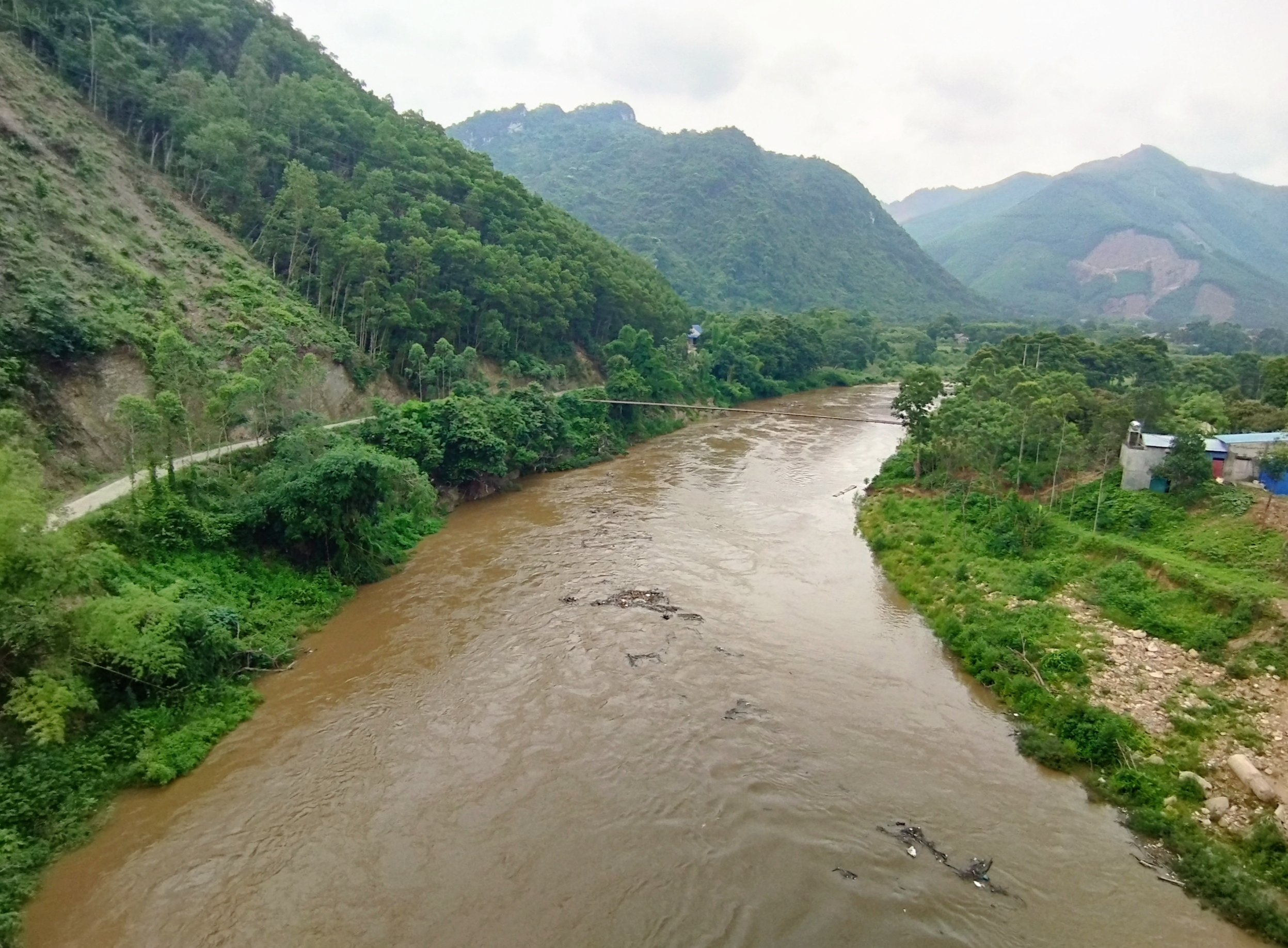
- Cau River in Cho Moi commune, Thai Nguyen province, Vietnam
- Interactive map of Chợ Mới
- Coordinates: 21°52′44″N 105°49′50″E
- Country: Vietnam
- Province: Thái Nguyên

Area
  - Total: 0.86 sq mi (2.24 km^{2})
- Time zone: UTC+07:00 (Indochina Time)

Chợ Mới is a commune (xã) of Thái Nguyên Province, in Vietnam.

In June 2025, Chợ Mới Commune was established through the merger of the entire natural area and population of Đồng Tâm Township (natural area: 22.82 km², population: 6,457), Quảng Chu Commune (natural area: 49.57 km², population: 4,589), and Như Cố Commune (natural area: 46.59 km², population: 3,173) of Chợ Mới District.
