= Yên Bình, Thái Nguyên =

Coordinates: 21.9367°N 105.9278°E

Yên Bình
- Commune and village
- Interactive map of Yên Bình
- Country: Vietnam
- Province: Thái Nguyên Province
- Time zone: UTC+07:00

Yên Bình is a commune (xã) and village in Thái Nguyên Province, in Vietnam.

In June 2025, Yên Bình Commune was established through the merger of the entire natural area and population of Yên Cư Commune (natural area: 47.20 km²; population: 3,286), Bình Văn Commune (natural area: 26.67 km²; population: 1,624), and Yên Hân Commune (natural area: 26.84 km²; population: 2,126) of Chợ Mới District.
