= Văn Lang, Thái Nguyên =

Coordinates: 22°16′N 106°05′E

Văn Lang
- Commune and village
- Interactive map of Văn Lang
- Country: Vietnam
- Province: Thái Nguyên Province
- Time zone: UTC+07:00

Văn Lang is a commune (xã) and village in Thái Nguyên Province, in Vietnam.

In June 2025, Văn Lang Commune was established through the merger of the entire natural area and population of Kim Hỷ Commune (natural area: 76.24 km²; population: 1,958), Lương Thượng Commune (natural area: 38.55 km²; population: 2,348), and Văn Lang Commune (natural area: 56.81 km²; population: 3,252) of Na Rì District.
