= Bằng Vân =

Coordinates: 22°29′56″N 106°04′23″E

- Commune and village
- Interactive map of Bằng Vân
- Country: Vietnam
- Province: Thái Nguyên Province
- Time zone: UTC+07:00

Bằng Vân is a commune (xã) and village in Thái Nguyên Province, in Vietnam.

In June 2025, Bằng Vân Commune was established through the merger of the entire natural area and population of Thượng Ân Commune (natural area: 66.78 km²; population: 2,168) and Bằng Vân Commune (natural area: 66.23 km²; population: 3,475) of Ngân Sơn District.
