= Nam Cường, Thái Nguyên =

Nam Cường
- Commune and village
- Location in Vietnam
- Coordinates: 22.3716°N 105.6066°E
- Country: Vietnam
- Province: Thái Nguyên Province
- Time zone: UTC+07:00

Nam Cường is a commune (xã) and village in Thái Nguyên Province, in Vietnam.

In June 2025, Nam Cường Commune was established through the merger of the entire natural area and population of Xuân Lạc Commune (natural area: 84.95 km²; population: 4,467), Nam Cường Commune (natural area: 32.25 km²; population: 3,766), and Đồng Lạc Commune (natural area: 32.45 km²; population: 2,560) of Chợ Đồn District.
