= Chợ Rã =

- Commune
- Location in Vietnam
- Coordinates: 22°27′N 105°42′E
- Country: Vietnam
- Province: Thái Nguyên Province

Area
  - Total: 1.60 sq mi (4.15 km^{2})

Population (2009)
  - Total: 3,672
  - Density: 2,290/sq mi (885/km^{2})
- Time zone: UTC+07:00

Chợ Rã is a commune (xã) of Thái Nguyên Province, in Vietnam.

In June 2025, Chợ Rã Commune was established through the merger of the entire natural area and population of Thượng Giáo Commune (natural area: 57.06 km²; population: 6,008), Chợ Rã Township (natural area: 4.58 km²; population: 4,705), and Địa Linh Commune (natural area: 31.17 km²; population: 3,794) of Ba Bể District.
