= Yên Phong, Thái Nguyên =

Coordinates: 22°03′N 105°37′E

Yên Phong
- Commune and village
- Interactive map of Yên Phong
- Country: Vietnam
- Province: Thái Nguyên Province
- Time zone: UTC+07:00

Yên Phong is a commune (xã) and village in Thái Nguyên Province, in Vietnam.

In June 2025, Yên Phong Commune was established through the merger of the entire natural area and population of Đại Sảo Commune (natural area: 32.58 km²; population: 2,253), Yên Mỹ Commune (natural area: 36.97 km²; population: 1,764), and Yên Phong Commune (natural area: 46.43 km²; population: 3,362) of Chợ Đồn District.
