= Hiệp Lực =

Coordinates: 21°05′N 106°09′E

- Commune and village
- Interactive map of Hiệp Lực
- Country: Vietnam
- Province: Thái Nguyên Province
- Time zone: UTC+07:00

Hiệp Lực is a commune (xã) and village in Thái Nguyên Province, in Vietnam.

In June 2025, Hiệp Lực Commune was established through the merger of the entire natural area and population of Thuần Mang Commune (natural area: 53.07 km²; population: 2,705) and Hiệp Lực Commune (natural area: 51.95 km²; population: 4,612) of Ngân Sơn District.
