= Nghiên Loan =

Coordinates: 22°31′10″N 105°42′59″E

- Rural commune
- Interactive map of Nghiên Loan
- Country: Vietnam
- Province: Bắc Kạn
- Time zone: UTC+07:00 (Indochina Time)

Nghiên Loan is a rural commune (xã) of Thái Nguyên Province, in Vietnam.

In June 2025, Nghiên Loan Commune was established through the merger of the entire natural area and population of Xuân La Commune (natural area: 39.70 km²; population: 3,267), An Thắng Commune (natural area: 33.20 km²; population: 1,510), and Nghiên Loan Commune (natural area: 57.43 km²; population: 6,263) of Pác Nặm District.
