= Thanh Mai =

- Commune and village
- Interactive map of Thanh Mai
- Country: Vietnam
- Province: Thái Nguyên Province
- Time zone: UTC+07:00

Thanh Mai is a commune (xã) and village in Thái Nguyên Province, in Vietnam.

In June 2025, Thanh Mai Commune was established through the merger of the entire natural area and population of Thanh Vận Commune (natural area: 29.79 km²; population: 2,475), Thanh Mai Commune (natural area: 40.32 km²; population: 3,006), and Mai Lạp Commune (natural area: 40.97 km²; population: 1,925) of Chợ Mới District.
