= Phúc Lộc, Thái Nguyên =

Phúc Lộc
- Commune and village
- Interactive map of Phúc Lộc
- Country: Vietnam
- Province: Thái Nguyên Province
- Time zone: UTC+07:00

Phúc Lộc is a commune (xã) in Thái Nguyên Province, in Vietnam.

In June 2025, Phúc Lộc Commune was established through the merger of the entire natural area and population of Bành Trạch Commune (natural area: 59.59 km²; population: 3,382), Phúc Lộc Commune (natural area: 63.22 km²; population: 3,812), and Hà Hiệu Commune (natural area: 40.25 km²; population: 3,160) of Ba Bể District.
