= Bằng Thành =

Coordinates: 22°41′00″N 105°42′43″E

- Rural commune
- Interactive map of Bằng Thành
- Country: Vietnam
- Province: Thái Nguyên
- Time zone: UTC+07:00 (Indochina Time)

Bằng Thành is a rural commune (xã) of Thái Nguyên Province, in Vietnam.

In June 2025, Bằng Thành Commune was established through the merger of the entire natural area and population of Bằng Thành Commune (natural area: 83.54 km²; population: 4,267), Bộc Bố Commune (natural area: 53.36 km²; population: 5,175), Nhạn Môn Commune (natural area: 43.67 km²; population: 2,381), and Giáo Hiệu Commune (natural area: 27.65 km²; population: 2,161) of Pác Nặm District.
