= Na Rì =

- Commune
- Location in Vietnam
- Coordinates: 22°12′44″N 105°36′39″E
- Country: Vietnam
- Province: Thái Nguyên Province
- Established: 8 April 1985

Area
  - Total: 1.9 sq mi (4.8 km^{2})

Population (2009)
  - Total: 3,400
  - Density: 1,830/sq mi (708/km^{2})
- Time zone: UTC+07:00

Na Rì is a commune (xã) of Thái Nguyên Province, in Vietnam.

In June 2025, Na Rì Commune was established through the merger of the entire natural area and population of Yến Lạc Township (natural area: 17.42 km^{2}; population: 5,162), Sơn Thành Commune (natural area: 40.21 km^{2}; population: 3,545), and Kim Lư Commune (natural area: 55.10 km^{2}; population: 2,787) of Na Rì District.
