= Thượng Minh =

Coordinates: 22°22′00″N 105°48′45″E

- Commune and village
- Interactive map of Thượng Minh
- Country: Vietnam
- Province: Thái Nguyên Province
- Time zone: UTC+07:00

Thượng Minh is a commune (xã) and village in Thái Nguyên Province, in Vietnam.

In June 2025, Thượng Minh Commune was established through the merger of the entire natural area and population of Yến Dương Commune (natural area: 39.80 km²; population: 2,892), Chu Hương Commune (natural area: 34.85 km²; population: 3,753), and Mỹ Phương Commune (natural area: 57.00 km²; population: 4,385) of Ba Bể District.
