= Quảng Bạch =

Coordinates: 22.2581°N 105.5836°E

- Commune and village
- Interactive map of Quảng Bạch
- Country: Vietnam
- Province: Thái Nguyên Province
- Time zone: UTC+07:00

Quảng Bạch is a commune (xã) and village in Thái Nguyên Province, in Vietnam.

In June 2025, Quảng Bạch Commune was established through the merger of the entire natural area and population of Quảng Bạch Commune (natural area: 43.21 km²; population: 2,078) and Tân Lập Commune (natural area: 32.01 km²; population: 1,737) of Chợ Đồn District.
