= Chợ Đồn =

Chợ Đồn Xã Chợ Đồn
- Commune
- Location in Vietnam
- Coordinates: 22°40′N 106°21′E
- Country: Vietnam
- Province: Thái Nguyên
- Established: 8 April 1985

Area
  - Total: 10.53 sq mi (27.28 km^{2})

Population (13 Sep. 2012)
  - Total: 6,523
  - Density: 600/sq mi (230/km^{2})
- Time zone: UTC+07:00
- Climate: Cwa

Chợ Đồn is a commune (xã) of Thái Nguyên Province, in Vietnam.

In June 2025, Chợ Đồn Commune was established through the merger of the entire natural area and population of Ngọc Phái Commune (natural area: 40.45 km²; population: 2,622), Phương Viên Commune (natural area: 37.58 km²; population: 3,839), Bằng Lũng Township (natural area: 24.90 km²; population: 7,694), and Bằng Lãng Commune (natural area: 39.17 km²; population: 2,097) of Chợ Đồn District.
