= Tân Kỳ, Thái Nguyên =

Coordinates: 21°59′N 105°51′E

Tân Kỳ
- Commune and village
- Interactive map of Tân Kỳ
- Country: Vietnam
- Province: Thái Nguyên Province
- Time zone: UTC+07:00

Tân Kỳ is a commune (xã) and village in Thái Nguyên Province, in Vietnam.

In June 2025, Tân Kỳ Commune was established through the merger of the entire natural area and population of Tân Sơn Commune (natural area: 66.81 km²; population: 1,782), Cao Kỳ Commune (natural area: 59.27 km²; population: 3,369), and Hòa Mục Commune (natural area: 41.74 km²; population: 2,567) of Chợ Mới District.
