= Bạch Thông =

- Commune and village
- Country: Vietnam
- Province: Thái Nguyên Province
- Time zone: UTC+07:00

Bạch Thông is a commune (xã) and village in Thái Nguyên Province, in Vietnam.

In June 2025, Bạch Thông Commune was established through the merger of the entire natural area and population of Đồng Thắng Commune of Chợ Đồn District (natural area: 46.42 km^{2}; population: 4,055) and two communes of Bạch Thông District: Dương Phong Commune (natural area: 48.92 km^{2}; population: 2,050) and Quang Thuận Commune (natural area: 32.50 km^{2}; population: 2,146).
