= Thanh Thịnh =

- Commune and village
- Interactive map of Thanh Thịnh
- Country: Vietnam
- Province: Thái Nguyên Province
- Time zone: UTC+07:00

Thanh Thịnh is a commune (xã) and village in Thái Nguyên Province, in Vietnam.

In June 2025, the current Thanh Thịnh Commune was established through the merger of the entire natural area and population of Nông Hạ Commune (natural area: 60.91 km²; population: 4,234) and Thanh Thịnh Commune (natural area: 51.40 km²; population: 4,568) of Chợ Mới District.
