= Phong Quang =

Coordinates: 22°10′08″N 105°48′23″E

- Commune and village
- Interactive map of Phong Quang
- Country: Vietnam
- Province: Thái Nguyên Province

Area
  - Total: 59.25 sq mi (153.46 km^{2})

Population (2025)
  - Total: 6,144
  - Density: 40/sq mi (15/km^{2})
- Time zone: UTC+7 (UTC+7)

Phong Quang is a commune (xã) and village in Thái Nguyên Province, in Vietnam.

In June 2025, Phong Quang Commune was established through the merger of the entire natural area and population of Dương Quang Commune of Bắc Kạn City (natural area: 25.64 km²; population: 3,401) and Đôn Phong Commune of Bạch Thông District (natural area: 127.82 km²; population: 2,743).
