= Ngân Sơn =

Coordinates: 22°26′N 106°00′E

- Commune and village
- Interactive map of Ngân Sơn
- Country: Vietnam
- Province: Thái Nguyên Province
- Time zone: UTC+07:00

Ngân Sơn is a commune (xã) and village in Thái Nguyên Province, in Vietnam.

In June 2025, Ngân Sơn Commune was established through the merger of the entire natural area and population of Cốc Đán Commune (natural area: 65.91 km²; population: 2,849), Đức Vân Commune (natural area: 28.64 km²; population: 1,641), and Vân Tùng Township (natural area: 51.01 km²; population: 3,770) of Ngân Sơn District.
