= Trần Phú, Thái Nguyên =

Village in Na Rì District, Vietnam

Coordinates: 22°05′55″N 106°05′17″E

Trần Phú
- Commune and village
- Interactive map of Trần Phú
- Country: Vietnam
- Province: Thái Nguyên Province
- Time zone: UTC+07:00

Trần Phú is a commune (xã) and village in Thái Nguyên Province, in Vietnam.

In June 2025, Trần Phú Commune was established through the merger of the entire natural area and population of Văn Minh Commune (natural area: 38.17 km²; population: 1,329), Cư Lễ Commune (natural area: 60.13 km²; population: 2,454), and Trần Phú Commune (natural area: 46.99 km²; population: 3,266) of Na Rì District.
