= Nà Phặc =

- Commune
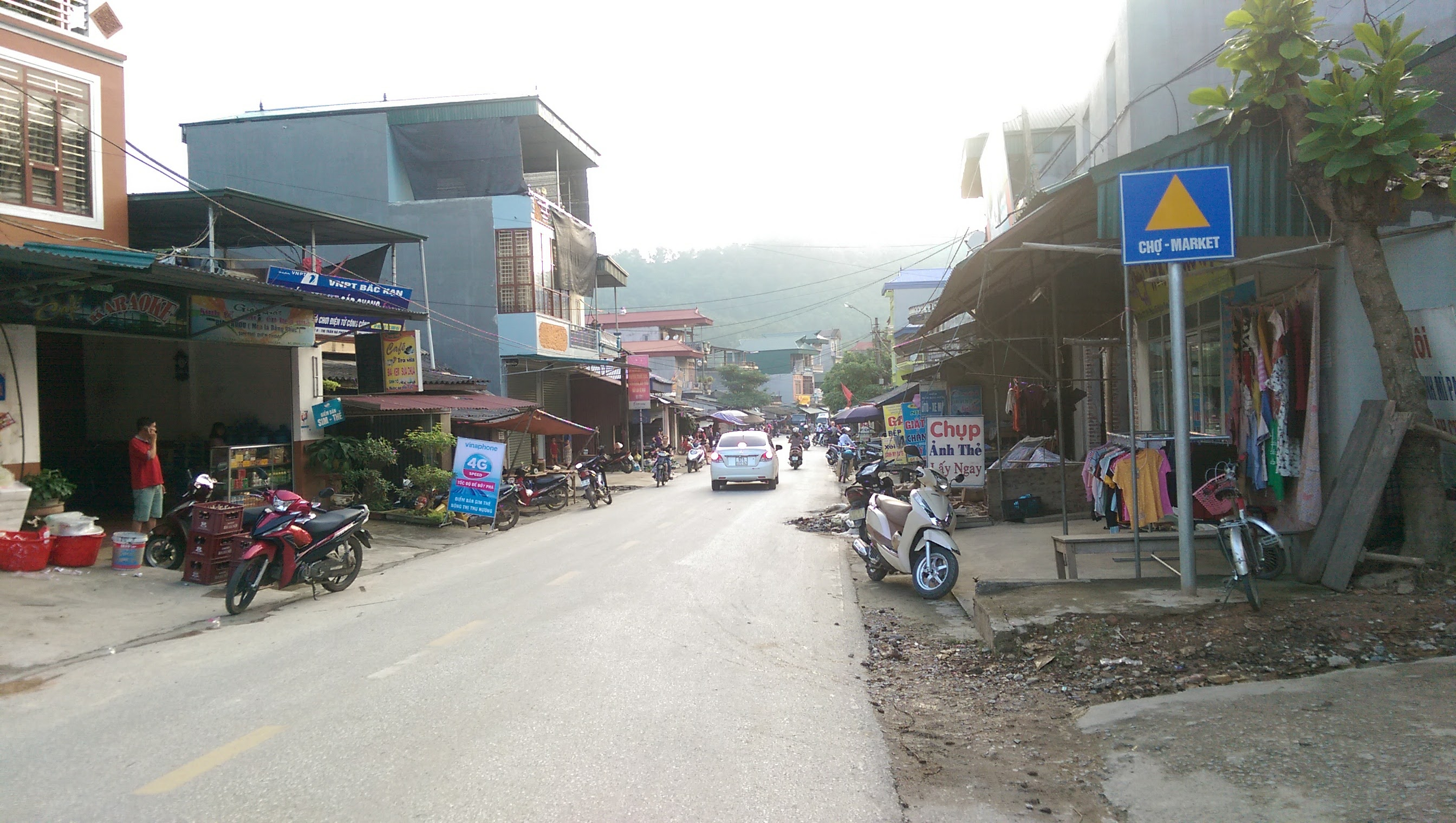

- Location in Vietnam
- Coordinates: 22°26′N 105°59′E
- Country: Vietnam
- Province: Thái Nguyên Province
- Established: 8 October 1980

Area
  - Total: 24.11 sq mi (62.45 km^{2})

Population (2009)
  - Total: 5,702
  - Density: 236/sq mi (91.3/km^{2})
- Time zone: UTC+07:00

Nà Phặc is a commune (xã) of Thái Nguyên Province, in Vietnam.

In June 2025, Nà Phặc Commune was established through the merger of the entire natural area and population of Trung Hòa Commune (natural area: 38.41 km²; population: 1,563) and Nà Phặc Township (natural area: 62.77 km²; population: 7,668) of Ngân Sơn District.
