= Yên Thịnh =

- Commune and village
- Interactive map of Yên Thịnh
- Coordinates: 22°13′12″N 105°29′50″E
- Country: Vietnam
- Province: Thái Nguyên Province
- Time zone: UTC+07:00

Yên Thịnh is a commune (xã) and village in Thái Nguyên Province, in Vietnam.

In June 2025, Yên Thịnh Commune was established through the merger of the entire natural area and population of Bản Thi Commune (natural area: 64.92 km²; population: 1,970), Yên Thịnh Commune (natural area: 51.12 km²; population: 1,957), and Yên Thượng Commune (natural area: 49.77 km²; population: 1,549) of Chợ Đồn District.
