= Cường Lợi =

Coordinates: 22.2744°N 106.2109°E

- Commune and village
- Interactive map of Cường Lợi
- Country: Vietnam
- Province: Thái Nguyên Province

Area
  - Total: 45.50 sq mi (117.85 km^{2})

Population (2025)
  - Total: 5,731
  - Density: 126.0/sq mi (48.63/km^{2})
- Time zone: UTC+07:00

Cường Lợi is a commune (xã) and village in Thái Nguyên Province, in Vietnam. The commune borders the provinces of Lạng Sơn and Cao Bằng.

In June 2025, the current Cường Lợi Commune was established through the merger of the entire natural area and population of Văn Vũ Commune (natural area: 89.48 km²; population: 3,059) and Cường Lợi Commune (natural area: 28.37 km²; population: 2,672) of Na Rì District.
