= Bắc Kạn =

- Urban ward
- Country: Vietnam
- Province: Thái Nguyên

Area
  - Total: 1.67 sq mi (4.32 km^{2})

Population
  - Total: 6,342
  - Density: 3,800/sq mi (1,468/km^{2})
- Time zone: UTC+07:00 (Indochina Time)

Bắc Kạn is an urban ward (phường) of Thái Nguyên Province, in Vietnam.

In June 2025, Bắc Kạn Ward was established through the merger of the entire natural area and population of Sông Cầu Ward (natural area: 3.96 km²; population: 10,192), Phùng Chí Kiên Ward (natural area: 3.34 km²; population: 8,016), Nông Thượng Commune (natural area: 22.08 km²; population: 3,811), and Xuất Hóa Ward (natural area: 42.63 km²; population: 3,368) of Bắc Kạn City.
