= Côn Minh =

- Commune and village
- Interactive map of Côn Minh
- Country: Vietnam
- Province: Thái Nguyên Province
- Time zone: UTC+07:00

Côn Minh is a commune (xã) and village in Thái Nguyên Province, in Vietnam.

In June 2025, Côn Minh Commune was established through the merger of the entire natural area and population of Côn Minh Commune (natural area: 63.72 km²; population: 2,890), Quang Phong Commune (natural area: 45.04 km²; population: 1,825), and Dương Sơn Commune (natural area: 37.50 km²; population: 1,920) of Na Rì District.
