= Xuân Dương, Thái Nguyên =

Xuân Dương
- Commune and village
- Location in Vietnam
- Coordinates: 22.0194°N 106.0792°E
- Country: Vietnam
- Province: Thái Nguyên Province
- Time zone: UTC+07:00

Xuân Dương is a commune (xã) and village in Thái Nguyên Province, in Vietnam.

In June 2025, Xuân Dương Commune was established through the merger of the entire natural area and population of Xuân Dương Commune (natural area: 35.69 km²; population: 2,508), Đổng Xá Commune (natural area: 78.79 km²; population: 3,029), and Liêm Thủy Commune (natural area: 45.67 km²; population: 1,475) of Na Rì District.
