= Nghĩa Tá =

Coordinates: 22°03′N 105°30′E

- Commune and village
- Interactive map of Nghĩa Tá
- Country: Vietnam
- Province: Thái Nguyên Province
- Time zone: UTC+07:00

Nghĩa Tá is a commune (xã) and village in Thái Nguyên Province, in Vietnam.

In June 2025, Nghĩa Tá Commune was established through the merger of the entire natural area and population of Lương Bằng Commune (natural area: 61.09 km²; population: 2,275), Nghĩa Tá Commune (natural area: 40.61 km²; population: 1,745), and Bình Trung Commune (natural area: 65.18 km²; population: 3,767) of Chợ Đồn District.
