= Đồng Phúc =

- Commune and village
- Interactive map of Đồng Phúc
- Coordinates: 22°19′00″N 105°41′55″E
- Country: Vietnam
- Province: Thái Nguyên Province
- Time zone: UTC+07:00

Đồng Phúc is a commune (xã) and village in Thái Nguyên Province, in Vietnam.

In June 2025, Đồng Phúc Commune was established through the merger of the entire natural area and population of three communes of Ba Bể District: Quảng Khê Commune (natural area: 55.16 km²; population: 4,001), Hoàng Trĩ Commune (natural area: 35.30 km²; population: 1,456), Đồng Phúc Commune (natural area: 58.61 km²; population: 3,188), and Bằng Phúc Commune of Chợ Đồn District (natural area: 50.03 km²; population: 3,077).
