= Pù Luông Nature Reserve =

Nature reserve in northern Vietnam

Pù Luông Nature Reserve is a nature reserve in northern Vietnam. This nature reserve is situated in Quan Hóa and Bá Thước districts of Thanh Hóa Province, North Central Coast region of Vietnam. Pu Luong Nature Reserve is bordered by Mai Châu, Tân Lạc and Lạc Sơn districts of Hòa Bình Province. The reserve is located along two parallel mountain ridges, that run from north-west to south-east, and are divided by a central valley, which contains several human settlements and a large agricultural land area, therefore, is not included within the nature reserve.

Pù Luông is endowed with great biodiversity in its flora and fauna.
