= Xuất Hóa =

Xuất Hóa may refer to several places in Vietnam, including:

- Xuất Hóa, Bắc Kạn, a ward of Bắc Kạn city
- Xuất Hóa, Hòa Bình, a rural commune of Lạc Sơn District
