= Lạc Sơn district =

Lạc Sơn (Mươ̒ng: Hwiḙ̂n La̭c Xơn, Kinh: Huyện Lạc Sơn) is a former rural district of Hòa Bình province in the Northwest region of Vietnam.

== History ==
Its name Lạc-sơn in Kinh language is originated from the old name rú-Ra̭c (núi-Nước) in Muong language, which means "the mountain of the stream". The reason for that name is because this area has the highest terrain in Hòa Bình province and is the origin of many rivers and streams with large water reserves.

The Mường language in Lạc Sơn is one of the three most important branches of the Muong language system. However, due to the geographical difference and some living habits, the current Mường language from Lạc Sơn was unable to connect with Mường in Mai Châu. The sound of Lạc Sơn's Mường can only hear and understand a little in the Mường community in the Western highland of Thanh Hóa province.

Also because of the uneven geographical characteristics and almost divided between villages, Lạc Sơn's economy has the lowest value in Hòa Bình province. It is mainly based on growing corn, raising black pigs and goats. From past to present, Lạc Sơn people have to import the water rice from outside but cannot grow them themselves.

Xóm Khú ("Crocodile hamlet") and xóm Rục ("Deer hamlet") is often known as the oldest places in Hòa Bình province. Some traces of middle-ages residential areas can be found in these places. Those who make that cultural site were thought to have been settled by the researchers before the Xá refugees from Mai Châu moved to Ngọc Lâu [commune]. In addition, hang Xóm Trại ("the cave of the Farm hamlet") was soon recognized as a special archaeological monument from 2011 for finding a number of prehistoric stone tools. However, this cave only serves research purposes so civilians and tourists are not allowed to access.

== Culture ==
Lạc Sơn district's culture and customs are preserved. The Muong girls in this area have passed down many tunes and dances for use around the fire for generations. The fire is very respected.

During the Green-Summer Volunteer campaign organized by the University of Social Sciences and Humanities of Hanoi in 2008, the two communes Ngọc Sơn and Ngọc Lâu became a focus to connect students with the ethnic minority community. Many students have recorded some folk tunes and even local language to serve the scientific research through this activity.

Under the special sponsorship of the Government of Vietnam, Lạc Sơn has been covered with mobile phones and internet with broadband since 2008. According to a statistic in 2023, this district has the fastest phone and internet speeds within Vietnam, and it is a successful place for the cause of industrialisation and modernisation of the country.

== Geography ==
The terrain of Lạc Sơn district is like an equilateral triangle that has two angles adjacent to Thanh Hóa province.

Despite being the main area of limestone mountains, this district is recognized as an advantage in water reserves. Which in it, Bưởi River (sông Bưởi, "linga stream") and Mu Falls (thác Mu, "yoni stream") are famous landscapes in Lạc Sơn district.

=== Administration ===
Lạc Sơn is divided into 24 commune-level sub-divisions, including the township of Vụ Bản and 23 rural communes : Ân Nghĩa, Bình Hẻm, Chí Đạo, Định Cư, Hương Nhượng, Miền Đồi, Mỹ Thành, Ngọc Lâu, Ngọc Sơn, Nhân Nghĩa, Quý Hòa, Quyết Thắng, Tân Lập, Tân Mỹ, Thượng Cốc, Tự Do, Tuân Đạo, Văn Nghĩa, Văn Sơn, Vũ Bình, Xuất Hóa, Yên Nghiệp, Yên Phú.

Lạc Sơn is the most crowded Muong demographic district in the Tonkin Gulf. As of 2019, the district had a population of 136,652. The district covers an area of 580 km^{2}, where is equivalent to Singapore Island and a bit larger than Rügen. The district capital lies at Vụ Bản.

The number of Kinh people in this district is very small and only focused on stable in Vụ Bản township. In addition, there is no third nation in the district.

=== Climate ===
Climate data for Lạc Sơn
Month	Jan	Feb	Mar	Apr	May	Jun	Jul	Aug	Sep	Oct	Nov	Dec	Year
Record high °C (°F)	33.8 (92.8)	37.5 (99.5)	39.4 (102.9)	42.0 (107.6)	43.4 (110.1)	40.6 (105.1)	41.0 (105.8)	39.8 (103.6)	37.5 (99.5)	37.8 (100.0)	36.6 (97.9)	34.3 (93.7)	43.4 (110.1)
Mean daily maximum °C (°F)	20.6 (69.1)	21.6 (70.9)	24.4 (75.9)	29.0 (84.2)	32.8 (91.0)	33.7 (92.7)	33.7 (92.7)	32.7 (90.9)	31.3 (88.3)	29.0 (84.2)	26.0 (78.8)	22.7 (72.9)	28.1 (82.6)
Daily mean °C (°F)	16.5 (61.7)	17.9 (64.2)	20.5 (68.9)	24.4 (75.9)	27.3 (81.1)	28.4 (83.1)	28.4 (83.1)	27.8 (82.0)	26.5 (79.7)	24.1 (75.4)	20.8 (69.4)	17.6 (63.7)	23.3 (73.9)
Mean daily minimum °C (°F)	13.8 (56.8)	15.4 (59.7)	18.1 (64.6)	21.4 (70.5)	23.7 (74.7)	25.1 (77.2)	25.2 (77.4)	24.8 (76.6)	23.6 (74.5)	21.0 (69.8)	17.5 (63.5)	14.2 (57.6)	20.4 (68.7)
Record low °C (°F)	0.7 (33.3)	3.5 (38.3)	5.9 (42.6)	11.6 (52.9)	15.8 (60.4)	18.1 (64.6)	19.3 (66.7)	21.6 (70.9)	16.3 (61.3)	10.4 (50.7)	4.1 (39.4)	0.1 (32.2)	0.1 (32.2)
Average rainfall mm (inches)	33.3 (1.31)	25.5 (1.00)	46.5 (1.83)	94.3 (3.71)	244.9 (9.64)	260.6 (10.26)	310.7 (12.23)	347.6 (13.69)	317.4 (12.50)	194.7 (7.67)	76.9 (3.03)	25.5 (1.00)	1,977.9 (77.87)
Average rainy days	10.5	12.0	14.7	14.5	16.7	16.8	18.1	18.5	15.2	11.5	7.8	6.7	162.9
Average relative humidity (%)	84.9	86.1	86.4	85.3	82.9	83.9	84.8	87.4	87.4	86.0	84.7	83.8	85.3
Mean monthly sunshine hours	64.2	58.8	54.8	95.4	154.4	152.1	150.7	147.4	139.9	130.5	110.2	85.9	1,336.8
Source: Vietnam Institute for Building Science and Technology

== See also ==
- Lạc Thủy district
- Mai Châu district
- Tân Lạc district
- Yên Thủy district
