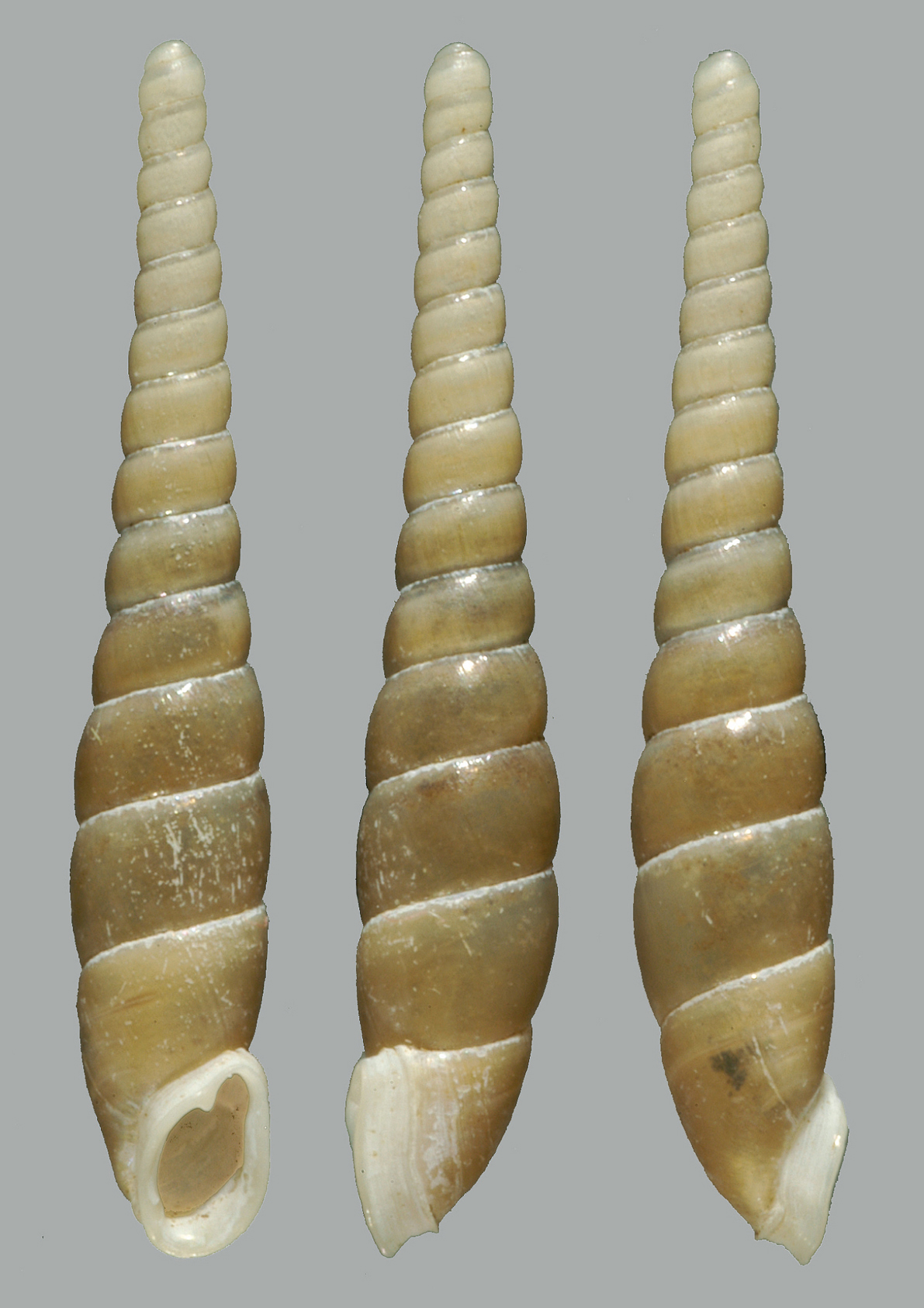
- Three views of the shell of the holotype of Leptacme cuongi

Scientific classification
- Kingdom: Animalia
- Phylum: Mollusca
- Class: Gastropoda
- (unranked): clade Heterobranchia clade Euthyneura clade Panpulmonata clade Eupulmonata clade Stylommatophora informal group Sigmurethra
- Superfamily: Clausilioidea
- Family: Clausiliidae
- Genus: Leptacme
- Species: L. cuongi

Binomial name
- Leptacme cuongi Maassen & Gittenberger, 2007

= Leptacme cuongi =

Species of gastropod

Leptacme cuongi is a species of air-breathing land snail, a terrestrial gastropod mollusc in the family Clausiliidae, the door snails.

This species is known to occur in a limestone area in Thanh Hóa Province, Vietnam. The shell is high-spired and slender with numerous whorls, and is usually a little over 10 mm in length. When the species was described in 2007, as well as a detailed shell description, full accounts of the reproductive system and the radula of this species were also given.

The specific name cuongi is in honor of the biologist Duong Ngoc Cuong, who works at the Institute of Ecology and Biological Resources in Hanoi, Vietnam, and who is a friend of the first author.

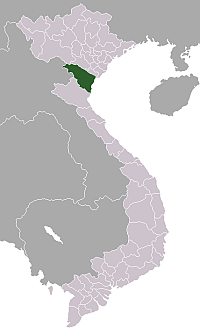
Thanh Hóa Province, Vietnam, where Leptacme cuongi occurs

== Distribution ==
This species occurs in:

- Vietnam

The type locality is Pu Luong Nature Reserve, a limestone hill near the native village Am, 20°27.39'N 105°13.65'E, in Thanh Hóa Province, Vietnam.

== Description ==
The shell is dextral, not decollate, light corneous, fragile, glossy and rather translucent. It is very slender, with a nearly cylindrical, narrow, upper third and a spindle-shaped lower part. The shell has 12-15 moderately convex whorls separated by an indented, relatively deep suture. Protoconch is glossy, teleoconch whorls are with obtuse growth-lines, which are more rib-like on the more narrowly sculptured, cervical part of the last whorl. Peristome is double; inner lip recognizable as a narrow ridge, contacting the body whorl and closing the umbilicus (visible in not fully grown specimens); outer lip very strongly thickened, with some prominent growth-ridges, tube-like protruding. Neck is with a more or less clearly developed basal crest. Aperture is obliquely pear-shaped to narrowed elliptical, with a sinulus bordered by the lamella parietalis and a knob on the peristome, whitish inside. Peristome is continuous, white, broadly reflexed. In frontal view, the prominent lamella parietalis (= superior), and the more inconspicuous lamella columellaris (= inferior) and plica principalis are seen, whereas the frontal end of the lamella subcolumellaris is usually discernible as a blunt denticle. The lamella parietalis is connected with the spiralis, which reaches as far as the lamella subcolumellaris inside, i.e. hardly further than the columellaris; there is no lamella inserta. Ventro-laterally, next to the plica principalis, there are four short, nearly parallel plicae palatales. Clausilial blade is rather broad, curvature of its outer border dictated by the position of the short palatal plicae.

The width of the shell is 2.0–2.6 mm, 2.2 mm on average. The height of the shell is 10.4 mm (12 whorls)–14.0 mm (15 whorls), 11.9 mm on average.

The conchologically most similar species, Leptacme eregia Szekeres, 1969, can be distinguished from Leptacme cuongi by its much larger shell (17.8 mm instead of 11.9 mm), its more rounded neck, i.e. without a basal crest, the lamella inferior which is situated more deeply inside, and the plica principalis, which ends less deep.

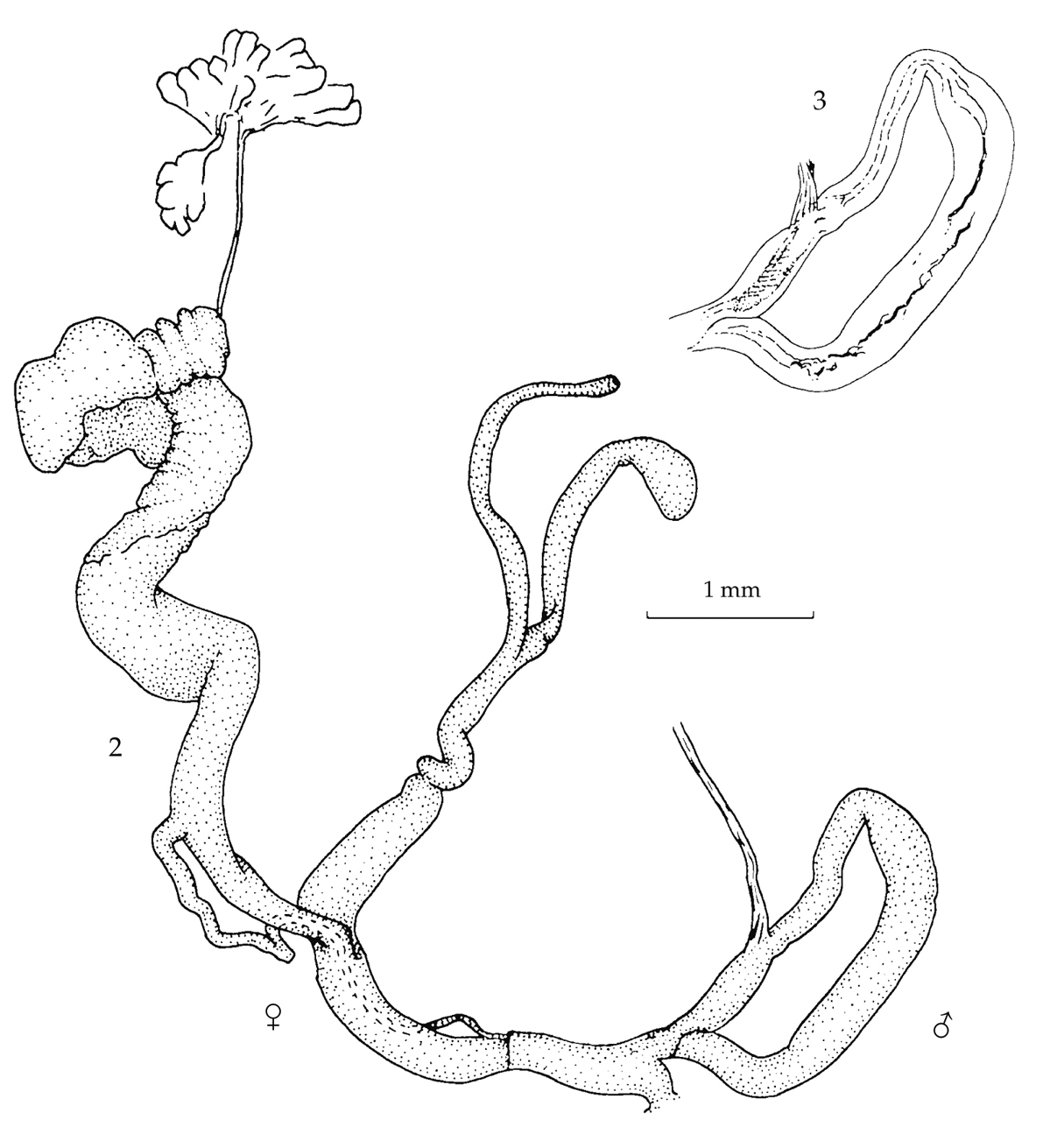
Drawing of the reproductive system of Leptacme cuongi with detail of the penial lumen after a transparent specimen (upper right).

Reproductive system: Vagina is more than twice the length of the oviduct. Oviduct about half as long as the proximal part of the pedunculus, which is longer than the distal part. Basally the pedunculus is much broader than the adjoining oviduct. The bursa of the bursa copulatrix is separate from the spermoviduct; it reaches hardly further than the diverticulum. Male part of the genitalia with a single retractor muscle, without flagellum or caecum. Penis is tripartite as far as can be judged on the basis of the transparent genital slides, forming a loop with a sharp curvature about halfway. Proximal half formed by (1) a short segment with a relatively simple luminal surface, followed by (2) a clearly broader and about three times longer part with some longitudinal ridges with zigzag borders. Distal half, with the insertion of the retractor muscle slightly distal from halfway, about as broad or little broader than the narrow part of the proximal half; penial segment (3) with a relatively simple luminal surface; epiphallus (4) with a vague pattern of small pustulae, most clearly seen at its distal end. Vas deferens, a short part of the penis and nearly as much as the proximal half of the vagina united by a common sheath.

The large main cusp of the central tooth of radula is accompanied by prominent ectocones. The 7-8 adjoining lateral teeth in half a row have equally small ectocones. All these teeth have prominent basal plates with interrow support ridges. In the first marginal tooth, the main cusp is less symmetrical and the basal plate is less prominently developed. The following c.10 marginal teeth are increasingly more asymmetrical initially, with an endocone on the main cusp and ectones with two or three cusps in the teeth closer to the margin, which are irregularly comb-like when the main cusp with the endocone becomes relatively smaller.

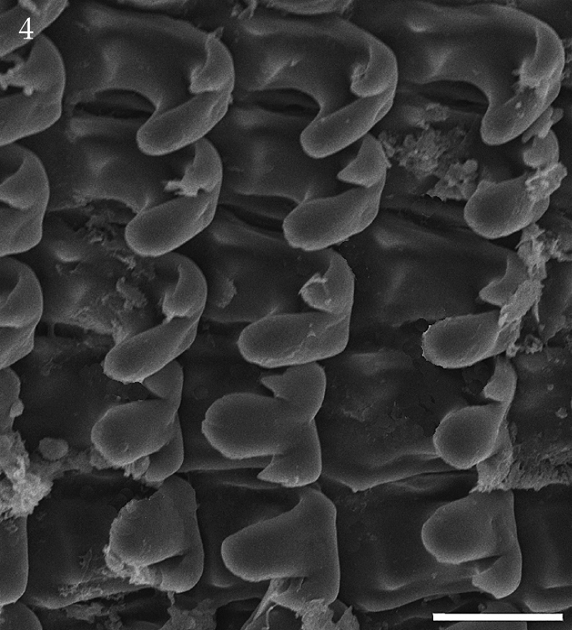
Radula: central tooth, with adjoining lateral teeth 1-3.

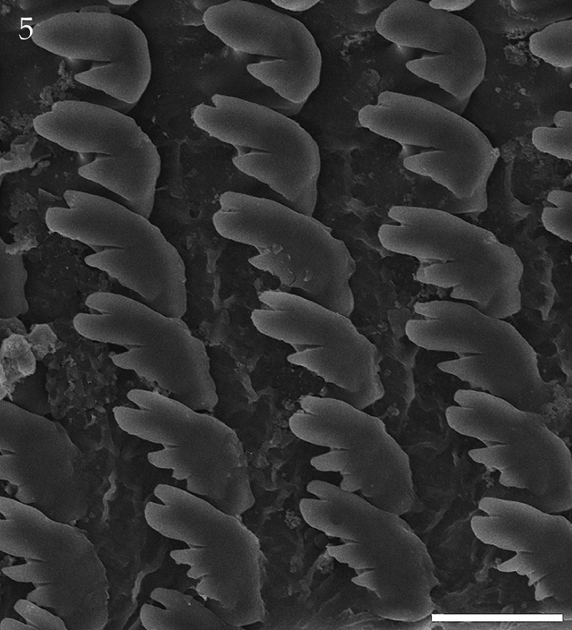
Radula: lateral tooth 7 and marginal teeth 1-5.

== Ecology ==
Leptacme cuongi is known to inhabit limestone areas.
