= Gnorismoneura zyzzogeton =

Scientific classification
- Kingdom: Animalia
- Phylum: Arthropoda
- Clade: Pancrustacea
- Class: Insecta
- Order: Lepidoptera
- Family: Tortricidae
- Genus: Gnorismoneura
- Species: G. zyzzogeton

Binomial name
- Gnorismoneura zyzzogeton Razowski, 1977

Species of moth

Gnorismoneura zyzzogeton is a species of moth of the family Tortricidae. It is found in Zhejiang, China.
