= Gnorismoneura monofascia =

Scientific classification
- Kingdom: Animalia
- Phylum: Arthropoda
- Clade: Pancrustacea
- Class: Insecta
- Order: Lepidoptera
- Family: Tortricidae
- Genus: Gnorismoneura
- Species: G. monofascia

Binomial name
- Gnorismoneura monofascia Razowski, 2008

Species of moth

Gnorismoneura monofascia is a moth of the family Tortricidae. It is found in Vietnam.

The wingspan is 14 mm.
