= Gnorismoneura tragoditis =

Scientific classification
- Kingdom: Animalia
- Phylum: Arthropoda
- Clade: Pancrustacea
- Class: Insecta
- Order: Lepidoptera
- Family: Tortricidae
- Genus: Gnorismoneura
- Species: G. tragoditis

Binomial name
- Gnorismoneura tragoditis (Meyrick, in Caradja & Meyrick, 1935)

Synonyms
- Capua tragoditis Meyrick, in Caradja & Meyrick, 1935

Species of moth

Gnorismoneura tragoditis is a species of moth of the family Tortricidae. It is found in Zhejiang, China.
