= Gnorismoneura mesoloba =

Scientific classification
- Kingdom: Animalia
- Phylum: Arthropoda
- Clade: Pancrustacea
- Class: Insecta
- Order: Lepidoptera
- Family: Tortricidae
- Genus: Gnorismoneura
- Species: G. mesoloba

Binomial name
- Gnorismoneura mesoloba (Meyrick in Caradja & Meyrick, 1937)

Synonyms
- Capua mesoloba Meyrick in Caradja & Meyrick, 1937

Species of moth

Gnorismoneura mesoloba is a species of moth of the family Tortricidae. It is found in Yunnan, China.
