= Gnorismoneura exulis =

Scientific classification
- Kingdom: Animalia
- Phylum: Arthropoda
- Clade: Pancrustacea
- Class: Insecta
- Order: Lepidoptera
- Family: Tortricidae
- Genus: Gnorismoneura
- Species: G. exulis

Binomial name
- Gnorismoneura exulis Issiki & Stringer, 1932

Species of moth

Gnorismoneura exulis is a moth of the family Tortricidae. It is found in Taiwan and Japan.
