= Gnorismoneura mesotoma =

Scientific classification
- Kingdom: Animalia
- Phylum: Arthropoda
- Clade: Pancrustacea
- Class: Insecta
- Order: Lepidoptera
- Family: Tortricidae
- Genus: Gnorismoneura
- Species: G. mesotoma

Binomial name
- Gnorismoneura mesotoma (Yasuda, 1975)

Synonyms
- Epagoge mesotoma Yasuda, 1975

Species of moth

Gnorismoneura mesotoma is a species of moth of the family Tortricidae. It is found in Japan (the island of Shikoku) and Korea.

The wingspan is 14–18 mm.

The larvae have been recorded feeding on the dead leaves of Quercus cerris.
