= Gnorismoneura elegantica =

Scientific classification
- Kingdom: Animalia
- Phylum: Arthropoda
- Clade: Pancrustacea
- Class: Insecta
- Order: Lepidoptera
- Family: Tortricidae
- Genus: Gnorismoneura
- Species: G. elegantica

Binomial name
- Gnorismoneura elegantica Razowski, 2008

Species of moth

Gnorismoneura elegantica is a moth of the family Tortricidae. It is found in Vietnam.

The wingspan is 16 mm.

== Etymology ==
The specific epithet refers is derived from Latin elegans (meaning elegant).
