= Gnorismoneura micronca =

Scientific classification
- Kingdom: Animalia
- Phylum: Arthropoda
- Clade: Pancrustacea
- Class: Insecta
- Order: Lepidoptera
- Family: Tortricidae
- Genus: Gnorismoneura
- Species: G. micronca

Binomial name
- Gnorismoneura micronca (Meyrick, 1937)

Synonyms
- Capua micronca Meyrick, 1937

Species of moth

Gnorismoneura micronca is a species of moth of the family Tortricidae. It is found in Yunnan, China.
