= Gnorismoneura =

Scientific classification
- Kingdom: Animalia
- Phylum: Arthropoda
- Class: Insecta
- Order: Lepidoptera
- Family: Tortricidae
- Tribe: Archipini
- Genus: Gnorismoneura; Issiki & Stringer, 1932

Genus of tortrix moths

Gnorismoneura is a genus of moths belonging to the subfamily Tortricinae of the family Tortricidae.

== Species ==
- Gnorismoneura brunneochroa Razowski, 2008
- Gnorismoneura calyptrimorpha Razowski, 2008
- Gnorismoneura chyta Razowski, 2008
- Gnorismoneura cylindrata Wang Li & Wang, 2004
- Gnorismoneura elegantica Razowski, 2008
- Gnorismoneura exulis Issiki & Stringer, 1932
- Gnorismoneura grandiprocessa Wang Li & Wang, 2004
- Gnorismoneura hoshinoi (Kawabe, 1964)
- Gnorismoneura maichau Razowski, 2008
- Gnorismoneura mesoloba (Meyrick in Caradja & Meyrick, 1937)
- Gnorismoneura mesotoma (Yasuda, 1975)
- Gnorismoneura micronca (Meyrick, 1937)
- Gnorismoneura monofascia Razowski, 2008
- Gnorismoneura orientis (Filipjev, 1962)
- Gnorismoneura prochyta (Meyrick, 1908)
- Gnorismoneura quadrativalvata Wang Li & Wang, 2004
- Gnorismoneura serrata Wang Li & Wang, 2004
- Gnorismoneura silvatica Razowski, 2008
- Gnorismoneura stereomorpha (Meyrick, in Caradja, 1931)
- Gnorismoneura taeniodesma (Meyrick, 1934)
- Gnorismoneura tragoditis (Meyrick, in Caradja & Meyrick, 1935)
- Gnorismoneura vallifica (Meyrick, in Caradja & Meyrick, 1935)
- Gnorismoneura zetessima Razowski, 1977
- Gnorismoneura zyzzogeton Razowski, 1977

== See also ==
- List of Tortricidae genera
