= Gnorismoneura cylindrata =

Scientific classification
- Kingdom: Animalia
- Phylum: Arthropoda
- Clade: Pancrustacea
- Class: Insecta
- Order: Lepidoptera
- Family: Tortricidae
- Genus: Gnorismoneura
- Species: G. cylindrata

Binomial name
- Gnorismoneura cylindrata Wang Li & Wang, 2004

Species of moth

Gnorismoneura cylindrata is a moth of the family Tortricidae. It is found in China.

The wingspan is 12–13.5 mm for males and 15–18 mm for females.
