= Gnorismoneura grandiprocessa =

Scientific classification
- Kingdom: Animalia
- Phylum: Arthropoda
- Clade: Pancrustacea
- Class: Insecta
- Order: Lepidoptera
- Family: Tortricidae
- Genus: Gnorismoneura
- Species: G. grandiprocessa

Binomial name
- Gnorismoneura grandiprocessa Wang Li & Wang, 2004

Species of moth

Gnorismoneura grandiprocessa is a moth of the family Tortricidae. It is found in China.
