= Gnorismoneura calyptrimorpha =

Scientific classification
- Kingdom: Animalia
- Phylum: Arthropoda
- Clade: Pancrustacea
- Class: Insecta
- Order: Lepidoptera
- Family: Tortricidae
- Genus: Gnorismoneura
- Species: G. calyptrimorpha

Binomial name
- Gnorismoneura calyptrimorpha Razowski, 2008

Species of moth

Gnorismoneura calyptrimorpha is a moth of the family Tortricidae. It is found in Vietnam.

The wingspan is 16 mm for males and 17 mm for females.

== Etymology ==
The specific epithet is derived from Greek calyptra (meaning a cover) and morphe (meaning shape).
