= Gnorismoneura hoshinoi =

Scientific classification
- Kingdom: Animalia
- Phylum: Arthropoda
- Clade: Pancrustacea
- Class: Insecta
- Order: Lepidoptera
- Family: Tortricidae
- Genus: Gnorismoneura
- Species: G. hoshinoi

Binomial name
- Gnorismoneura hoshinoi (Kawabe, 1964)

Synonyms
- Hastula hoshinoi Kawabe, 1964

Species of moth

Gnorismoneura hoshinoi is a species of moth of the family Tortricidae. It is found in Japan (the island of Honshu), Korea and China.

The wingspan is 13–17 mm.
