= Gnorismoneura taeniodesma =

Scientific classification
- Kingdom: Animalia
- Phylum: Arthropoda
- Clade: Pancrustacea
- Class: Insecta
- Order: Lepidoptera
- Family: Tortricidae
- Genus: Gnorismoneura
- Species: G. taeniodesma

Binomial name
- Gnorismoneura taeniodesma (Meyrick, 1934)

Synonyms
- Capua taeniodesma Meyrick, 1934

Species of moth

Gnorismoneura taeniodesma is a moth of the family Tortricidae. It is found in China.

The wingspan is 16.5–18 mm for females.
