= Gnorismoneura vallifica =

Scientific classification
- Kingdom: Animalia
- Phylum: Arthropoda
- Clade: Pancrustacea
- Class: Insecta
- Order: Lepidoptera
- Family: Tortricidae
- Genus: Gnorismoneura
- Species: G. vallifica

Binomial name
- Gnorismoneura vallifica (Meyrick, in Caradja & Meyrick, 1935)

Synonyms
- Homona vallifica Meyrick, in Caradja & Meyrick, 1935

Species of moth

Gnorismoneura vallifica is a species of moth of the family Tortricidae. It is found in Japan and in China's Zhejiang province.

Its wingspan is 16–20 mm.
