= Gnorismoneura orientis =

Scientific classification
- Kingdom: Animalia
- Phylum: Arthropoda
- Clade: Pancrustacea
- Class: Insecta
- Order: Lepidoptera
- Family: Tortricidae
- Genus: Gnorismoneura
- Species: G. orientis

Binomial name
- Gnorismoneura orientis (Filipjev, 1962)

Synonyms
- Epagoge orientis Filipjev, 1962; Gnorismoneura orinetis Liu & Li, 2002

Species of moth

Gnorismoneura orientis is a species of moth in the family Tortricidae, described by Ivan Nikolayevich Filipjev in 1962. It is found in China (Heilongjiang, Liaoning, Shanxi and Shandong) and Russia (Ussuri).

The wingspan is about 16 mm.
