= Lạc Sơn, Phú Thọ =

Lạc Sơn commune Xã Lạc Sơn Phố Vụ Bản Xã Liên Vũ
- Commune
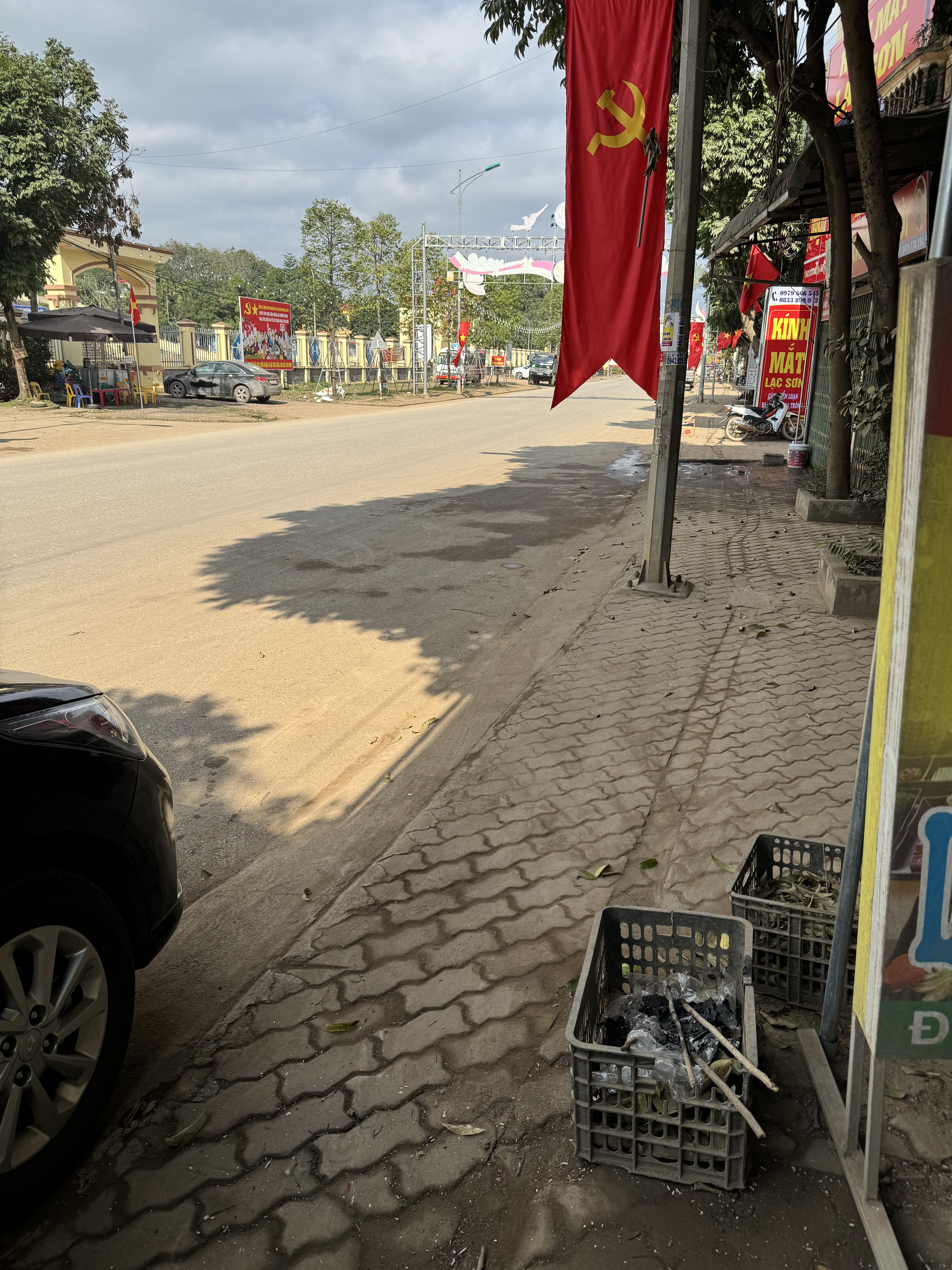
- A corner of Vụ Bản Township in February 2, 2024.
- Interactive map outlining Vụ Bản Township.
- Location within Vietnam Location within Southeast Asia Location within Asia
- Coordinates: 20°27′44.74″N 105°26′41.58″E
- Country: Vietnam
- Region: Northwest
- Province: Phú Thọ
- Establishment: 1957
- Central hall: No.1, National Route 12B, Vụ Bản Township

Government
  - Type: Township
  - People Committee's Chairman: Bùi Văn Giang
  - People Council's Chairman: Bùi Thị Minh
  - Front Committee's Chairman: Trương Thị Hương
  - Party Committee's Secretary: Phạm Hồng Đức

Area
  - Total: 13.57 km^{2} (5.24 sq mi)

Population (2019)
  - Total: 9,497
  - Density: 700/km^{2} (1,800/sq mi)
  - Ethnicities: Mươ̒ng; Kinh; Tanka
- Time zone: UTC+7 (Indochina Time)
- ZIP code: 36606 (Note: An official code from December 31, 2022, to present.)
- Website: ThitranVuban.Hoabinh.gov.vn

Lạc Sơn is a commune of Phú Thọ province in Vietnam.

On June 16, 2025, the Standing Committee of the National Assembly issued Resolution No. 1660/NQ-UBTVQH15 on the reorganization of commune-level administrative units in Phú Thọ Province in 2025 (the resolution took effect on the date of its adoption). Accordingly, the entire natural area and population of Vụ Bản Township, Hương Nhượng Commune, and Vũ Bình Commune were consolidated to establish a new commune named Lạc Sơn Commune.

== History ==
Vụ Bản Township was formed in the 1950s where based on the merger of Vụ Bản Market and Liên Vũ Commune. Its name is often considered by people from Vụ Bản Rural District to commemorate their roots, but perhaps this group is only the mainstream, not all.

Vụ Bản Market was established at the most fierce period of the land reform movement in the North Vietnam. Because of not bearing the brutal atmosphere in the locality, the people of the Red River Delta went to the mountains to flee, because more or less this area still enjoyed a more free life.

To meet the criteria of the plan for arrangement and merger of administrative units, according to the Decision of the Hòa Bình Provincial People's Committee, which was issued in April 2025, from 12:00am on September 1 of the same year, Vụ Bản Township was no longer the capital of Lạc Sơn Rural District but became a commune-level administrative unit (Note: A highest level of Vietnamese locals from September 1, 2025.) of the province.

== See also ==
- Lạc Sơn District
- Vụ Bản District
