= Gnorismoneura zetessima =

Scientific classification
- Kingdom: Animalia
- Phylum: Arthropoda
- Clade: Pancrustacea
- Class: Insecta
- Order: Lepidoptera
- Family: Tortricidae
- Genus: Gnorismoneura
- Species: G. zetessima

Binomial name
- Gnorismoneura zetessima Razowski, 1977

Species of moth

Gnorismoneura zetessima is a moth of the family Tortricidae. It is found in China.

The wingspan is 18.5–21 mm for females.
