= Gnorismoneura prochyta =

Scientific classification
- Kingdom: Animalia
- Phylum: Arthropoda
- Clade: Pancrustacea
- Class: Insecta
- Order: Lepidoptera
- Family: Tortricidae
- Genus: Gnorismoneura
- Species: G. prochyta

Binomial name
- Gnorismoneura prochyta (Meyrick, 1908)

Synonyms
- Epagoge prochyta Meyrick, 1908

Species of moth

Gnorismoneura prochyta is a moth of the family Tortricidae. It is found in India and Vietnam.
