= Gnorismoneura stereomorpha =

Scientific classification
- Kingdom: Animalia
- Phylum: Arthropoda
- Clade: Pancrustacea
- Class: Insecta
- Order: Lepidoptera
- Family: Tortricidae
- Genus: Gnorismoneura
- Species: G. stereomorpha

Binomial name
- Gnorismoneura stereomorpha (Meyrick, in Caradja, 1931)

Synonyms
- Capua stereomorpha Meyrick, in Caradja, 1931

Species of moth

Gnorismoneura stereomorpha is a species of moth of the family Tortricidae. It is found in Sichuan, China.
