= Muong people =

Ethnic group of Northern Vietnam

Mường
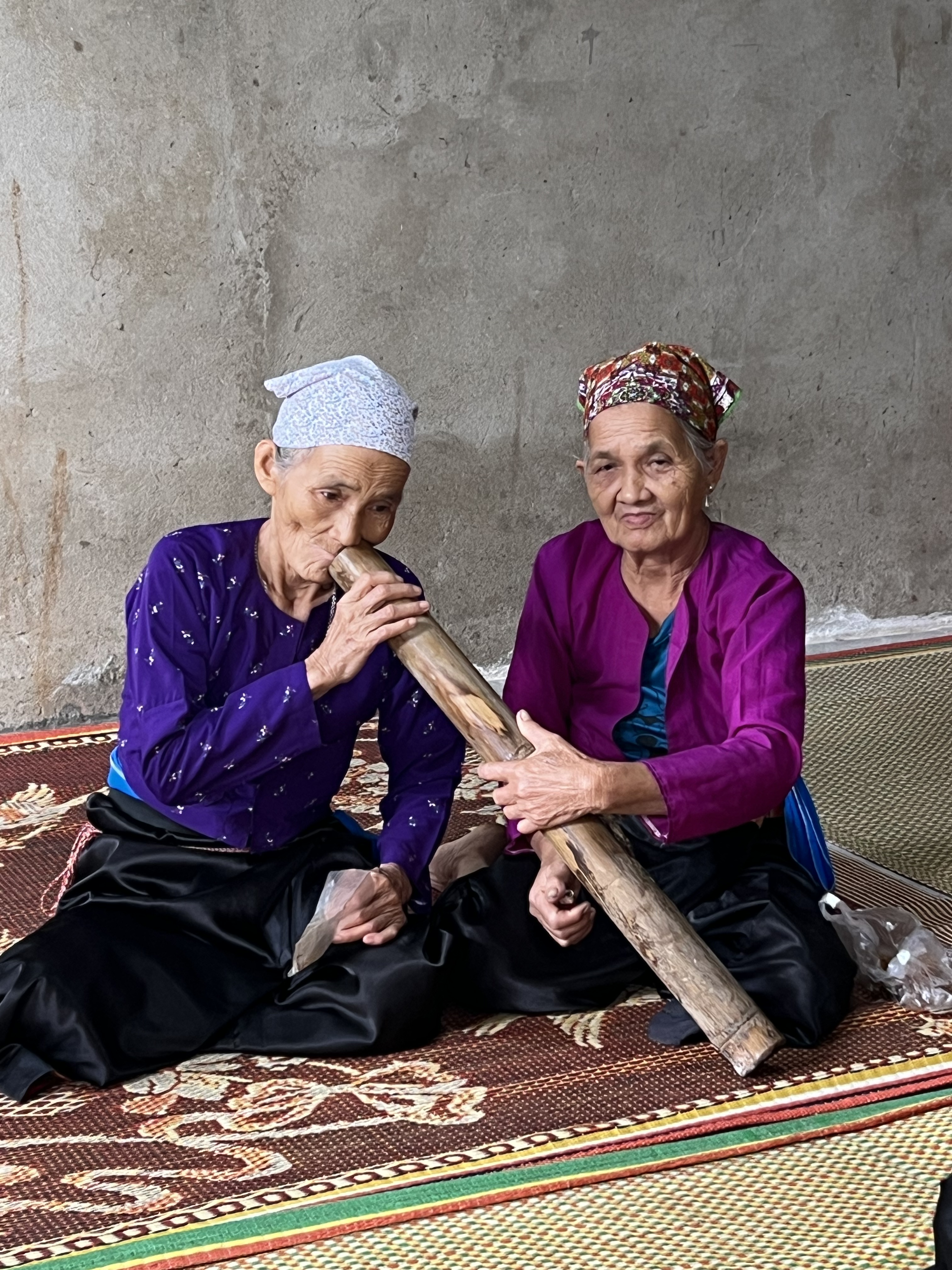
- Two elderly Muong people smoking tobacco at a wedding ceremony in Lac Son District, Hoa Binh Province.

Total population
- 1,452,095; 1.51% of the Vietnamese population (2019)

Regions with significant populations
- Hòa Bình Province: 549,026
- Thanh Hóa Province: 376,340
- Phú Thọ Province: 218,404
- Sơn La Province: 84,676
- Hanoi: 62,239

Languages
- Mường • Vietnamese

Religion
- Mường folk religion • Mahayana Buddhism • Christianity (Vietnamese Hoà Bình Catholic sect of Catholic Church)

Related ethnic groups
- Other Vietic groups (Viet, Gin, Chứt, Thổ peoples)

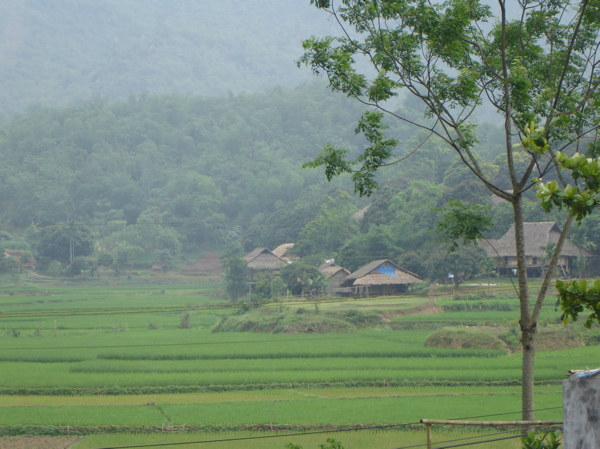
Mường Settlement with traditional houses near Hòa Bình (2007)

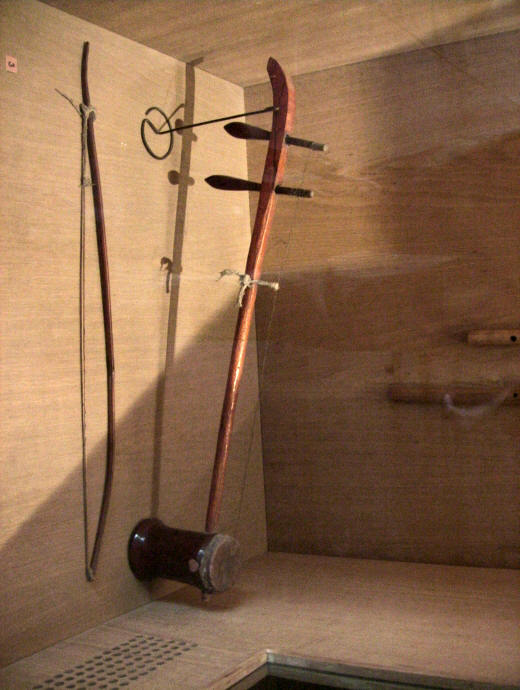
Cò ke - a musical instrument from the Mường people

The Mường (Mường: mõl Mường; Vietnamese: người Mường) are an ethnic group native to northern Vietnam. The Mường is the country's third largest of 53 minority groups, with an estimated population of 1.45 million (according to the 2019 census). The Mường people inhabit a mountainous region of northern Vietnam centered in Hòa Bình Province and some districts of Phú Thọ province and Thanh Hóa Province. They speak the Mường language which is related to the Vietnamese language and the Thổ language and share ancient ethnic roots with the Vietnamese (Kinh) people.

== Etymology ==
The word Mường in Vietnamese is etymologically related to the word mueang from the Tai languages, meaning "cultivated land" or "community", and referred to pre-modern semi-independent city-states or principalities in mainland Southeast Asia. This comes from their close association with the Tai peoples. The Mường call the Tai as ɲew, Nyo or Âu; while referring to themselves by various names, such as "Monglong", which means "people living in the center", to distinguish themselves from the people of the valleys and of the highlands. In Hòa Bình, They call themselves Mõl or Moăn. In Thanh Hóa, they call themselves Mon or Mwanl and in Phú Thọ Province, they call themselves Mon or Monl. Sometimes written as Mal, Mwal or Mwai. These words are all dialectal variations on the Mường word for "people". From Vietnamese perspective in the past, the word mọi is "an old word to denote ethnic minorities, [in] distant regions, [and] backward", even though it is cognate with the Mường word mõl "human being", and both the Vietnamese and Mường words come from one same Proto-Vietic *mɔːlʔ. Among different groups of people of Northern Vietnam, both the Vietnamese and the Mường are referred to by some other common designations such as Cheo (Cheo Chi) or Keo are derivations from Giao Chỉ, the name of Northern Vietnam during the First Era of Northern Domination. These designations are used by Tai-speaking people in Vietnam.

The Mường were referred in Vietnamese Nôm texts as Mường Mán (茫蠻), which was used in a derogatory sense in the past.

== History ==
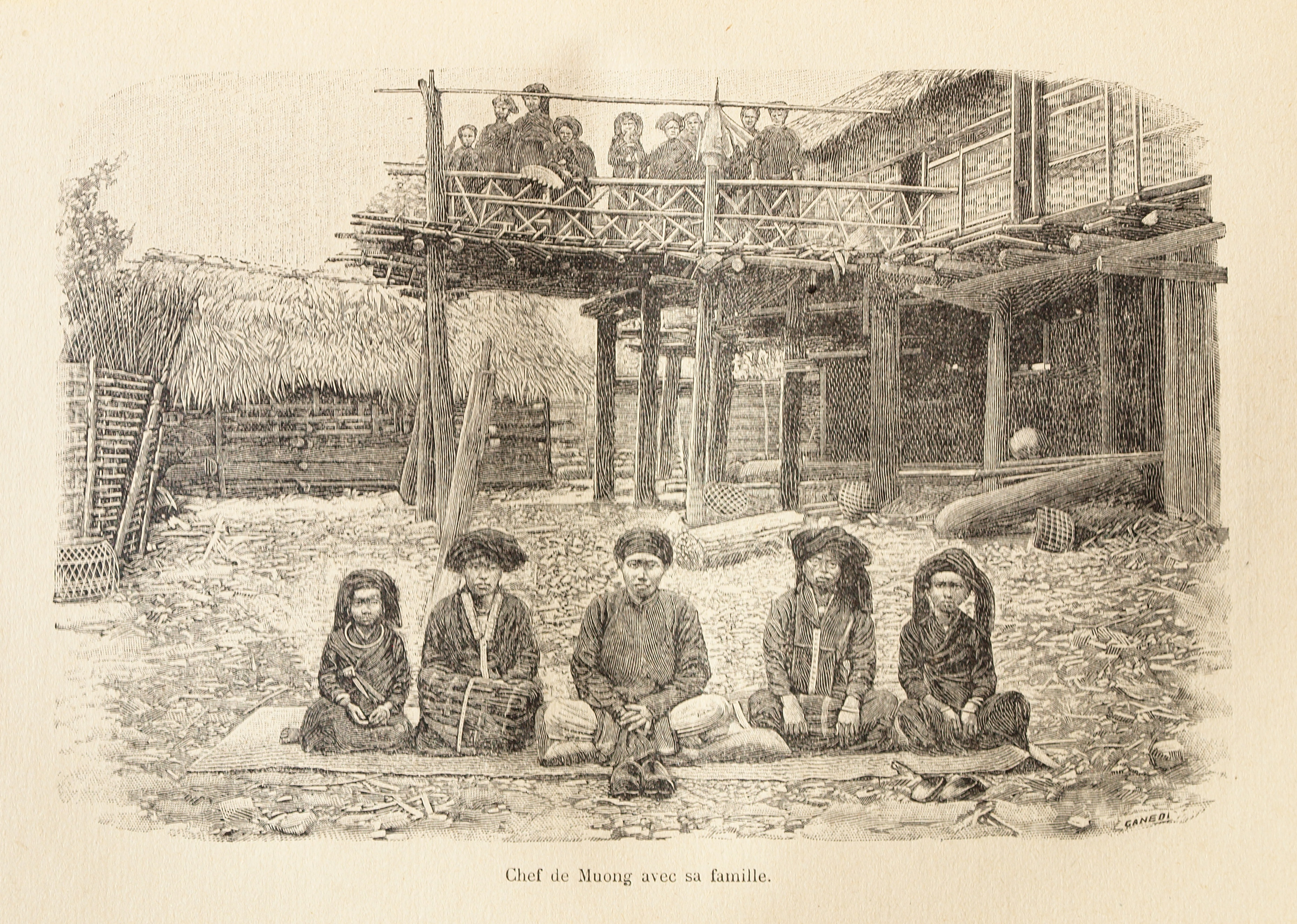
A Mường family in 1899

From an anthropologist viewpoint, both the Mường and the Vietnamese Kinh are descended from common origins-the ancient Viet-Muong speakers-the northern subbranch of the Vietic ethnolinguistic group of the Austroasiatic family that had heavily contact with Tai-speaking people and other Northern Austroasiatic speakers during the first millennia. The Mường are often perceived as an intact culture, compared to the sinicized Vietnamese (Kinh) in the lowland, and they also tend to adopt and exchange many customs of the neighboring Black Tai.

Like other Zomia areas (highlands >300 meters) groups, for most of history, the Mường were neither under any regional pre-modern states' influence, both politically and culturally. Professor James C. Scott in his 2009 book The Art of Not Being Governed also included the abstract outlined by Keith Taylor and Patricia Pelley that "the Mường are popularly regarded as the pre-Sinitic version of the Việt." Although it has been little studied, scholarships believe that due to many plausible reasons, the ethnically and linguistically schism between Vietnamese and Mường speakers occurred during the seventh to ninth centuries AD, roughly during the period of Chinese Tang Empire's domination over Northern Vietnam. Taylor describes the end of Nanzhao-Tang war probably vis-a-vis with the Muong-Vietnamese schism. The Mường refer themselves by their variations of endonym Mol/Monl/Moan (people) and mwal tlong (inner people), while the term Mường is a mere xenonym used by the Vietnamese and then French administration implied that xenonym Mường to various Mường-speaking tribes into one single Mường ethnicity during the 1920s.

Historical records said there were Mường rebellions in 1029, 1300, 1351, 1430s, 1822, 1833, 1880s. In 1931, Mường population was 180,000, and it grew to 415,000 by 1960.

Presently, the Mường are one of the four main groups of Vietic speakers in Vietnam, the others being the Việt, Thổ and Chứt. The Nguồn, who are classified as Việt, are sometimes believed to be the southernmost group of the Mường, who intermixed with Chứt people.

== Mythology ==
The Mường epic Te tấc te đác (Vietnamese: Đẻ đất đẻ nước) traces their mythological ancestry to a legendary bird couple called Chim Ây (male bird) and Cái Ứa (female bird). In the Mường epic cycle the origins of all natural phenomena, the first people and then their cultural practices such as the acquisition of fire, building houses, producing silk, casting bronze drums, and weaving and embroidering, are related to the uplands. The first Mường people were living in a cave on the mountain Hang Hao from where their descendants resettled in all the other big and small villages (mường). Only one son of the first Mường parents, Dịt Dàng, or the king Việt, went down to lowlands to live and to build a capital city there with a palace and big market.

This place in the plains is named in the epic tales as Kinh Kỳ-Kẻ Chợ, i.e. the area of the capital city and market-place. In the Mường epic tales uplanders and lowlanders intensively interact with each other. For instance, they jointly cut down the huge tree of Chu ‘with its copper trunk and iron branches’ and together move it out of the mountains down to the plains.

In contrast to this, in the Vietnamese story of descent the capital city is located in an upland area, in Phong Châu. Here the eldest of the fifty sons who stayed in the mountains with their mother founded the capital of the first Vietnamese kingdom Văn Lang. Many depicted details of ancient life of the Vietnamese are also related to mountains: they use burnt ginger roots instead of salt that could be produced only by the sea; men cut their hair short to make it easier when moving in the forests; their lands are reserved mainly for cultivating glutinous rice which requires less water to grow than wet rice and could be easily cultivated on the hillsides; for some ritual purposes they prepare special dishes from this sort of rice such as rice cooked in bamboo tubes or stuffed steamed cakes (bánh chưng, bánh dầy). Forests in Vietnamese tradition are always associated with mountain areas as plains are reserved for paddy fields. Cutting hair was a custom specific for Việt (Yue) men in contrast to Han Chinese who had been keeping their hair long.

Stuffed steamed cakes similar to the Vietnamese bánh chưng and bánh dầy are also found in the cuisine of Zhuang people in Guangxi province, that again provokes associations between Tai and Viet-Muong cultural traditions.

== Language ==
The Mường speak the Mường language, a close relative of Vietnamese. Writing based on the Vietnamese alphabet appeared in the 20th century, introduced by Western scholars. The Mường aristocracy were already familiar with Chinese writing through their study of the Confucian canon.

The Mường language is mainly used in the domestic sphere of communication. Most native speakers also speak Vietnamese.

== Geographic distribution ==
The population of Mường in Vietnam was 1,452,095 according to the 2019 census, 1.51% of Vietnam's population. They mostly live in the north of Vietnam, mainly in the mountainous provinces of Hòa Bình (549,026 people, comprising 64.28% of the province's population), Thanh Hóa (376,340 people, comprising 10.34% of the province's population), Phú Thọ (218,404 people, comprising 14.92% of the province's population), and Sơn La (84,676 people, comprising 6.78% of the province's population). In Hòa Bình province, there are four large Mường population centers: Mường Vang (Lạc Sơn District), Mường Bi (Tân Lạc District), Mường Thàng (Cao Phong District) and Mường Động (Kim Bôi District).

== Economy ==
The Mường residents primarily grow wet rice and some of them also grow corn and cassava. Breeding is attached special importance to development. The main livestock is cattle and poultries. The significant economic resources of the Mường family are exploiting products of forest including mushrooms, wood ear, wood, bamboo, rattan, etc. The typical crafts of the Mường are weaving, knitting, reeling.

== Literature ==
The Mường people have many valuable epics (Mường: mo), such as Te tấc te đác (meaning Giving rise to the Earth and the Water).

== Holidays ==
The main holidays of the Mường are New Year and agrarian holidays. During the celebration of the New Year, Mường people pray to the ancestors. Such prayers are also arranged on the revolutionary holidays after which the whole village treats themselves to pre-cooked dishes.

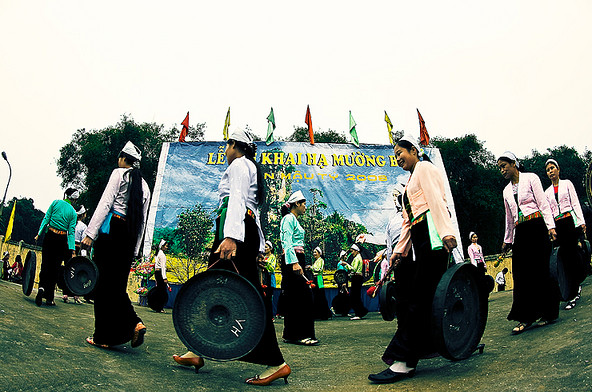

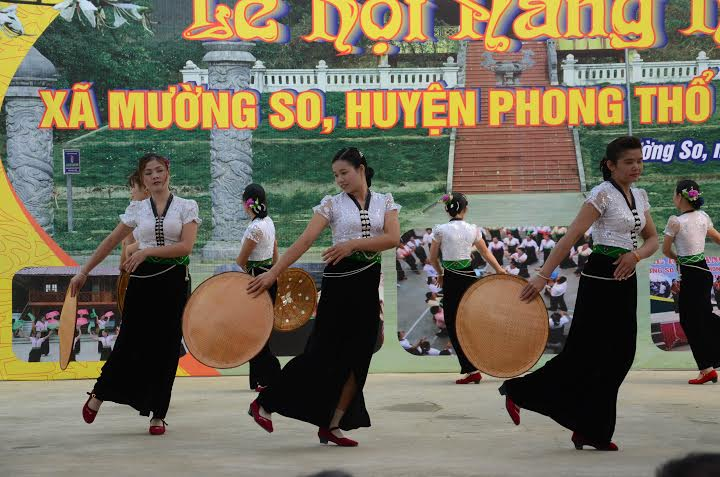

== Clothing ==
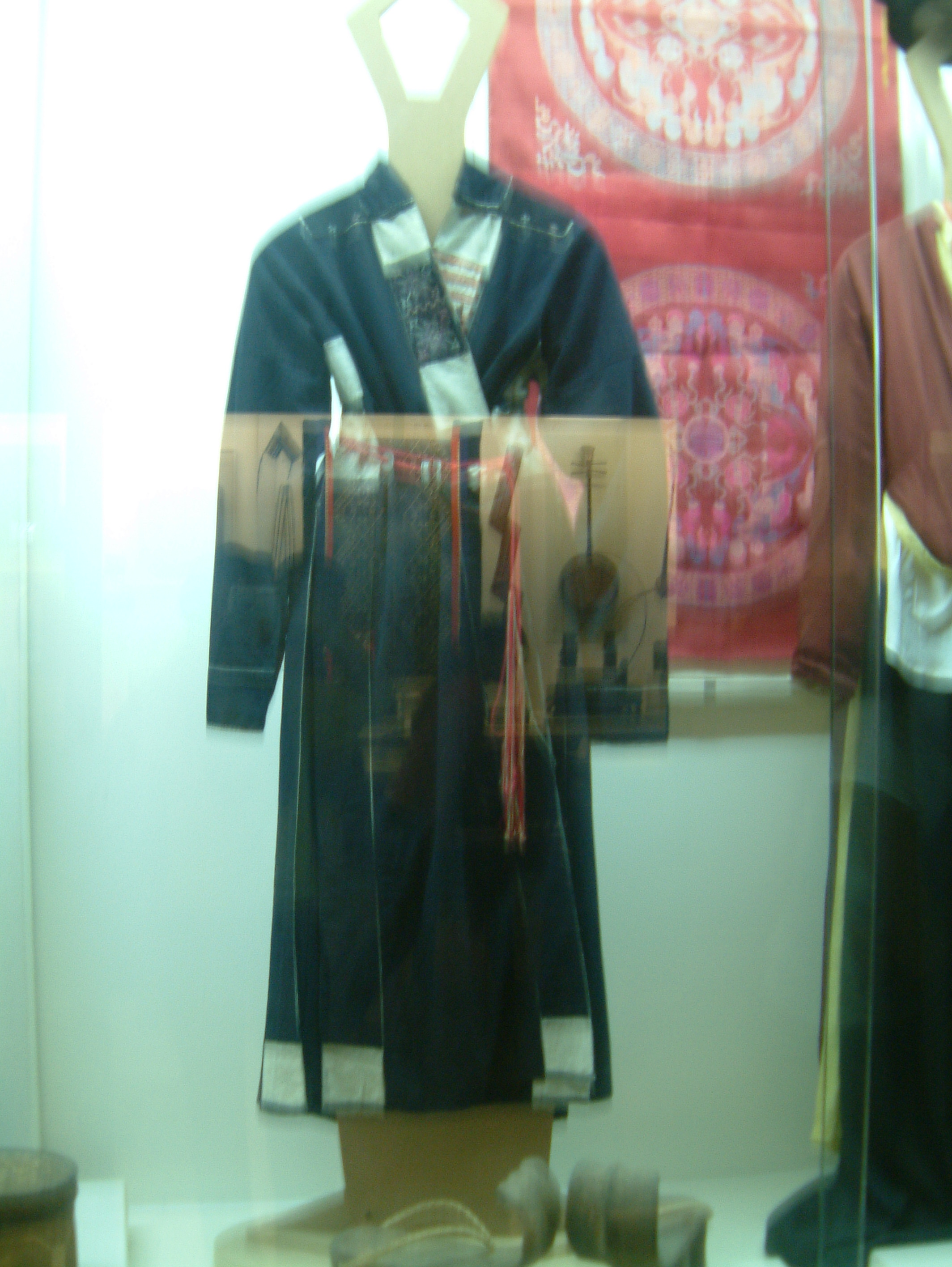
The traditional dress of the Mường people (photo from the Vietnamese Museum of Ethnic Studies)

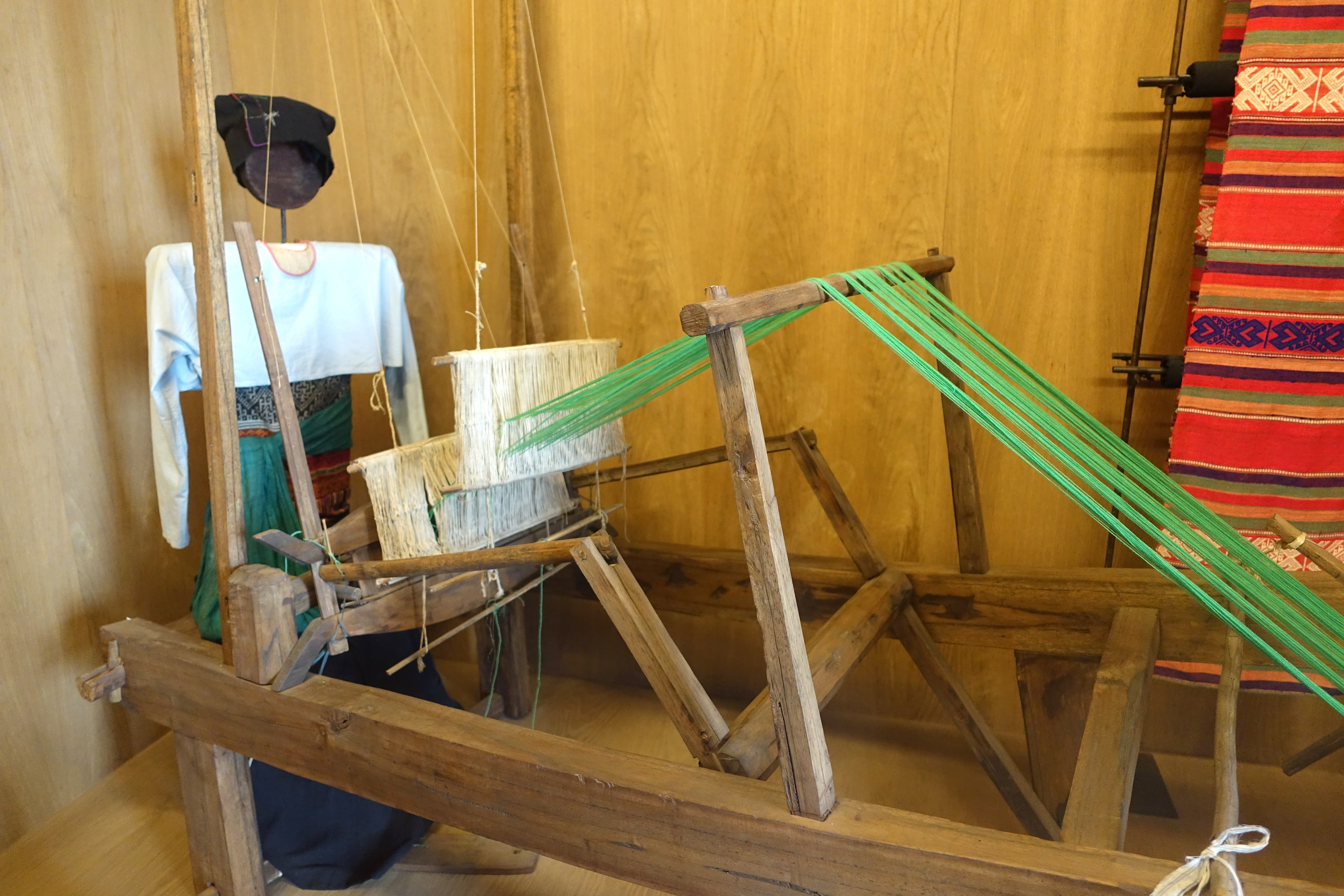
Weaving looms of the Mường people

Different Mường groups will wear different clothing styles. Some wear clothing borrowed from the Thái, while others wear clothing similar to the Vietnamese. In general, clothing for women consists of some type of tunic or robe, headscarf, and skirt. Some women in the past wore neck rings like other minorities in Northern Vietnam. Men generally wear simple tunics and pants.

== Religion ==
Mainly, the Mường follow Buddhism (possibly Theravada) and Christianity (Catholics), often with local animistic influences. They believe in the existence of harmful spirits (ma tai, ma em, and others).

The Mường practice their traditional ethnic religion, worshiping ancestral spirits and other supernatural deities. They are primarily animists, which means that they believe that non-living objects have spirits. They also deify local heroes who have died. However, with the introduction of modern medicine, adherence to many folk beliefs has declined.

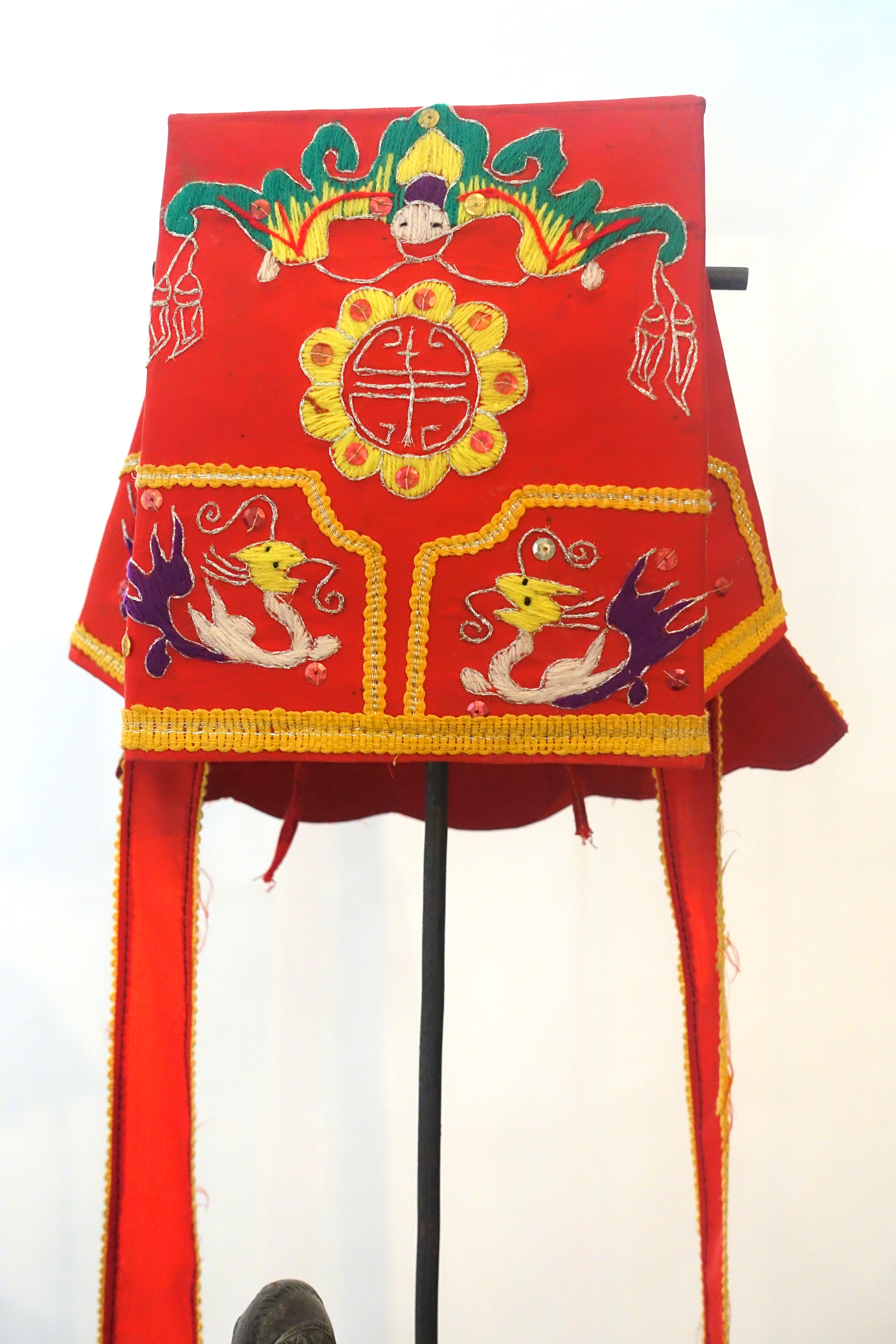
Mường shaman's hat

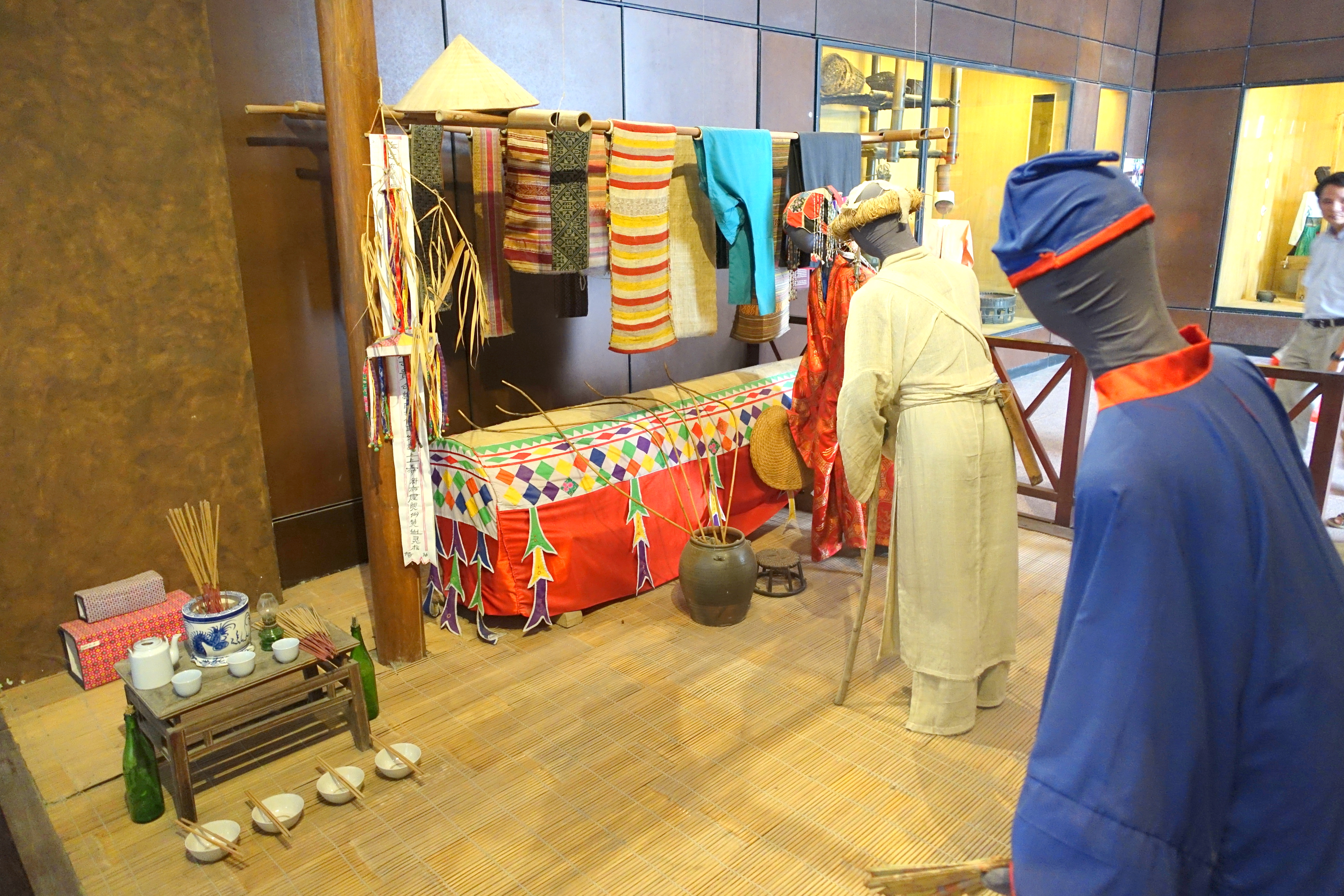
Mường funeral

== Genetics ==
Huang et al. (2022) found that Viet-Muong speakers, including ethnic Muong and Kinh people, genetically cluster with Kra-Dai speakers.

== See also ==
- Mường Autonomous Territory
- Mon people
