= Mai Châu district =

Coordinates: 20.667°N 105.000°E

Mai Châu district Phường Mai Châu
- Rural Ward
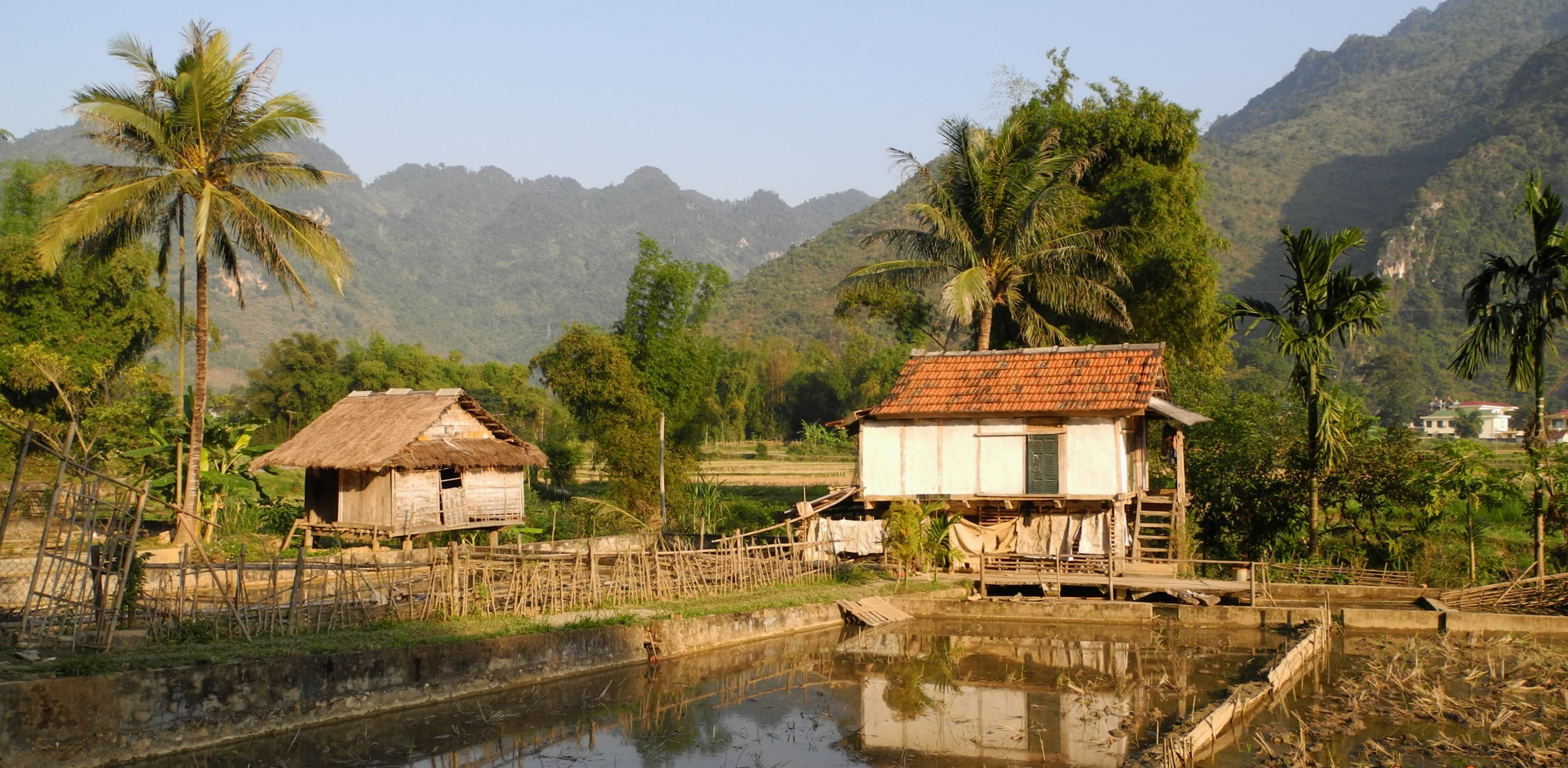
- Landscape of the Lác village-resort.
- Interactive map of Mai Châu district
- Country: Vietnam
- Region: Northwest
- Province: Phú Thọ
- Existence: VII century to August 30, 2025
- Central hall: M37M+V95, National Route 15, Mai Châu township

Government
  - Type: Rural district
  - People Committee's Chairman: Phạm Văn Hoàn
  - People Council's chairman: Hà Thị Dược
  - Front Committee's chairman: Sùng A Chênh
  - Party Committee's Secretary: Nguyễn Trần Anh

Area
  - Total: 564.54 km^{2} (217.97 sq mi)

Population (2019)
  - Total: 63,000
  - Density: 110/km^{2} (290/sq mi)
  - Ethnicities: Mường; Thái; Kinh; Tanka
- Time zone: UTC+7 (Indochina Time)
- ZIP code: 36400
- Website: Maichau.Hoabinh.gov.vn; Maichau.Hoabinh.dcs.vn

Mai Châu [maːj˧˥:ʨəw˧˥] is a former rural district of Phú Thọ province in the Northwest region of Vietnam.

== History ==
The place name of Mai Châu in Kinh administrative documents is originally from an older name in White Tai language to refer to the entire area of which is now Hòa Bình province and part of Sơn La province : Muaeng Maё, Muang Möi, Muang Mol, or Mường Muổi. It means "the land of the barbarians". This name may have been placed when the White Tai leaders started military forces into the territory of the Đà River junction and fought with indigenous tribes.

=== Middle Ages ===
Before the 7th century AD, the area where Mai Châu is now the place where the tribes are still called as "Xá people" ("xá" means "commune") by Annamese historians. In fact, they do not belong to any nation and do not share with the unified language. This discrete connection was the cause of the disaster in Tang Xuanzong period, when the Tai forces expanded to the South and causing a huge population decline in the current place is the Northwest of Vietnam.

The Xá people have basically been destroyed or assimilated in the upstream of Đà River, only a very small number of rugged mountains in the South of Hòa Bình province to survive. The whole process of destroying the Xá community has been thoroughly told in the two White Tai epics Táy-pú-xớc and Quắm-tố-mướng.

In the beginning of 15th century, Mường forces from the mountains of Thanh Hóa and Nghệ An rising and establishing the Early Lê dynasty in Đông Kinh indirectly saved the descendants of the Xá people from destroying. Mường has automatically became the official name for all non-Tai speaking communities in Hòa Bình province.

The characteristic of Mai Châu is flat, there are even many rivers and lakes, so it became a very similar agricultural area in the Red River Delta. That emptiness caused this rural district to be an important intersection of two groups White Tai and Mường.

=== XX century ===
Mường people in Mai Châu have the opportunity to interact with Tai people and some other groups would come to settle later, so they have received Tai scripts to record, and used Hanese characters to communicate with Kinh people. They soon abandoned the nomadic lifestyle to learn wet rice cultivation techniques, raised white pigs and even took the exams to be royal officials. This situation is contrary to what happened in the South of Hòa Bình province, where there are only the rugged mountain. Mường people in this area have very little opportunities to interact with the outside world so they do not know how to take notes, their voice was also very difficult to hear and the customs were still dark until the early 20th century. The main food of this group is corn and black pork. Therefore, before the French protection of Annam, the Nguyễn Dynasty divided the Mường people in Hòa Bình province into two independent groups, allowing each group to have its own chief (p'tao, phìa tạo, "leader") and enjoy the dignity regime. They included of Mai Châu and Lạc Sơn.

That distinction also affected the attitude of cooperation with North Vietnamese political institutions after 1945. In 1947, White Tai and Mường people in Mai Châu became the priority object in the establishment of Muong Autonomous Region. Muong battalion was founded in the French Union Forces, then became one of the elite units of the Vietnam National Army. In that context, the Mường group in Lạc Sơn relied on high mountains to conduct resistance. The communist government was still maintained in some remote communes.

After the French withdrew from Vietnam, Mai Châu district maintained an autonomous regime, so it was not affected by the devastating land reform. During the Vietnam War, it was even a granary to save hunger whenever the cooperatives of the North could not pay enough food.

Starting in the 1970s, Mai Châu was piloted as a rural resort with the advice of Soviet Union and East Germany experts. The central government has allowed Mai Châu to develop traditional textile industry, rice cultivation and pig raising in the context of strict subsidy policies still applied across the country. In schools, French was returned to the third language since 1986, that is, after Vietnamese and the native language.

=== XXI century ===
Mai Châu rural district was one of the important eco-tourism areas not only in Vietnam but also Southeast Asia. According to the orientation from 2025 to 2035, Mai Châu rural district will be mobilized by the Provincial People's Committee to all capital sources to turn the Southwestern composition of Hòa Bình new city. The rural district regulation will be also replaced by urban districts.

== Geography ==
=== Topography ===
Mai Châu is a mountainous region located in Hòa Bình province, approximately 135 km from Hanoi and 65 km from Hòa Bình city.

The east of Mai Châu borders Đà Bắc and Tân Lạc districts, the west and the south border Quan Hóa district of Thanh Hóa province, and the north borders Vân Hồ district of Sơn La province. Mai Châu's terrain is quite complex, divided by slits, streams and high mountains.

According to the topographic characteristics, Mai Châu can be divided into two distinct areas : the low region (relatively flat terrain with fertile soil) and the high region (with many high and rugged mountain ranges).

The district covers an area of 520 km^{2} (200 sq mi). The district capital is the town of Mai Châu. The scenery attracts many tourists.

== Climate ==
Climate data for Mai Châu
Month	Jan	Feb	Mar	Apr	May	Jun	Jul	Aug	Sep	Oct	Nov	Dec	Year
Record high °C (°F)	36.0 (96.8)	37.0 (98.6)	39.0 (102.2)	40.6 (105.1)	41.8 (107.2)	41.0 (105.8)	40.6 (105.1)	37.8 (100.0)	37.4 (99.3)	37.2 (99.0)	36.0 (96.8)	33.4 (92.1)	41.8 (107.2)
Mean daily maximum °C (°F)	24.6 (76.3)	26.7 (80.1)	29.5 (85.1)	32.2 (90.0)	32.6 (90.7)	31.7 (89.1)	31.4 (88.5)	30.7 (87.3)	30.1 (86.2)	28.8 (83.8)	26.8 (80.2)	24.6 (76.3)	29.1 (84.4)
Daily mean °C (°F)	18.4 (65.1)	20.2 (68.4)	22.7 (72.9)	25.5 (77.9)	26.5 (79.7)	26.6 (79.9)	26.4 (79.5)	25.9 (78.6)	25.1 (77.2)	23.6 (74.5)	21.4 (70.5)	19.0 (66.2)	23.4 (74.1)
Mean daily minimum °C (°F)	15.7 (60.3)	17.0 (62.6)	19.1 (66.4)	21.5 (70.7)	22.7 (72.9)	23.1 (73.6)	23.0 (73.4)	22.8 (73.0)	22.1 (71.8)	20.6 (69.1)	18.6 (65.5)	16.4 (61.5)	20.2 (68.4)
Record low °C (°F)	1.9 (35.4)	5.0 (41.0)	7.2 (45.0)	12.5 (54.5)	—	18.6 (65.5)	19.6 (67.3)	22.1 (71.8)	16.6 (61.9)	11.1 (52.0)	6.4 (43.5)	2.0 (35.6)	1.9 (35.4)
Average rainfall mm (inches)	14.5 (0.57)	12.8 (0.50)	29.0 (1.14)	94.8 (3.73)	194.4 (7.65)	250.9 (9.88)	316.2 (12.45)	337.5 (13.29)	288.9 (11.37)	171.5 (6.75)	36.4 (1.43)	11.1 (0.44)	1,756 (69.13)
Average rainy days	3.2	3.0	5.4	11.0	16.4	17.2	18.8	18.6	14.2	10.9	5.5	2.8	127.1
Average relative humidity (%)	79.9	79.0	79.2	79.5	80.3	81.6	83.3	85.6	85.2	83.4	81.3	79.6	81.5
Mean monthly sunshine hours	84.8	78.6	98.7	129.5	170.2	148.3	153.4	144.4	140.7	124.8	115.0	109.6	1,494
Source: Vietnam Institute for Building Science and Technology

=== Demography ===
In 2003, this rural district had a population of 48,570. Most of the district residents are White Tai people, the rest are Mường and Kinh people in almost balanced quantities. The number of other ethnic groups is negligible.

== Culture ==
The Ban Lac people have Thai ancestors that settled in northwestern Vietnam. The two tribes, White Thai and Black Thai, settled in the same area and make up the largest ethnic population of the region.

=== Architecture ===
The Mai Châu area is well known for its stilt houses. The type of stilt houses, or pile dwellings, they construct are called Thai stilt houses and are made of bamboo and timber. These houses are elevated 3.0–3.7 metres (10–12 ft) off the ground to avoid water damage and shelter animals from the elements.

=== Landscapes ===
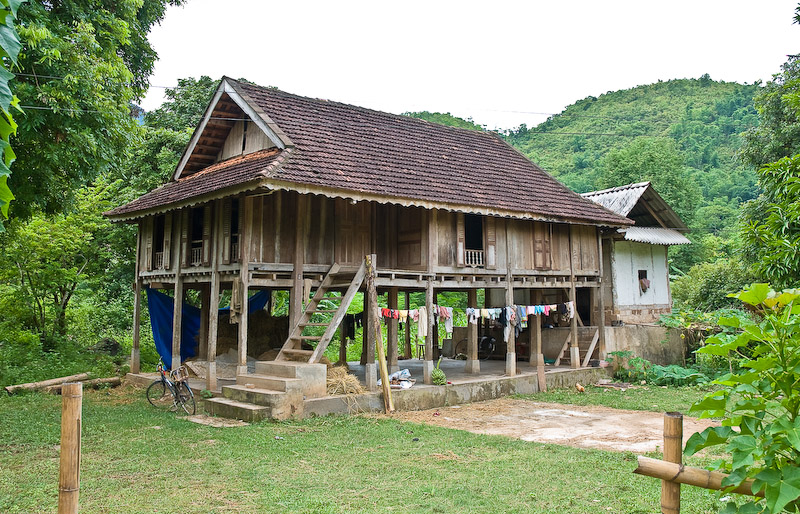
Tai stilt house

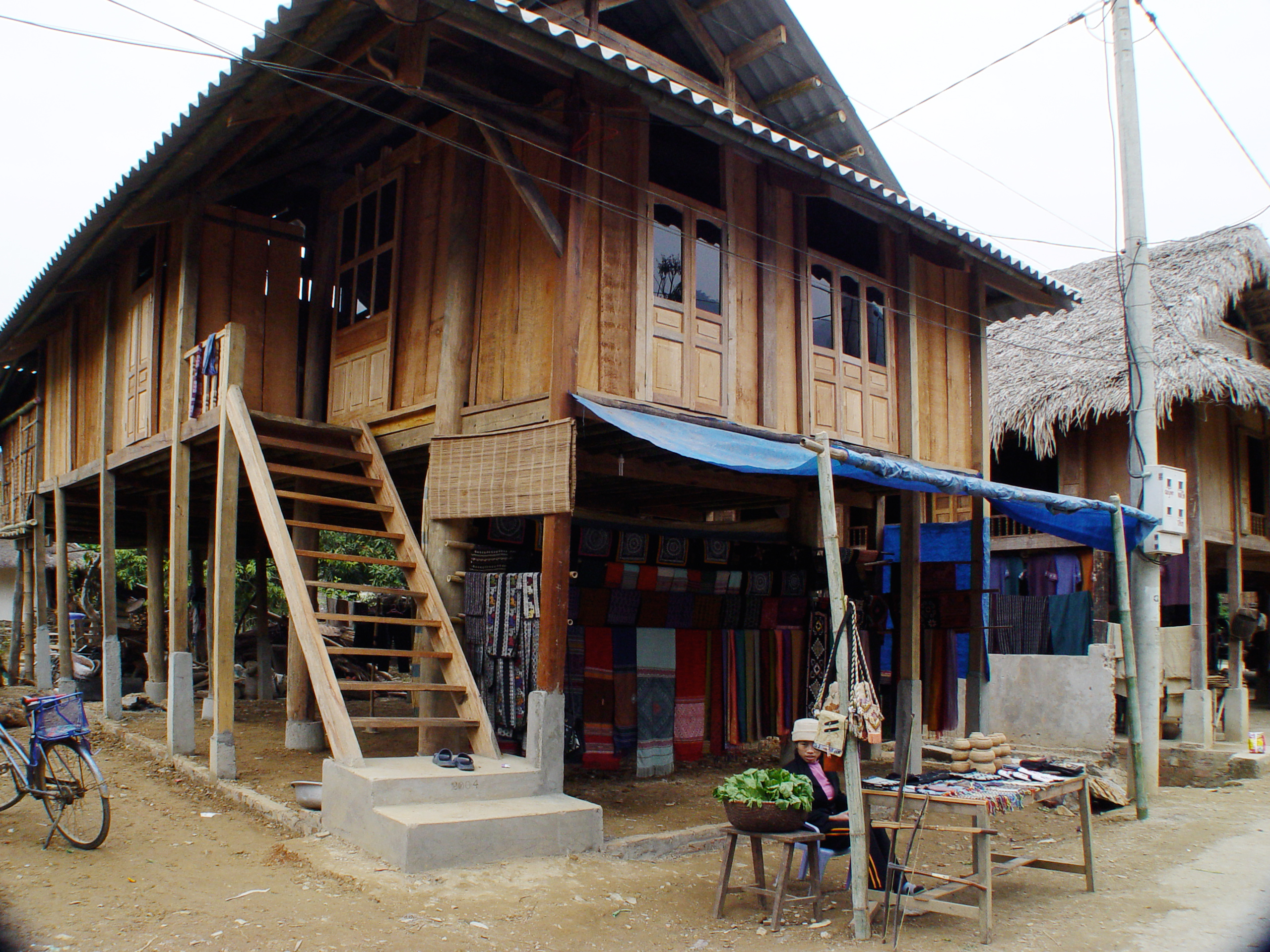
Stick house construction

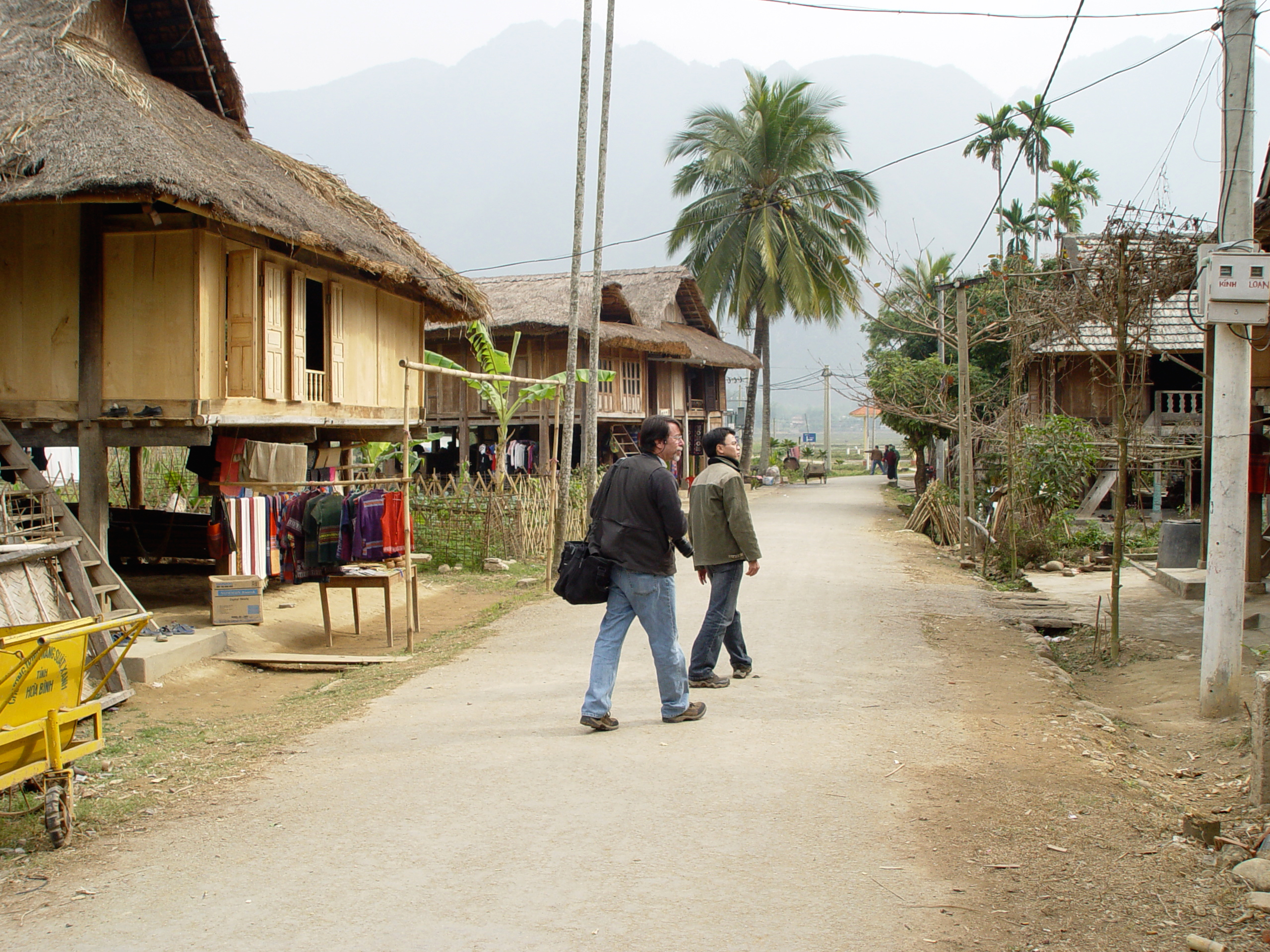
Stilt house construction

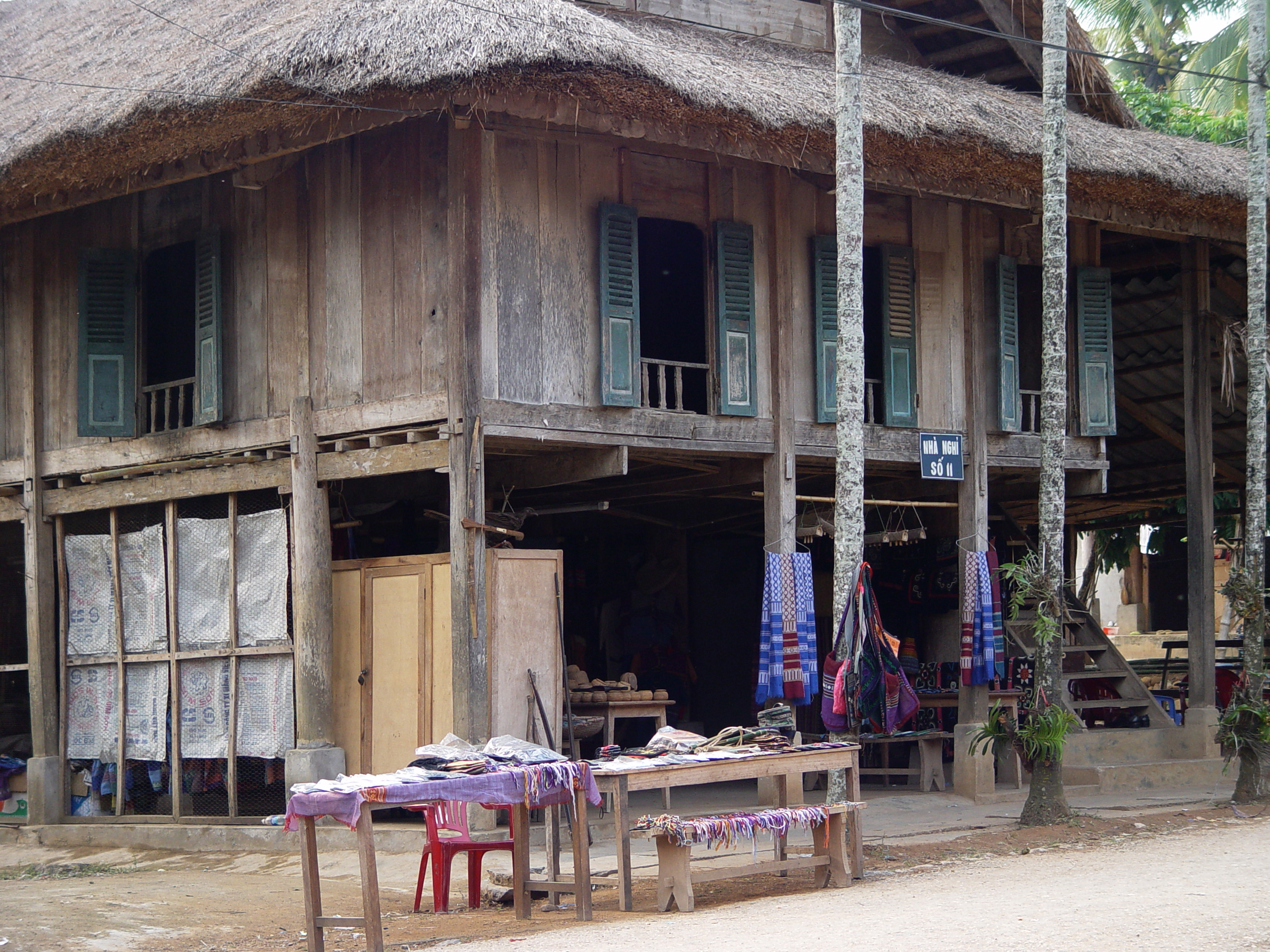
Stilt house construction

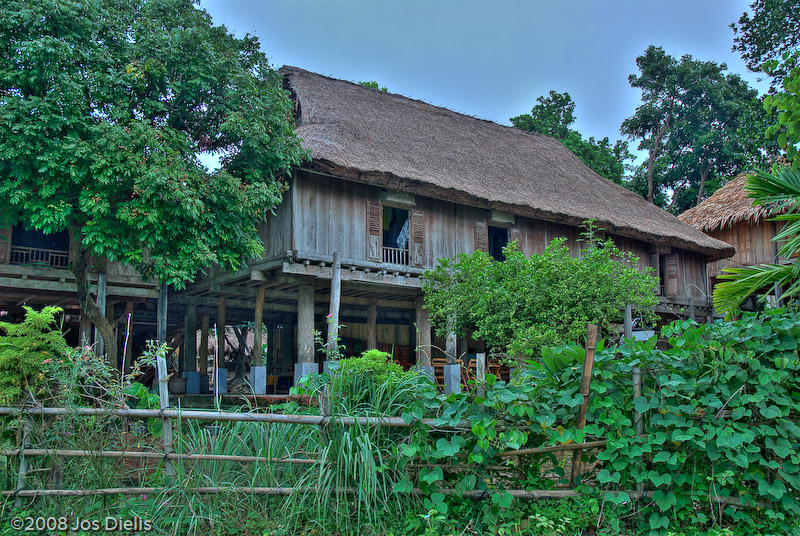
Stilt house

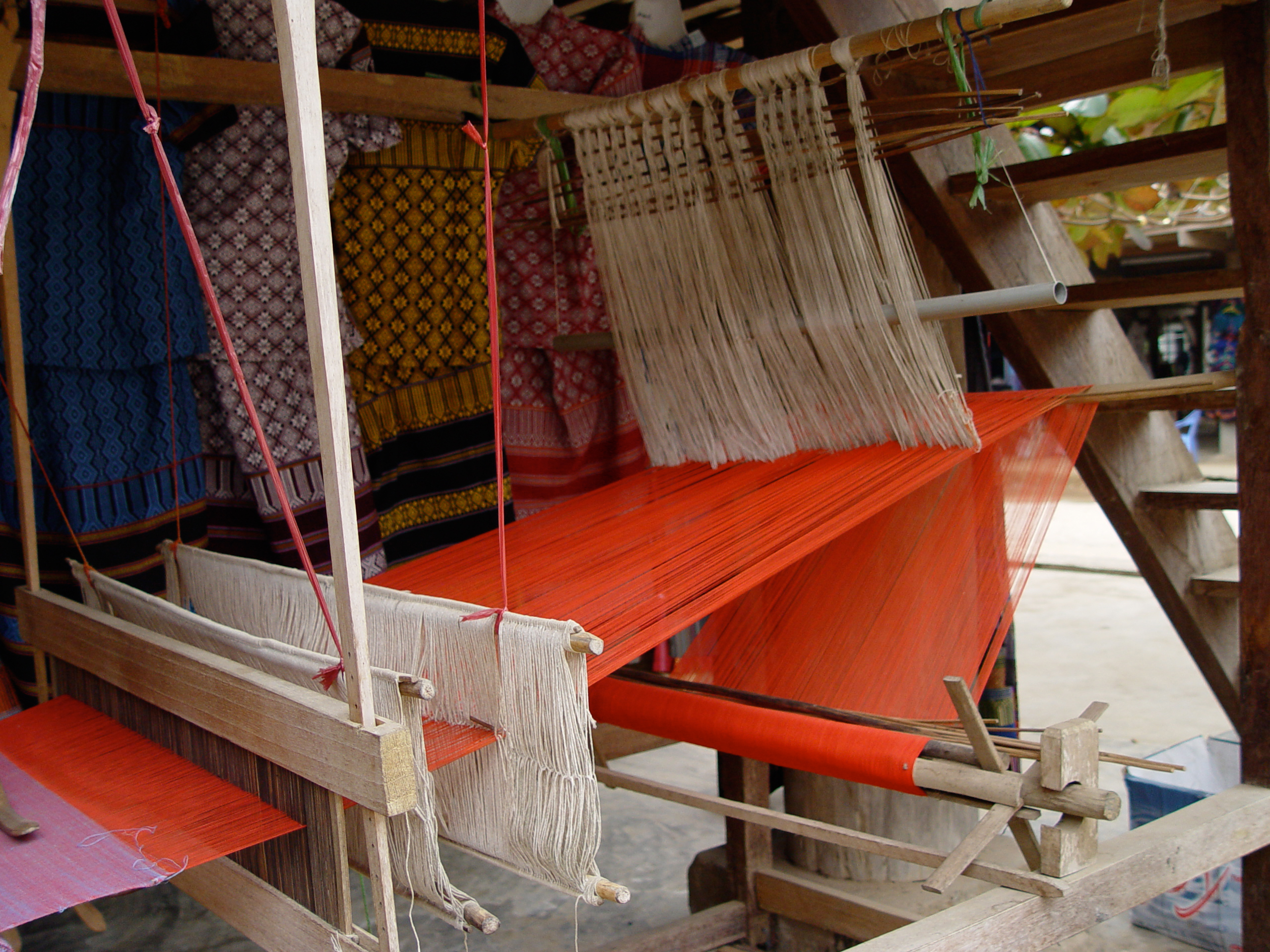
Traditional weaving

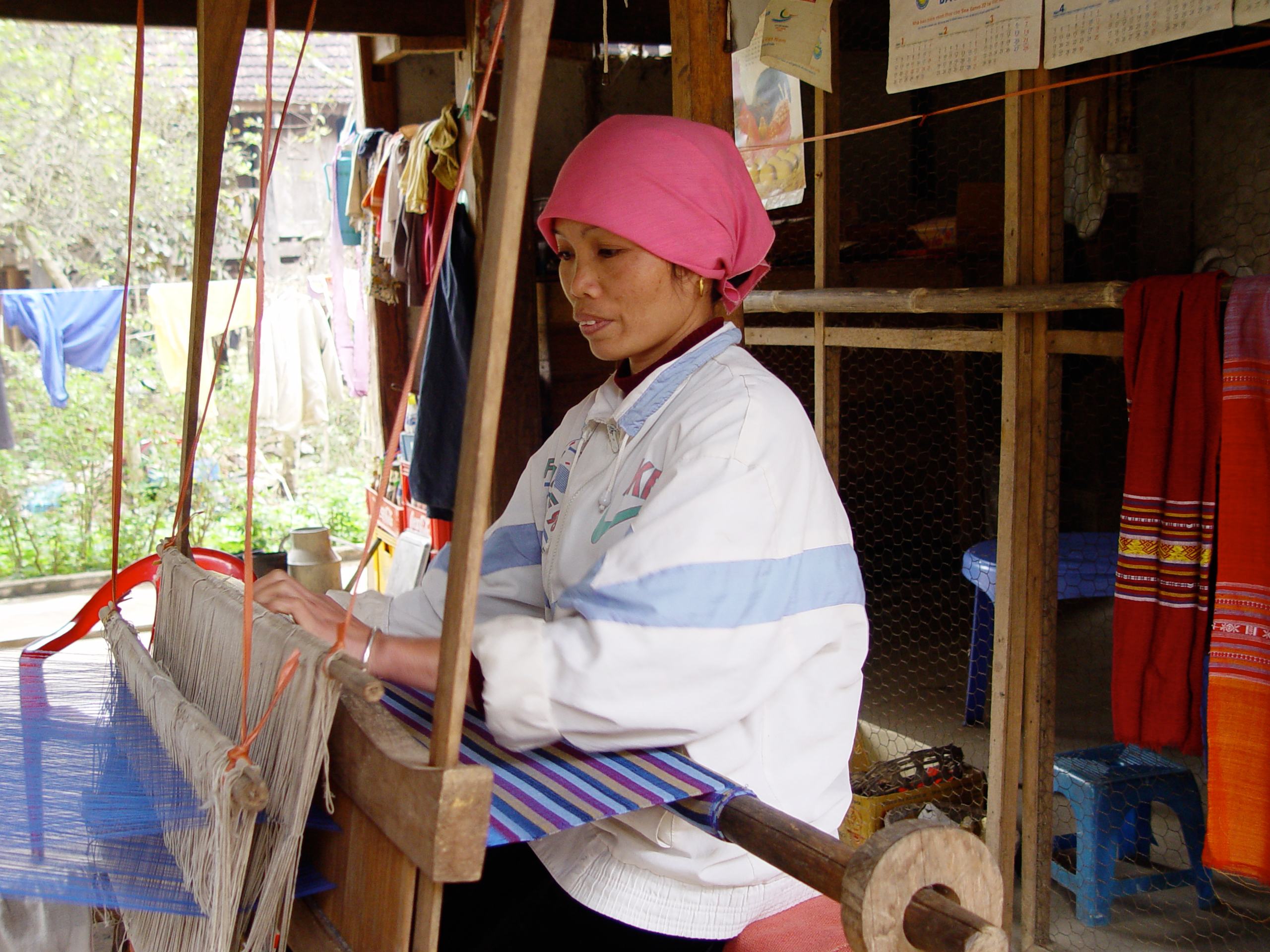
Woman weaving

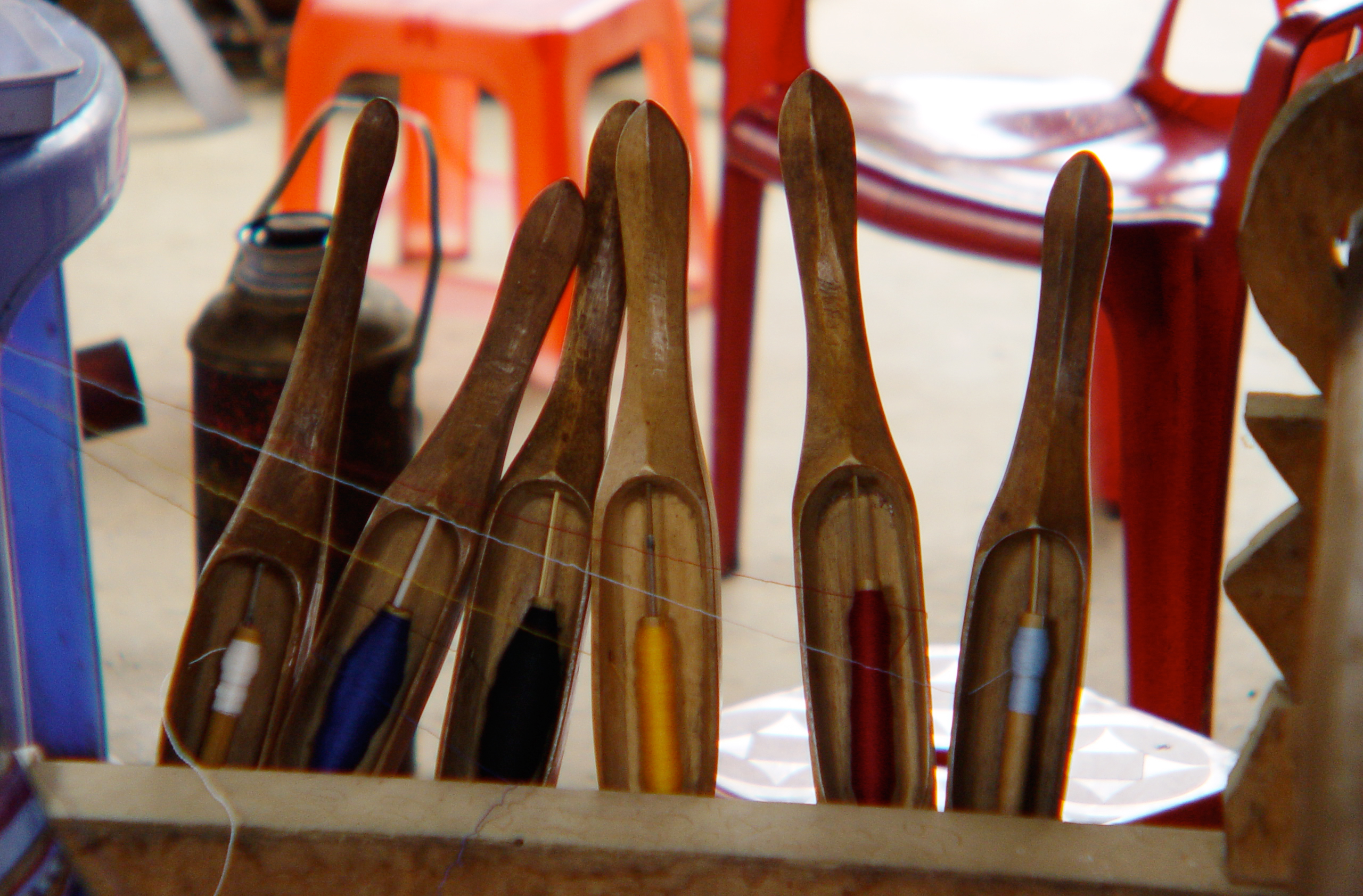
Shuttles used in weaving

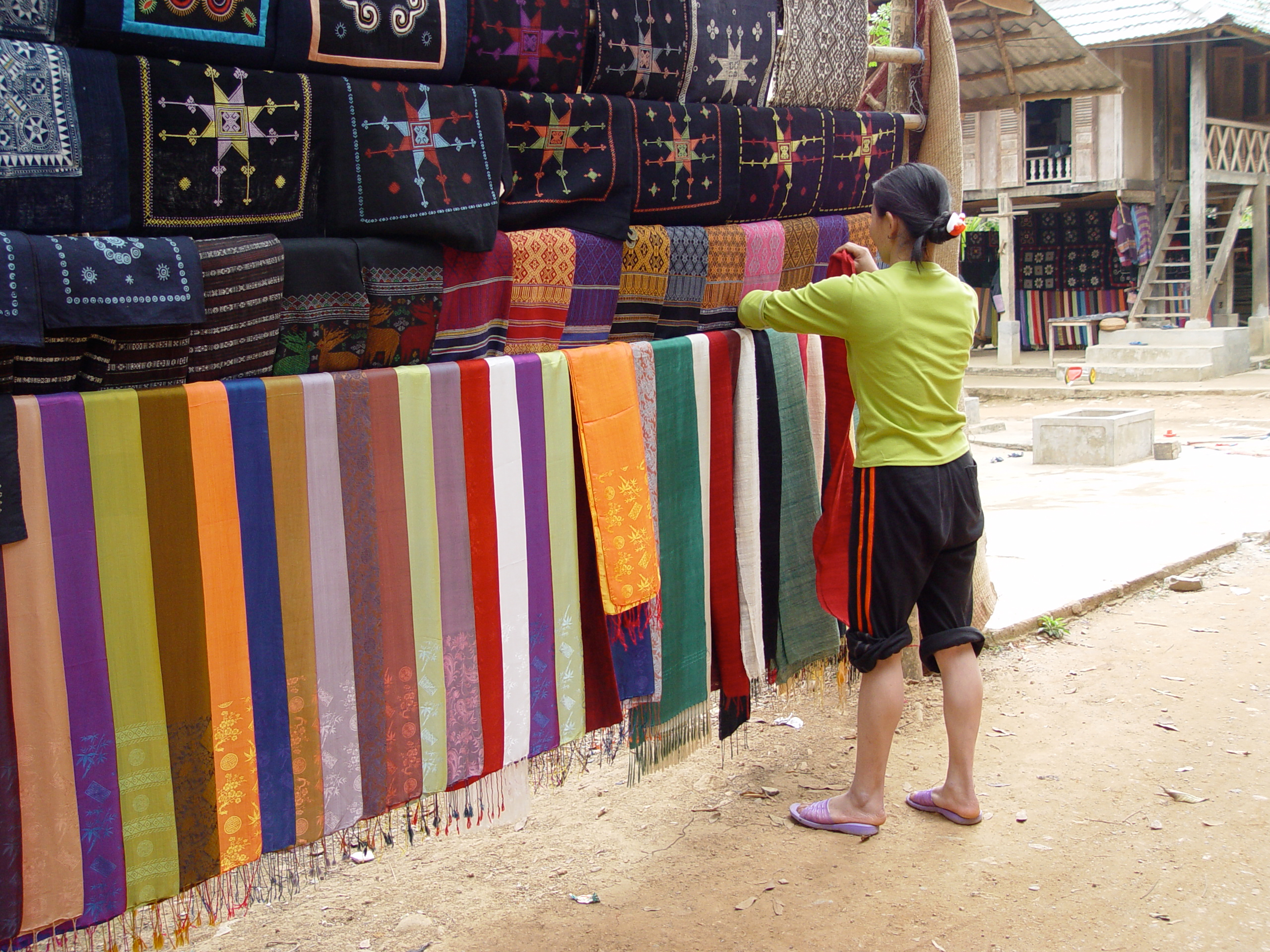
Traditional crafts

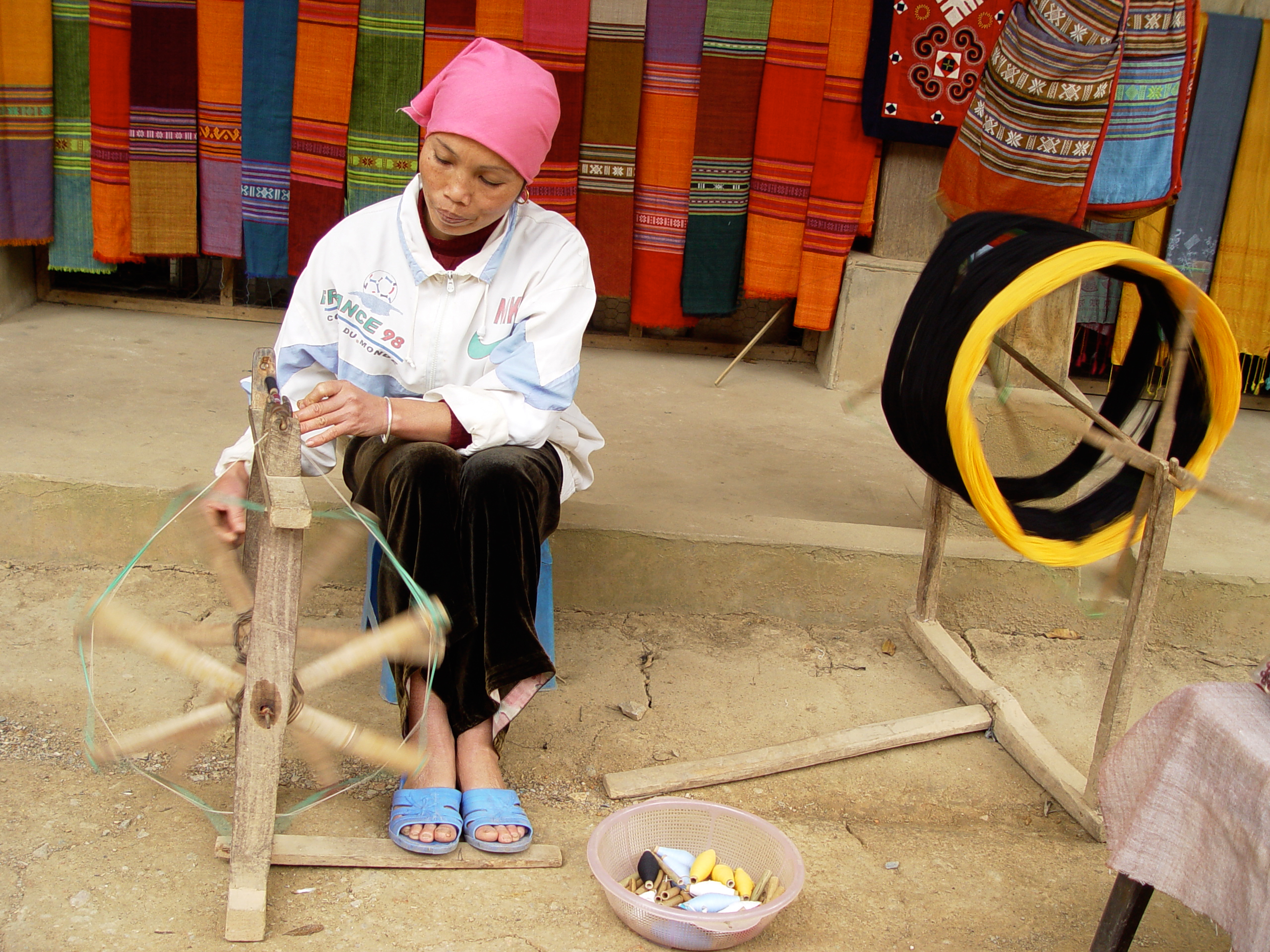
Traditional crafts

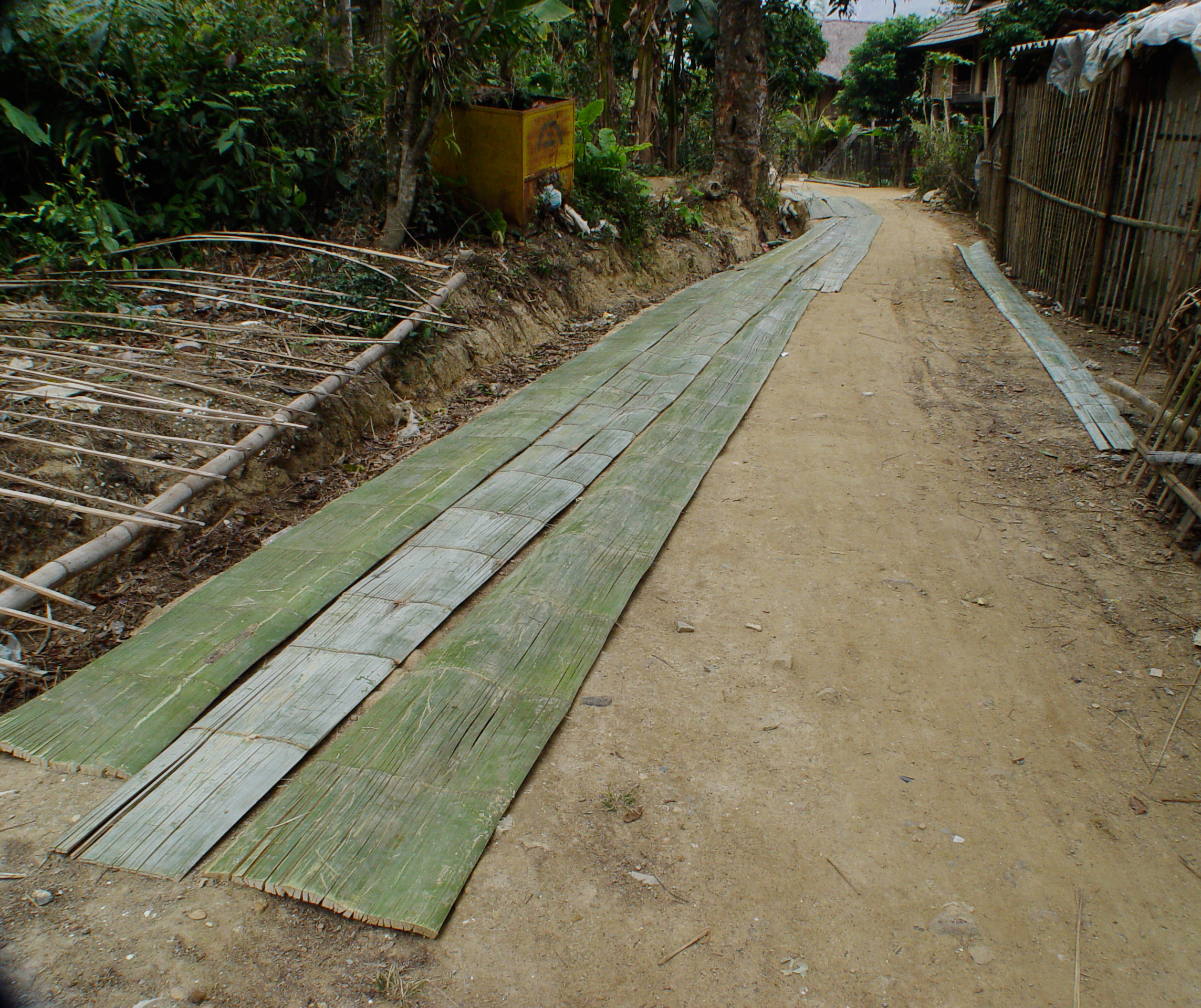
Bamboo drying

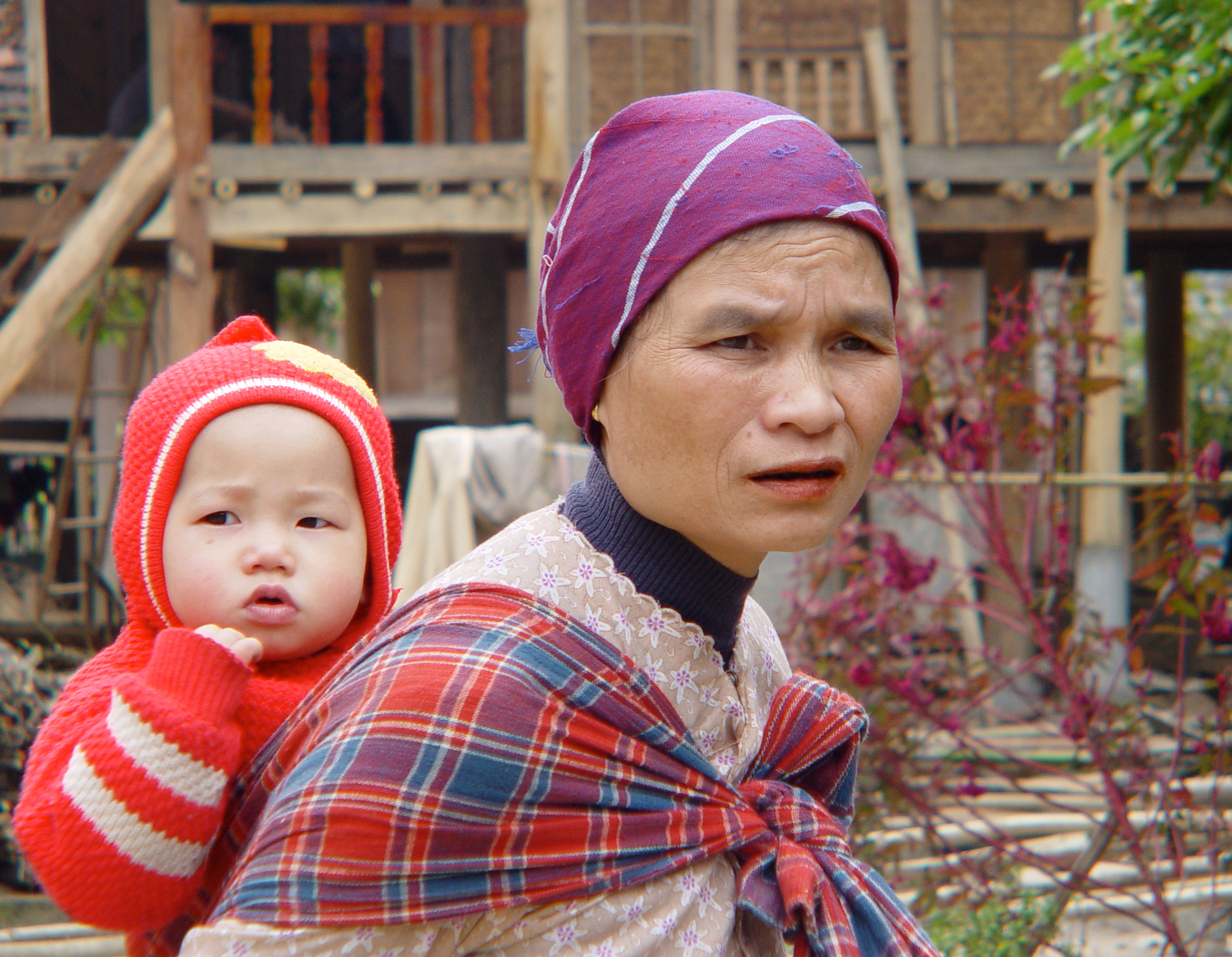
Woman with blackened teeth

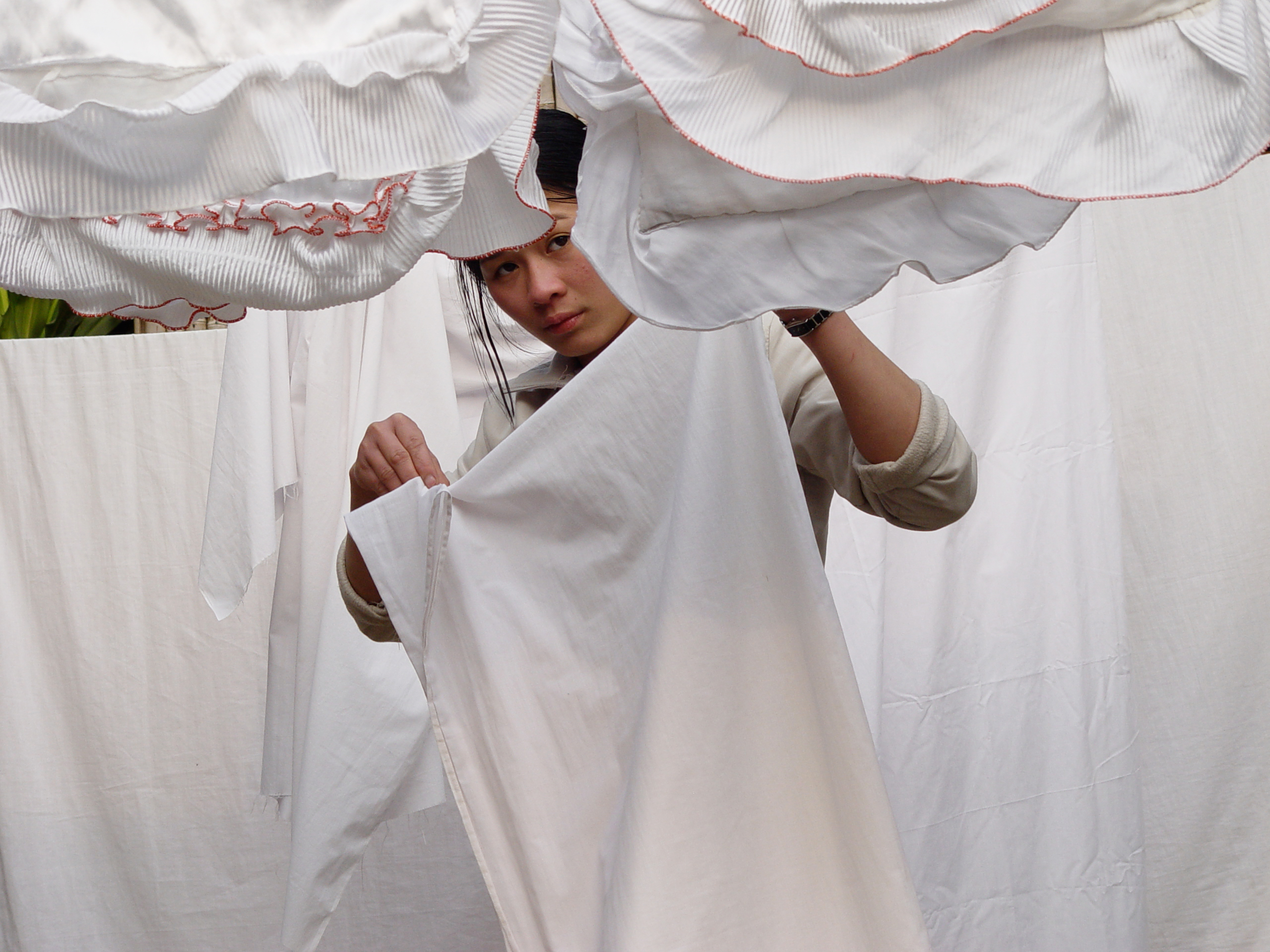
A woman doing the laundry

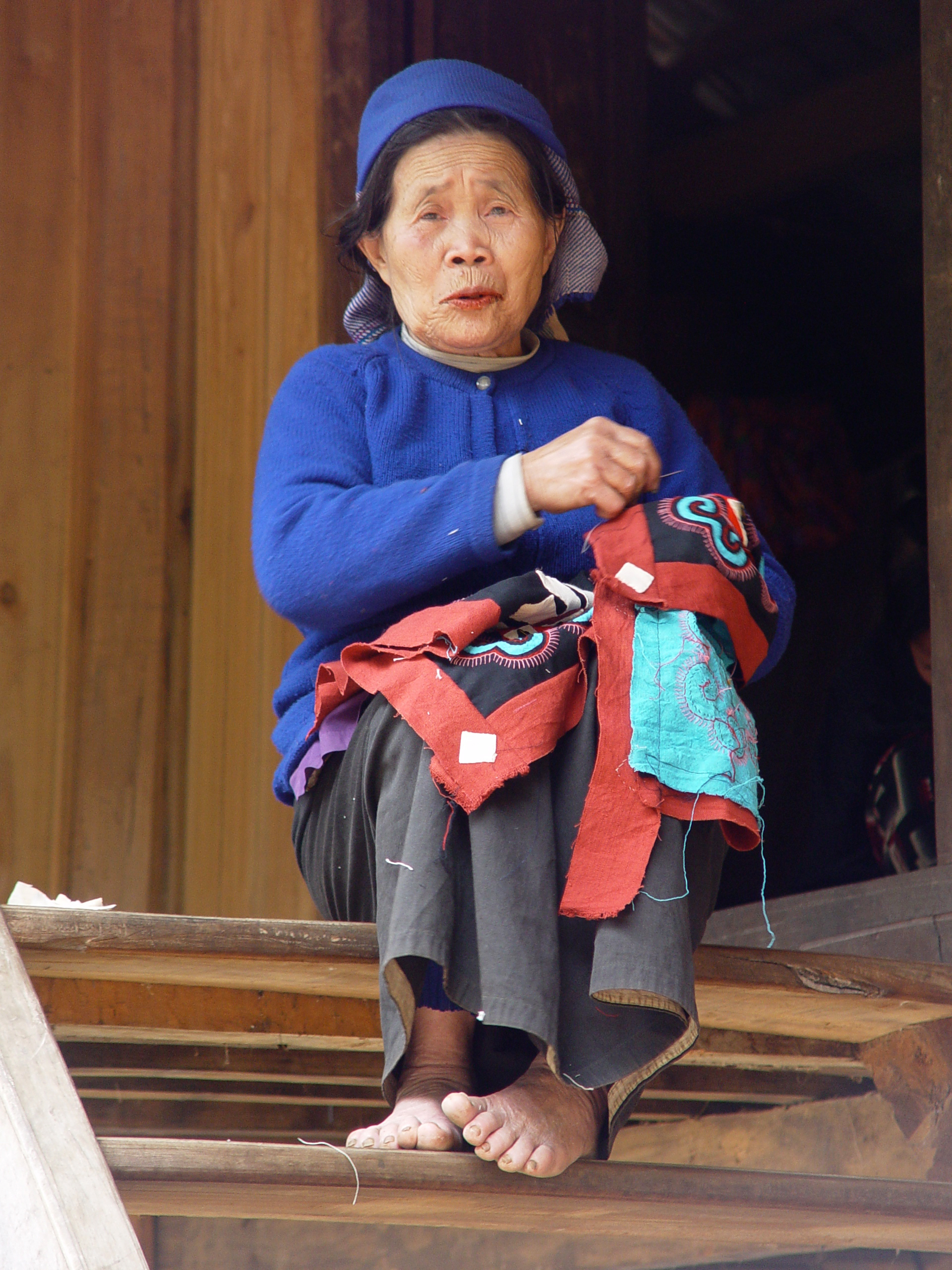
A woman with blackened teeth

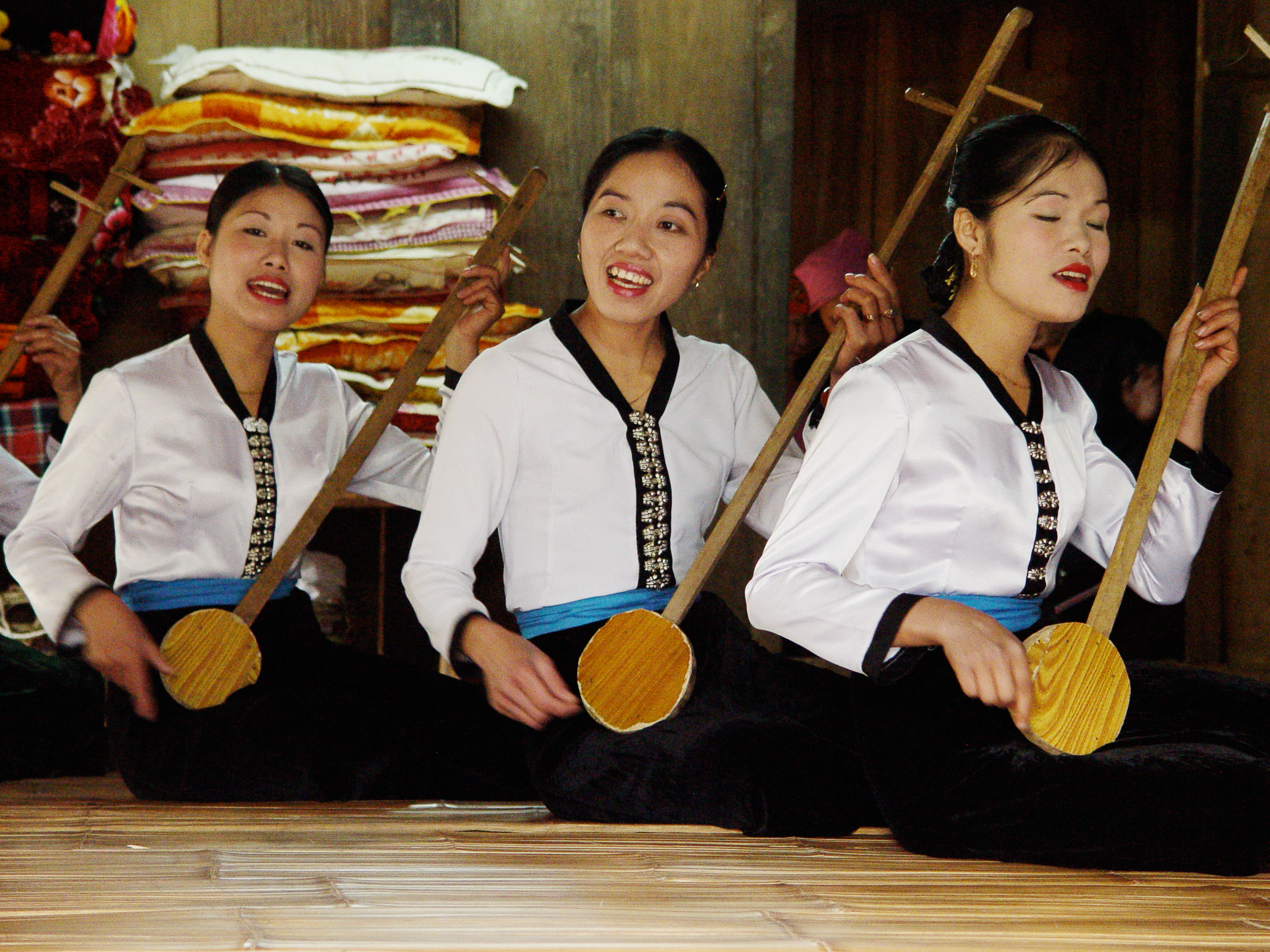
Traditional music

== Economy ==
Mai Châu faced several environmental concerns :

- Deforestation – Land continues to be cleared to produce more crops.
- Trash – Mai Châu faces a garbage disposal problem and this is evident in the diminishing quality of their watercourses.
- Tourism – A gradual influx of tourists puts strain on the local environment.

== See also ==
- Đà Bắc
- Lạc Sơn
- Mộc Châu
