= Mường language =

Austroasiatic language spoken in Vietnam

- Thiểng Mường
- Native to: Vietnam
- Region: Midland and mountainous Northwest of Vietnam
- Ethnicity: Mường
- Native speakers: 1.5 million (2019 census)
- Language family: Austroasiatic: Vietic; Viet–Mường; Mường–Nguồn; Mường language
- Writing system: Latin (modified Chữ Quốc ngữ)

Language codes
- ISO 639-3: mtq
- Glottolog: muon1246

Mường (thiểng Mường; Vietnamese: tiếng Mường) is a group of dialects spoken by the Mường people of Vietnam. They are in the Austroasiatic language family and closely related to Vietnamese. According to Phan (2012), the Mường dialects are not a single language, or even most closely related to each other, but rather are an ethnically defined and paraphyletic taxon.

Mường dialects are primarily spoken in mountainous regions of the northern Vietnamese provinces of Hòa Bình, Thanh Hóa, Phú Thọ, Sơn La, Ninh Bình, Yên Bái, and Đắk Lắk.

Mường has all six tones of Vietnamese; however, the nặng (heavy) tone is present only in Phú Thọ and Thanh Hóa provinces while in Hòa Bình Province, it is merged with the sắc (sharp) tone.

== Writing system ==
Mường had no written form until Western academics in the 20th century developed a provisional alphabet based on a modified Vietnamese alphabet, including the additional consonant w and allowing different consonant pairs and final consonants than Vietnamese.

In September 2016, the People's Committee of Hòa Bình Province adopted resolution 2295/QĐ-UBND, specifying a new Mường alphabet to be used in instruction within the province. The alphabet consists of 28 letters and four tone marks. The provincial Communist Party of Vietnam newspaper, Hòa Bình điện tử (Muong: Wa̒ Bi̒nh diê̠n tứ) began publishing its electronic edition in Mường in addition to Vietnamese and English, surprising some readers with the unusual orthography.

The alphabet is as follows:

A, Ă, Â, B, C, D, Đ, E, Ê, G, H, I, K, L, M, N, O, Ô, Ơ, P, Q, R, T, U, Ư, V, W, X, Y

The letters F, J, S, and Z are used only in loanwords.

== Phonology ==
=== Consonant inventory ===
The following table details the consonants of those dialects that show a full voiced-voiceless distinction in the stops (being Mường Bi, Mường Thành, Mường Động, and Ba Trại). The spelling is given in italics.

		Bilabial	Alveolar	Palatal	Velar	Glottal
Nasal		m /m/	n /n/	nh /ɲ/	ng /ŋ/	
Stop	voiceless	p /p/	t /t/	ch /c/	c /k/	
Stop	aspirated	ph /pʰ/	th /tʰ/		kh /kʰ/	
Stop	voiced	b /b/	đ /d/		g /ɡ ~ ɣ/	
Fricative	voiceless		x /s/			h /h/
Fricative	voiced	v/w/o/u /β/	d/gi/i/y /z ~ j/			
Lateral			l, tl /l, tl ~ kl/			

The Mường Vang dialect completely lacks the distinction between the voiced and unvoiced stop pairs /p b/, /t d/, /k ɡ/, having only the voiceless one of each pair. The Mường Khói and Mường Ống dialects have the full voiceless series, but lack /ɡ/ among the voiced stops. The Thạch Sơn dialect on the other hand lacks /p/.

Furthermore, the Mường Khói dialect lacks the aspirated alveolar /tʰ/, but has a /hr/ instead. This dialect is also described as having the labio-velars /kʷ/ and /kʷʰ/.

All of these consonants can appear syllable-initially. At the end of syllables only the nasals /m n ɲ ŋ/, the voiceless stops /p t c k/, the lateral /l/, and the glides /j w/ occur. Of these phonemes, the palatals /c ɲ/ have been analysed as glide + velar /ʲk ʲŋ/. Furthermore, the distribution of syllable-final /c ɲ l/ seems to be more restricted than the distribution of the other final consonants.

=== Vowel inventory ===
The vowel inventory is given in the following table. It appears to be quite uniform among the different dialects. Two of the vowels (/ɤ/ and /a/) can be long or short.

	Front	Back	
	Front	unrounded	rounded
Close	i /i/	ư /ɯ/	u /u/
Mid	ê /e/	ơ, â /ɤː, ɤ/	ô /o/
Open	e /ɛ/	a, ă /aː, a/	o /ɔ/

Apart from these monophthongs, there are also three diphthongs /iə, ɯə, uə/.

=== Tone ===
All Mường dialects are tonal. The Kim Thương dialect (Phú Thọ province) has been the object of an experimental phonetic study.

== Vocabulary ==
English	Mường	Vietnamese	Proto-Vietic	Other languages	Khmer	Proto-Mon-Khmer	Other languages
zero	không	không		from Middle Chinese 空	sony សូន្យ		from Sanskrit शून्य (śūnya, “zero”)
one	mốch, môch	một	*moːc		muŏy មួយ	*muuj ~ *muəj ~ *muuɲ	
two	hal	hai	*haːr		pir ពីរ	*ɓaar	
three	pa	ba	*pa		bĕi បី	*piʔ	
four	pổn	bốn	*poːnʔ		buŏn បួន	*punʔ	
five	đằm, đăm	năm	*ɗam		pram ប្រាំ	*pɗam	
six	khảu	sáu	*p-ruːʔ		prămmuŏy ប្រាំមួយ		
seven	páy	bảy	*pəs		prămpir ប្រាំពីរ		
eight	thảm	tám	*saːmʔ		prămbĕi ប្រាំបី		
nine	chỉn	chín	*ciːnʔ		prămbuŏn ប្រាំបួន		
ten	mườl	mười	*maːl		dáb ដប់		from Old Chinese 十 (*di̯əp)
hundred	tlăm	trăm	*k-lam		muŏy rôy មួយរយ		from Thai, ร้อย (roi)
water	đác	nước (dialects include nác)	*ɗaːk		tɨk ទឹក	*ɗaːk	
language	thiểng	tiếng		from Old Chinese 聲	phiəsaa ភាសា		from Sanskrit भाषा (bhāṣā)
river	không	sông	*k-roːŋ		tŭənlei ទន្លេ (kŭənlɔɔng គន្លង)	*d(n)liʔ	
sky	tlời	trời (Middle Vietnamese: blời)	*b-ləːj		meik មេឃ		From Sanskrit मेघ (megha, “cloud”)
moon	tlăng	trăng (Middle Vietnamese: blăng)	*b-laŋ		look khae លោកខែ		From Sanskrit लोक (loka, “world”) and Proto-Mon-Khmer *khəjʔ (“moon; month”)
bird	chim	chim	*-ciːm		baksəy បក្សី		From Sanskrit पक्षि (pakṣi)
forest	rầng	rừng	*k-rəŋ		prɨy ព្រៃ	*briiʔ	

- Note two different romanisations are used to show Khmer here. (UNGEGN and Wiktionary Transcription)

=== Comparison of Mường and Vietnamese sentences ===
Mường	Vietnamese
Cải tlỗng chăng bong, lòng chăng yểng.	Cái bụng không vâng, lòng không theo.
Nả tang chái tlốc.	Nó đang chải đầu.
Tlước ăn chay khau ăn nhúc.	Trước ăn chay sau ăn thịt.
Ho là thôn mễ Tử.	Tôi là cháu bà Tự.

- "Cải tlỗng chăng bong, lòng chăng yểng." - Mường uses chăng for 'no', it is cognate with Vietnamese chăng and chẳng (extant and widely understood as a negation word in Vietnamese, but rarely used except in poetic contexts).
- "Nả tang chái tlốc." - Mường uses tlốc for 'head', it is cognate with Vietnamese trốc, it was formerly the primary word for head, but has been displaced with đầu (頭).
- "Tlước ăn chay khau ăn nhúc." - Mường uses nhúc (肉) for 'meat', Vietnamese uses a native word for 'meat', thịt. It is cognate with Mường thit 'uncommon word for meat'.
- "Ho là thôn mễ Tử." - Mường uses thôn (孫) for 'grandchild', Vietnamese uses a native word for 'grandchild', cháu. It is cognate with Mường chảu 'son-in-law'.
