= Tân Lạc district =

Tân Lạc District Huyện Tân Lạc
- District
- Seal
- Interactive map of Tân Lạc District
- Coordinates: 20.667°N 105.250°E
- Country: Vietnam
- Region: Northwest
- Province: Hòa Bình
- Capital: Mãn Đức
- Subdivision: 1 township and 15 rural communes

Government
  - Type: District

Area
  - Total: 523 km^{2} (202 sq mi)

Population (2019)
  - Total: 86,889
  - Density: 166/km^{2} (430/sq mi)
- Time zone: UTC+7 (Indochina Time)

Tân Lạc is a former rural district of Hòa Bình province in the Northwest region of Vietnam. As of 2019, the district had a population of 86,889. The district covers an area of 523 km^{2} (202 sq mi). The district capital lies at Mãn Đức.

== Administrative divisions ==
Tân Lạc is divided into 16 commune-level sub-divisions, including the township of Lương Sơn and 10 rural communes (Đông Lai, Gia Mô, Lỗ Sơn, Mỹ Hòa, Ngổ Luông, Ngọc Mỹ, Nhân Mỹ, Phong Phú, Phú Cường, Phú Vinh, Quyết Chiến, Suối Hoa, Thanh Hối, Tử Nê, Vân Sơn).
