= Dó paper =

Vietnamese paper

Giấy dó
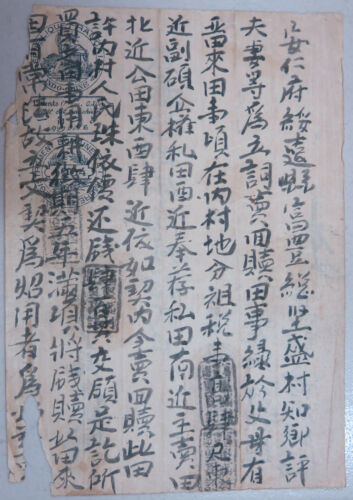
- Type: Handmade paper
- Material: Rhamnoneuron bark
- Place of origin: Northern Vietnam
- Introduced: 3rd/13th century
- Manufacturer: Kinh; Mường; Nùng

Dó paper (Vietnamese: giấy dó) or poonah paper is a handmade paper indigenous to Northern Vietnam cultures, made from the inner bark of the dó or poonah tree (Rhamnoneuron balansae). It is a preferred support in some traditions of Vietnamese art.

== History ==
Sources stake the first creation of dó paper as either the 3rd century or 13th century, after papermaking techniques were introduced from China. The origin of the paper was the village of Dương Ổ in Phong Khê ward, Bắc Ninh, where local materials were adapted for papermaking.

In the 18th and 19th centuries, Dương Ổ and Yen Thai guild (modern Bưởi, Hanoi) were centers of the burgeoning dó paper industry. Following the late 20th century Đổi Mới reforms, dó paper production dropped significantly with the introduction of mass-produced pulpwood paper. Many traditional producers pivoted to paper recycling.

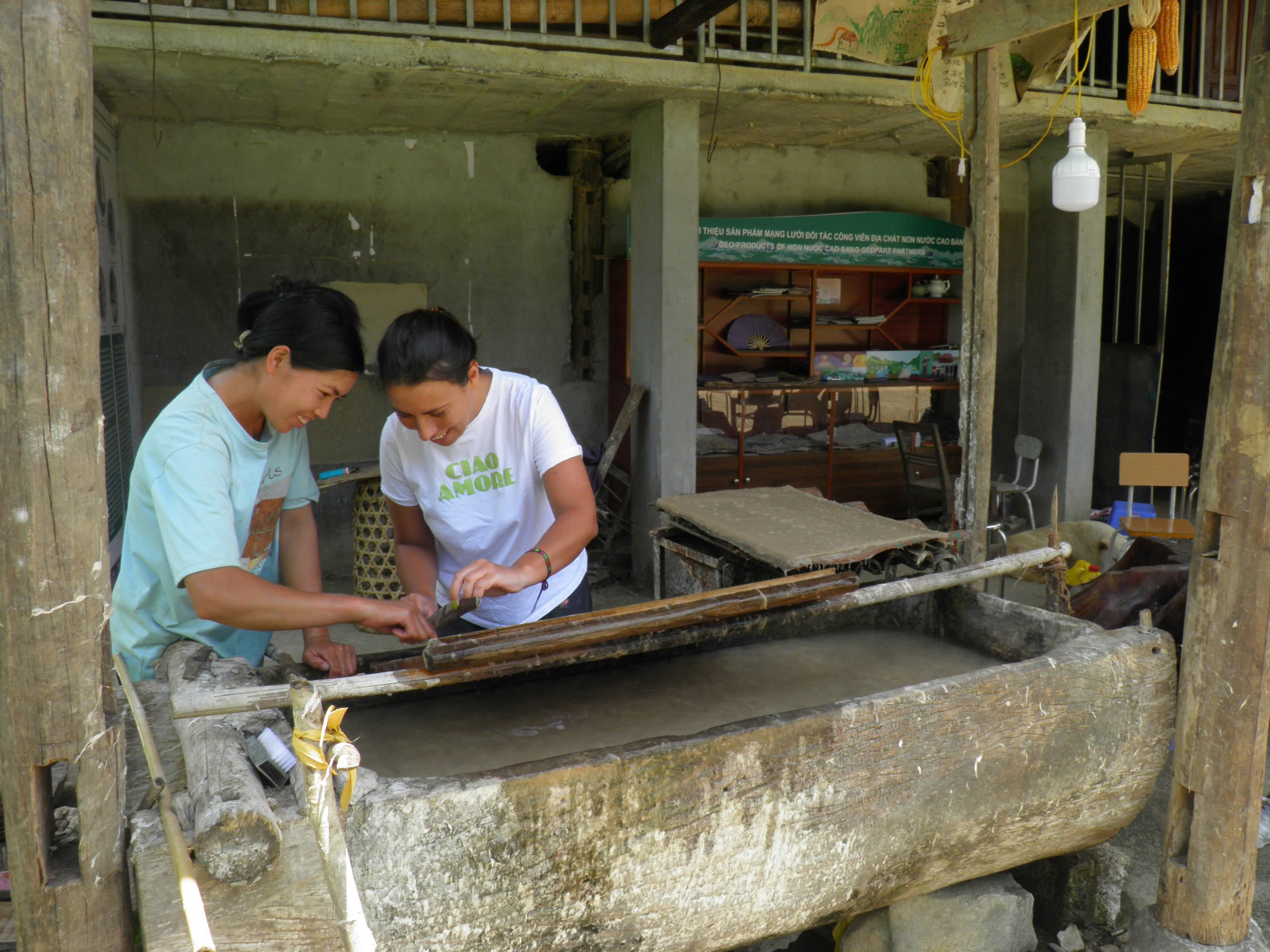
Slurry basin with screen in Dia Tren, Quảng Uyên

== Production and use ==
To create dó paper, first Rhamnoneuron bark is soaked in limewater for 24 hours up to three months. The bark is then boiled for ten hours, rinsed to wash away the alkali, and then scraped to remove the outer bark from the bast fiber. After this, the retained inner bark is washed again and then beaten into pulp, using either mallets or a mechanical beater. The pulp is then dispersed in a vat filled with fresh water and mixed with a mucilaginous formation aid called mò extracted from wood shavings of a tropical laurel (Litsea glutinosa). Once the pulp and formation aid are uniformly dispersed in the vat, a bamboo screen (liềm xeo) is dipped in the vat to form paper sheets. The wet sheets are then couched in a post, pressed, and air-dried on porous concrete walls. Artisans claim that production takes from 30 to upwards of 100 discrete steps to complete, and that the paper can last upwards of 800 years; exact production details are often trade secrets.

Dó paper features in various Vietnamese art traditions. Vietnamese calligraphy makes use of the paper, as does folk painting such as the Đông Hồ, Hàng Trống and Kim Hoàng painting traditions.

=== Ethnic minorities ===
Multiple ethnic minorities in Vietnam produce and use dó paper as a part of ethnic traditions: the Mường people of Cao Sơn ward, Tủa Chùa district, and Điện Biên province; and the Nùng An of Dia Tren village, Quảng Uyên. Dó paper is used for votive offerings and decorations for Tết Nguyên Đán (transl. the Lunar New Year festival).

In Mường tradition, dó paper is used to create xử ca, paper craft ornaments of cut dó paper and chicken feathers to adorn altars.

== Specialty varieties ==
=== Giấy điệp ===
Produced for Đông Hồ painting in the eponymous Đông Hồ village, giấy điệp (lit. 'scallop paper') is dó paper treated with powdered nacre for a sparkling, iridescent effect. The effect is achieved with brushes made of pine needles.

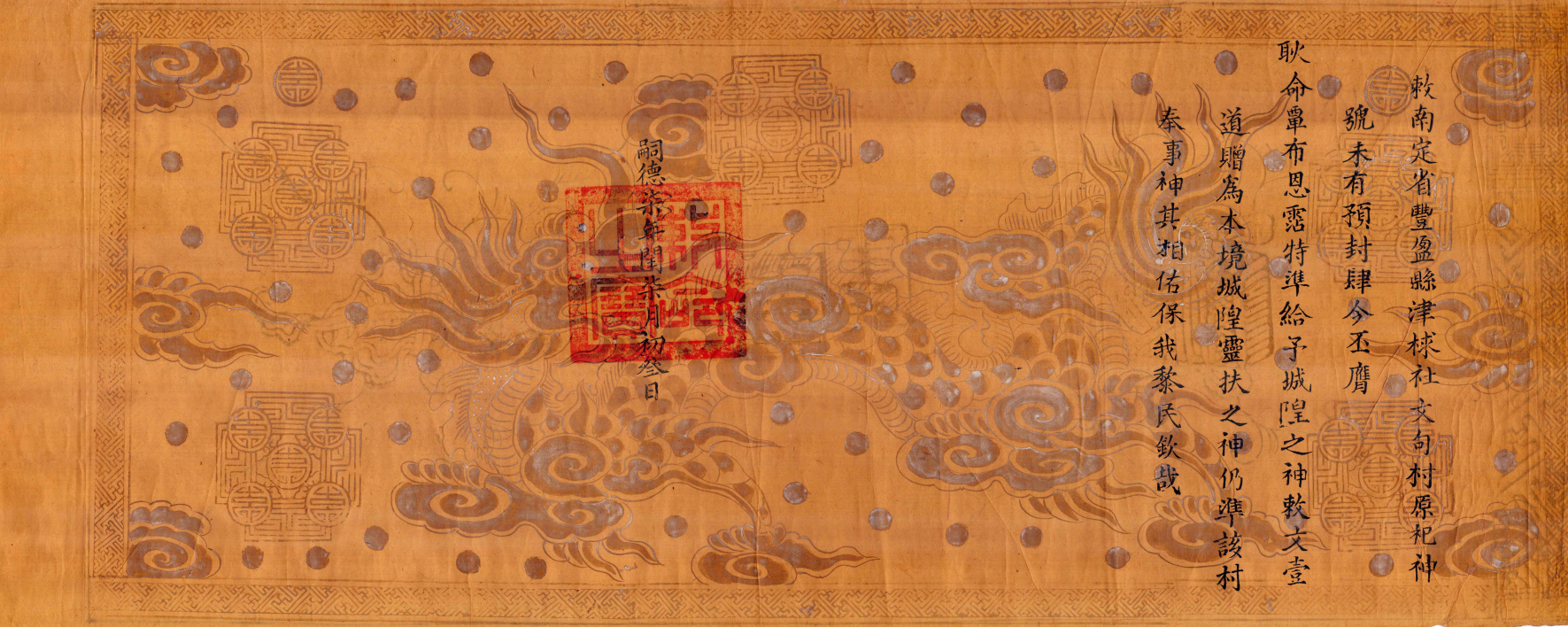
Sắc phong from the reign of Tự Đức of Đại Nam (1847–1883)

=== Sách văn ===
Sách văn is a luxury variety of dó paper originally used by the monarchs of Vietnam for royal edicts, or sắc phong. Production of sách văn began in Trung Nha village, Nghĩa Đô, Hanoi in the 15th century by order of the Le dynasty of Đại Việt. The paper is dyed with hoa hoe (Sophora japonica) extract to be golden-orange. The paper is pounded (nghe) to be exceptionally smooth and supple. Exact details of the production process are still guarded as a trade secret by modern ancestors of the village.

== Craft revival ==
In the 1980s, interest in dó paper grew as a contemporary painting support for gouache, watercolor painting and natural dye paints.

== See also ==
- Mulberry paper
- Saa paper
- Khoi paper
