= Thuận Thành (town) =

Coordinates: 21.050°N 106.083°E

Thuận Thành Town Thị xã Thuận Thành Siêu Loại huyện Phố Mới
- District-level town (Class-IV)
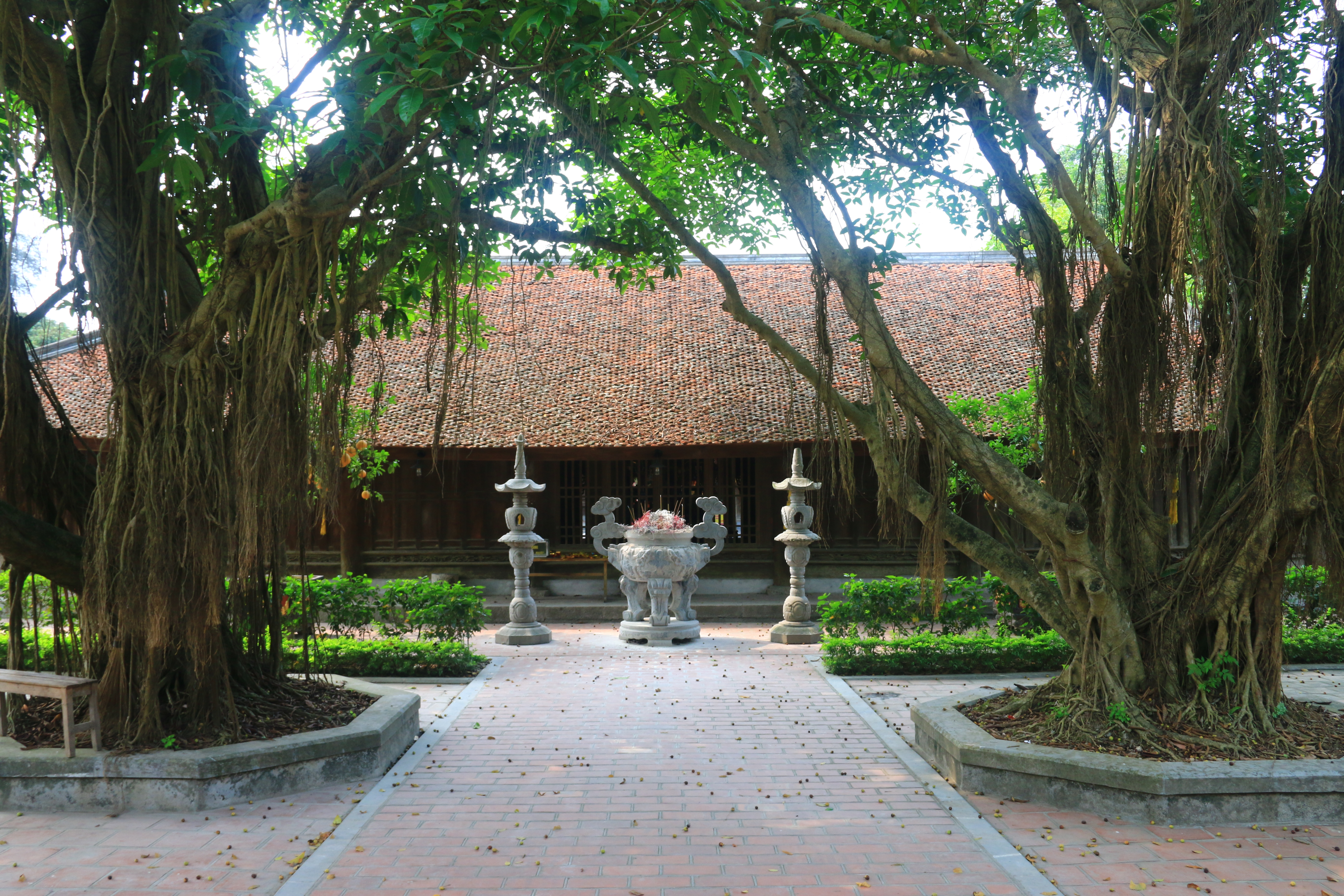
- Main hall of Ninh Phúc Pagoda in April 24, 2023.
- Nickname(s): "Pagodaland" (Đất Phật Ngàn Chùa)
- Interactive map of Thuận Thành Town; Thị xã Thuận Thành
- Country: Vietnam
- Region: Red River Delta
- Province: Bắc Ninh
- Establishment: 187 AD
- Central hall: No.332, Mới street, Hồ ward, Thuận Thành town

Government
  - Type: Municipality
  - People Committee's Chairman: Văn Quốc Cường
  - People Council's Chairman: Nguyễn Văn Thược
  - Front Committee's Chairman: Trần Xuân Nhiên
  - Party Committee's Secretary: Nguyễn Mạnh Hùng

Area
  - Total: 117.83 km^{2} (45.49 sq mi)

Population (December 31, 2022)
  - Total: 199,577
  - Density: 1,694/km^{2} (4,390/sq mi)
  - Ethnicities: Kinh; Tanka
- Time zone: UTC+7 (Indochina Time)
- ZIP code: 220000–550000 (Note: An official code from April 23, 2022, to present.)
- Website: Thuanthanh.Bacninh.gov.vn; Thuanthanh.Bacninh.dcs.vn

Thuận Thành [tʰwə̰ʔn˨˩:tʰa̤jŋ˨˩] is a former town of Bắc Ninh province in the Red River Delta of Vietnam.

== Geography ==
Currently, Thuận Thành town includes 18 commune-level sub-divisions.

- 10 wards : Hồ, An Bình, Gia Đông, Hà Mãn, Ninh Xá, Song Hồ, Thanh Khương, Trạm Lộ, Trí Quả, Xuân Lâm.
- 8 communes : Đại Đồng Thành, Đình Tổ, Hoài Thượng, Mão Điền, Nghĩa Đạo, Ngũ Thái, Nguyệt Đức, Song Liễu.

=== Topography ===
The town covers an area of 117.83 km².

=== Demography ===
As of 2022 the town had a population of 199,577.

== Culture ==
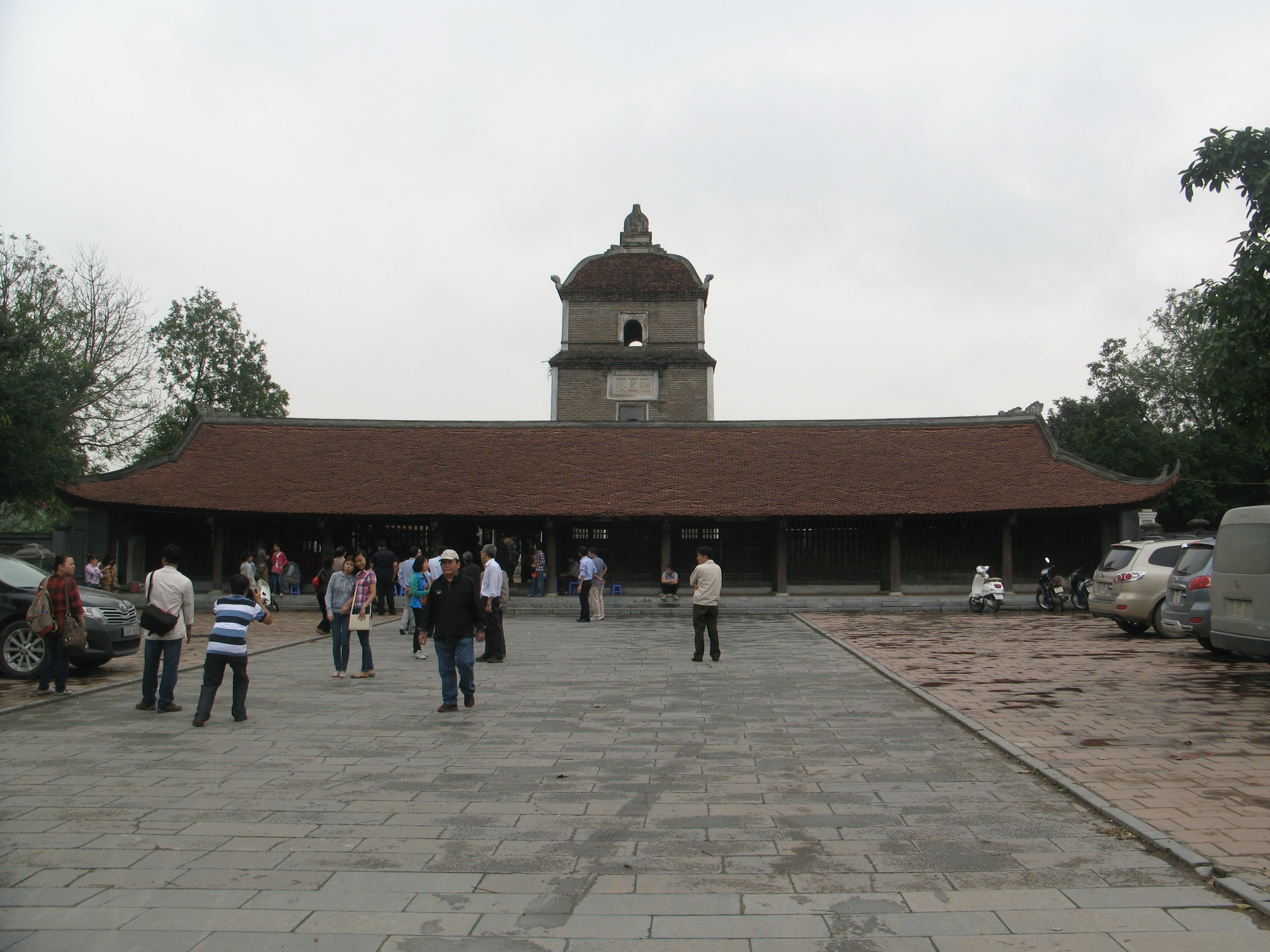
View of the Diên Ứng Pagoda.

- Đông Hồ painting is a genre of Vietnamese woodcut paintings originating from Đông Hồ village (làng Đông Hồ).
- Luy Lâu was the ancient capital of Annam after it became a Han Dynasty Chinese province called Jiaozhou, or Jiaozhi under the Chinese Commander-in-chief Sĩ Tiếp.
- Diên Ứng Pagoda was built between AD 187 and 226. The pagoda is in the area of the remains of the ancient citadel and Buddhist center of Luy Lâu.
- Ninh Phúc Pagoda is one of the most famous pagodas in Vietnam. Inside, there are various valuable ancient objects and statues, which are considered to be Annamese masterpieces of 17th century wood carving.
- Thuận Thành No 1 High School is one of the top-ranked high schools in Bắc Ninh Province and which was in Vietnam's Top 100 High Schools for many years.

=== Notable persons ===
- Hoàng Cầm
- Nguyễn Gia Thiều

=== Landscapes ===
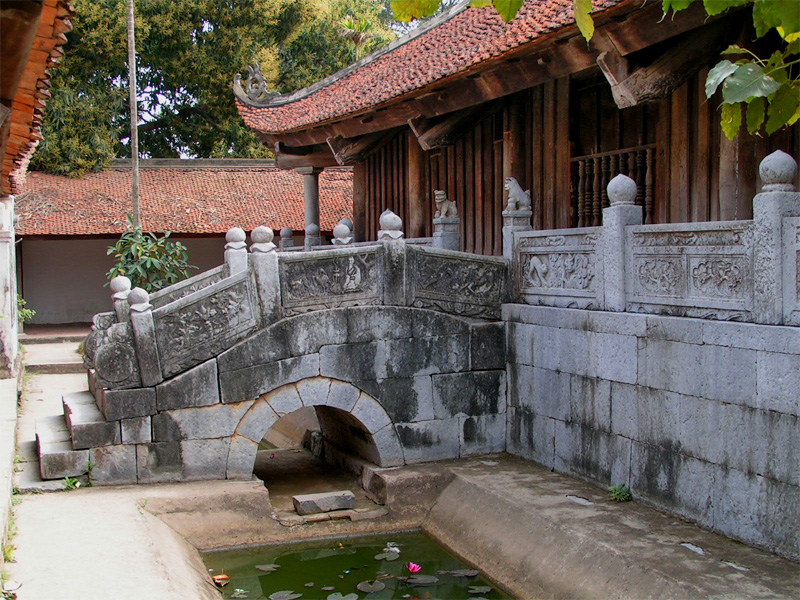
Ninh Phúc Pagoda

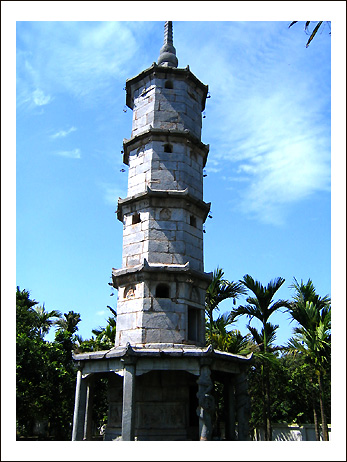
Bảo Nghiêm tower in Ninh Phúc Pagoda

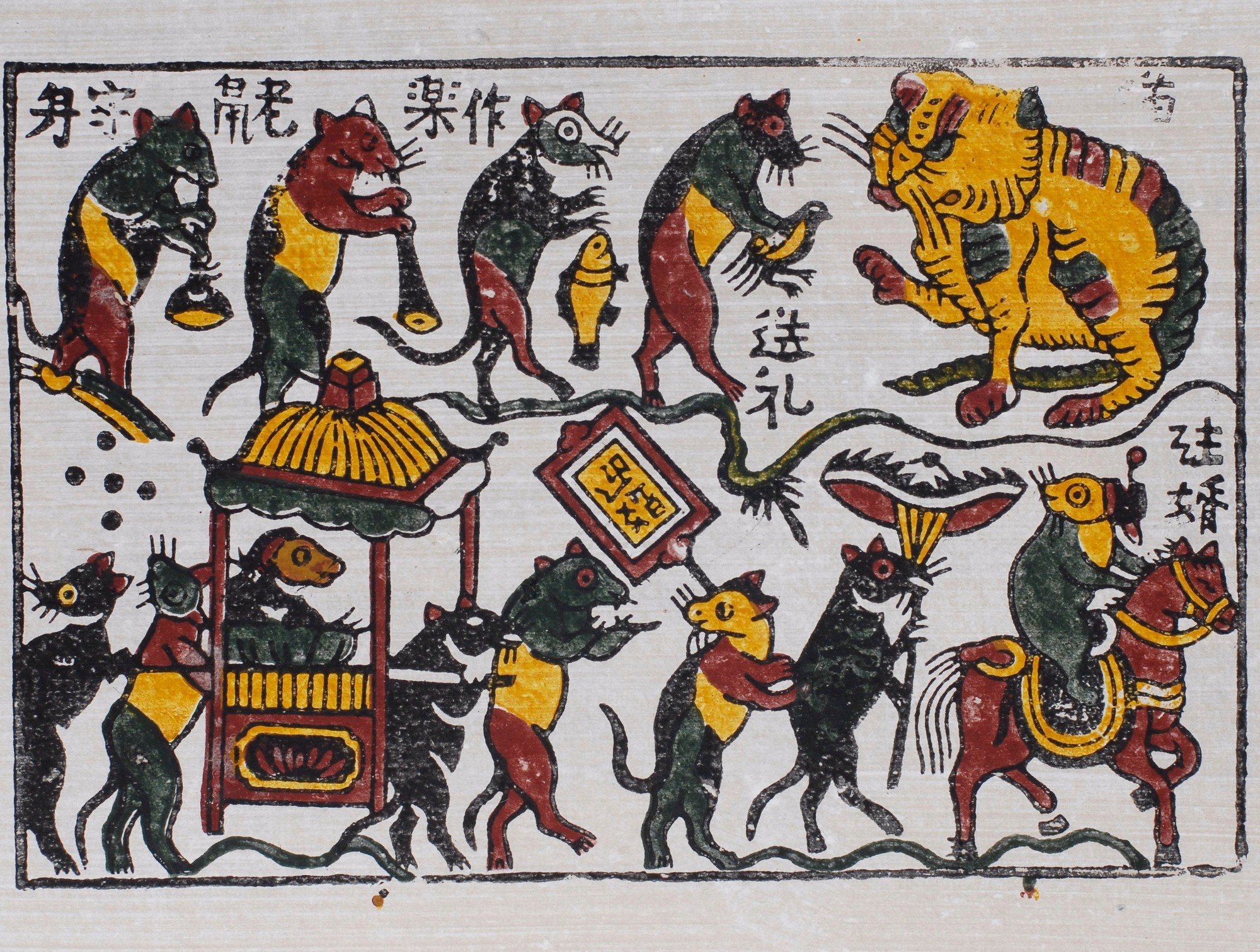
The Rats Taking a Bride (Lão thử thú thân) of Đông Hồ painting

== See also ==
- Tiên Du
- Từ Sơn
