= Lê Hiền Minh =

Vietnamese artist

- Born: 1979 (age 46–47); Hanoi, North Vietnam
- Known for: Sculpture, Installation art

Lê Hiền Minh (born 1979) is a Vietnamese artist known for employing a Vietnamese traditional handmade paper called Dó to construct large-scale installations. Growing up in war-torn Vietnam during the political and economic shifts of the 1980s and 1990s has had a lasting impact on Minh's artistic vision. Drawing on these formative experiences, her work explores the relationship between reality and possibility, with a focus on the female experience as a central subject. Her practice incorporates socio-historical and cultural narratives, drawing on mystical, spiritual, metaphysical, and surrealist elements. Through this approach, her work addresses the interplay between tangible and intangible forces, as well as the visible and invisible systems that influence contemporary life.

She has participated in numerous solo and group exhibitions in Vietnam and abroad, including Vietnam National Museum of Fine Arts in Hanoi, Vietnam, Ho Chi Minh Museum of Fine Arts in Ho Chi Minh city, Vietnam, Fukuoka Asian Art Museum in Fukuoka, Japan, Incheon Women Artist Biennale in Incheon, South Korea, Spinnerei in Leipzig, Germany, Sculpture Expanded by the Association of Finnish Sculptors in Helsinki, Finland, Wedeman Gallery in Massachusetts, USA. She has also lectured at multiple public institutions, including San Jose Museum of Art in San Jose, USA and Fukuoka Asian Art Museum in Fukuoka, Japan.

== Early life and education ==
Lê Hiền Minh was born in Hanoi, North Vietnam in 1979. In 1998, she studied traditional lacquer at Ho Chi Minh City University of Fine Arts. Upon graduating, she moved to America to attend the Art Academy of Cincinnati and graduated with a Bachelor of Fine Arts in 2004. In 2022, Minh received a Graduate Scholarship from the Asian Cultural Council and a University Fellowship from the Graduate College at the University of Illinois Chicago. She moved to Chicago from Vietnam the same year, and in 2024, she earned a Master of Fine Arts degree from the College of Architecture, Design, and the Arts at the University of Illinois Chicago.

== Art ==
Lê Hiền Minh has been using Vietnamese traditional handmade paper called Dó as her primary art-making material for two decades. Dó paper is made from the bark of the Dó tree and is used to make woodcut folk prints called Đông Hồ. This type of folk print has existed since the 11th century during the reign of the Lý Dynasty. She uses this paper to create large-scale sculptural installations, a departure from the traditional use of Dó paper in Vietnamese art. Minh describes her intention "As the Dó paper tradition becomes a relic, I am exploring ways to reinvent it as a contemporary art making material. It is my hope that the use of Dó paper in my artwork will contribute to cultural sustainability."

In various interviews, Minh has divided her career in two periods: in the early period, her work drew from her inner life and focused on personal history, while in the later period, her work focuses on socially engaged projects that explore politics, spiritual iconography, and history, drawing on sources such as archaeology, mythology, and religion. She has stated that her early art education at Ho Chi Minh City University of Fine Arts in the late 1990s was influenced by the principles of Socialist Realism, which emphasized collective values. Her subsequent studies in the United States introduced her to an educational model focused on individual self-expression. The interplay between these two pedagogical influences continues to inform her artistic practice.

=== Notable artworks ===
==== Dictionaries (2012) ====
This installation was first exhibited at Vietnam National Museum of Fine Arts. Dictionaries consists of 1000 sculptural objects in the form of a dictionary, a commemorative work created specifically for 10 year anniversary of Minh's father's death. Together with the installation, Minh created an artist book, Còn Lại|Rời Rạc, as a companion piece to the installation. "18 loose cards housed in a blue box, each featuring a photograph of objects that belonged to the artist's father with handwritten memories on the reverse. Includes an artist statement printed on brown paper and one loose photograph." "The exhibition is attracting many visitors. Among them, visitor Vu Thuy Trang said "Thanks to Roi Rac, memories about the past and childhood of the person in the artist’s generation become fulfilled through the experiences of others". The installation was later shown in Ho Chi Minh Museum of Fine Arts.

==== The Production of Man (2016, also known as Balls revisited) ====
"Female identity and labour, and gender inequality issues – these concepts have grounded, interwoven, and driven the artistic practice of Lê Hiền Minh since the beginning of her career." The installation The Production of Man consists of a black lacquer altar table that Vietnamese use to put an incense holder to house the souls of the ancestors, a large glass jar used to infuse Rược thuốc that Vietnamese men believed to be good for their sexual health, overfilled with more than 20 thousand hand-sculpted paper balls onto the floor. "Accompanied by a Confucianist phrase that translates to something like: 'A woman’s greatest duty is to produce a son,' the burgeoning balls exert a persistent pressure of male power." Minh uses these cultural historical objects and text to ask "What does it mean to be female? What does it mean to be a ‘modern woman’ in Vietnamese society?" are contemporarily relevant. The work criticizes traditional gender roles as they relate to power structures and social hierarchies in Vietnam's culture "in which certain traditional values may serve one gender at the expense of the other". "This sweeping and provocative inscription in The Production of Man received a variety of responses from viewers" also marked that "text plays an essential role in Lê Hiền Minh's works".

==== Five Questions (2019—) ====
Five Questions is an ongoing series of interactive works that pair sculpture and text. In it, Minh asks a set of five simple questions about women: Who is Woman? What is Woman? Where is Woman? Why is Woman? When is Woman? "Writing - in the form of questions - is a way for Hiền Minh to avoid manipulating the viewer’s reading, understanding and perception of the work. Instead of forcing ideas, questions help to expand the thought process." People are invited to interact with the work by writing their answers to these questions and placing them within or upon the sculpture. "In order to ‘extend’ sculpture (from a fixed, finished mass, to a more continuous process), writing - especially in the form of questions - helps to create a power- neutral space. There, Hiền Minh hands the power (to create) to the audience. As long as the questions continue to provoke them, and they continue to interact by providing answers, the work will change shape and live on." The first in the series was The States of Mind (2019) which contains five large female statues in five different poses, and was installed at a historical site and a Buddhist temple named Myorakuji in Fukuoka, Japan. The second in the series was The Invisibility of Female Labour (2020), and was shown at the Spinnerei in Leipzig, Germany in which she focused on the subject of female labour and the inequality system between male and female workers. The third and most recent in this series is The Gods of Expectation: Divine Cycle, Devine Constant, Devine Source no.1 (2021). With this installation, Minh used "magnificent figures of goddesses from multiple indigenous beliefs" such as Đạo Mẫu, a folk religion believed to have originated from matriarchy of ancient Vietnam, to amalgamate with home appliances are "provoking, while also acknowledging, the strength of women in their seeming invisibility" and "challenges our collective understanding of monumentality and femininity, whilst persistently criticizing the social/gender hierarchy deeply embedded in all aspects of life – both traditional and contemporary – in Vietnam".

== Artist book ==
Lê Hiền Minh created an artist book Còn Lại|Rời Rạc in 2012 as a companion piece to the installation Dictionaries. It was acquired by the Joan Flasch Artists' Book Collection which is one of the School of the Art Institute of Chicago's special collections for public viewing in the "study room on the fifth floor of the School's Sharp Building". The book was also collected by Asia Art Archive to "preserve and make information on contemporary art from and of Asia easily accessible in order to facilitate understanding, research and writing in the field."

The Asia Art Archive describes the book:

This object is intended to serve as companion to the installation to further explore memory and its limits. During the process of making Còn Lại| Rời Rạc, the artist rewrote each recollection many times. She arranged, measured and lined them up carefully, like a map. This map operates like a maze, with old things as well as unknown new things living together.

== Recent grants and residencies ==
- Finnish Cultural Foundation Grant (2018)
- Asian Cultural Council Grant (2019)
- Fukuoka Asian Art Museum Residency (2019) Minh is one of six Vietnamese artists invited to participate in the 20-year-old residency program of Fukuoka Asian Art Museum,(which describes itself as "the only museum in the world that systematically collects and exhibits Asian modern and contemporary art").
- Pazifik - Leipzig Residency (2020) Minh is the first Vietnamese artist to win the Pazifik - Leipzig program in which the Goethe-Institut funds for artists from Southeast Asia a three-month residency at the Art and Culture Centre Spinnerei.
- Asian Cultural Council Grant (2022) Minh is one of the three artists in 2022 awarded the Graduate Scholarship from Asian Cultural Council to pursue graduate level education.
- The Ignite Fund (2024) Minh is awarded the Ignite Fund, administered by the Chicago-based nonprofit organization 3Arts as part of the Andy Warhol Foundation for the Visual Arts’ Regional Regranting Program.
- Studios at MASS MoCA (2025) Minh participates in The Studios at MASS MoCA, an artist and writer residency program located within the museum’s factory campus. MASS MoCA is one of the largest centers for contemporary visual and performing arts in the United States.

== Partial list of exhibitions ==
=== Solo ===
- Lê Hiền Minh, Vietart Center, Hanoi, Vietnam (2007)
- Bố Hạo, Viet Nam National Museum of Fine Arts, Hanoi, Vietnam (2012)
- Dó10, Ho Chi Minh city Museum of Fine Arts, Ho Chi Minh City, Vietnam (2013)
- The States of Mind, Myorakuji Temple, Fukuoka, Japan (2019)
- Parallel to Hell, Co-Prosperity, Chicago, United States (2025)

=== Group exhibitions ===
- So Close Yet So Far Away, Incheon Women Artist Biennale, Incheon, South Korea (2009)
- Watusi Regime, Park Amory Avenue, New York, USA (2011)
- The Walker, Ho Chi Minh city Museum of Fine Arts, Ho Chi Minh City, Vietnam (2012)
- The Room, Antique Street, Ho Chi Minh City, Vietnam (2014)
- Hat | Tim Dia Projects, Ho Chi Minh city, Vietnam (2016)
- bugs, birds..equations of the future, Mot++, Ho Chi Minh city, Vietnam (2017)
- Home | Land, Taiwan Annual, Taipei, Taiwan (2017)
- Ke: History of Now, Wedeman Gallery, Massachusetts, USA (2017)
- Bodies Surveyed, San Art, Ho Chi Minh city, Vietnam (2018)
- Divine Feminine, Helsinki, Finland (2019)
- Objekti 6, Espoo Kunsthalle, Finland (2020)
- The Invisibility of Female Labour, LIA Spinnerei, Leipzig, Germany (2020)
- Within / Between / Beneath / Upon, The Factory Contemporary Arts Center, Ho Chi Minh City, Vietnam (2021)
- Making & Experiencing Asian Cultures, Fukuoka Asian Art Museum, Fukuoka, Japan (2021)
- Pacific Leipzig, Deutsches Haus Ho Chi Minh City, Ho Chi Minh city, Vietnam (2022)
- Tongue & Nail, Iceberg Projects, Chicago, USA (2023)
- A Village Before US, John David Mooney Foundation, Chicago, USA (2023)
- Disobedient Bodies: Reclaiming Her, Sundaram Tagore Gallery, Singapore (2025)
