= Bạch Thông district =

Coordinates: 22.083°N 105.833°E

Bach Thong district Huyện Bạch Thông
- District
- Seal
- Interactive map of Bach Thong district
- Country: Vietnam
- Province: Bắc Kạn
- Capital: Phủ Thông

Area
  - Land: 211 sq mi (546 km^{2})

Population (2003)
  - Total: 31,585
- Time zone: UTC+07:00 (Indochina Time)

Bạch Thông is a former rural district of Bắc Kạn province in the Northeast region of Vietnam. As of 2003 the district had a population of 31,585. The district covers an area of 546 km^{2}. The district capital lies at Phủ Thông.

== Administrative divisions ==
The district is divided into one township (the capital Phủ Thông) and communes:

1. Phương Linh
2. Vi Hương
3. Tú Trĩ
4. Lục Bình
5. Đôn Phong
6. Dương Phong
7. Quang Thuận
8. Hà Vị
9. Quân Bình
10. Cẩm Giàng
11. Tân Tiến
12. Sĩ Bình
13. Vũ Muộn
14. Cao Sơn
15. Nguyên Phúc
16. Mỹ Thanh
