= Print culture in Vietnam =

Woodblock printing were mostly done by Buddhist temples in Vietnam. Prints such as those of Đông Hồ represented the ancient traditions of Tết, or Vietnamese Lunar New Year celebrations. Other woodcut prints included Kim Hoàng paintings and Hàng Trống paintings. Printing technology that was introduced by the French colonial era introduced the printing press, which also saw the increase of using the Vietnamese Latin Alphabet, Chữ Quốc ngữ, as opposed Hán-Nôm (Classical Chinese and demotic Vietnamese-Chinese script). However, historical and ancient traditions of Vietnamese woodblock printing pre-colonial times were not lost through changes such as the "Buddhist Revival".

== Pre-colonial period: 17th–19th century ==
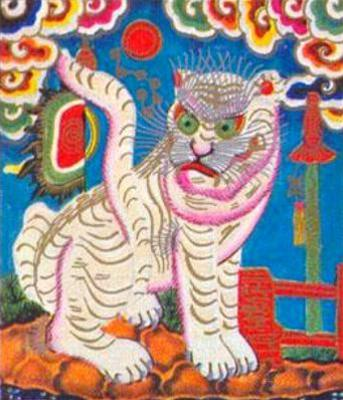
The White Tiger (Bạch hổ) picture of Hang Trong painting. The author is unknown because it is a traditional painting dated back to the 17th century.

Buddhist temples were key sites of print culture from the 17th–19th century, translating, printing, and disseminating key sutras to lay populations in both urban and rural villages. During this period, more than one hundred temples served as active printing houses, and Buddhist temples comprised roughly one-third of all woodblock printing houses in 19th century Vietnam. Although Vietnam already had a vibrant print culture in the pre-colonial period, the circulation of these woodblock prints were largely limited to temples and not yet widespread in secular society or the public sphere. This would only change during the "Buddhist Revival", when printing took on modern forms through technologies like the printing press.

== Colonial period: 1915–1940 ==
During the early 20th century, a combination of French policies and technological breakthroughs led to the rapid emergence of modern print culture in Vietnam's urban centres. Many new periodicals, journals, and newspapers were created during this time. The Vietnamese published 13,381 different books and tracts between 1922 and 1940, and that from 1918 to 1939, at least 163 Vietnamese-language periodicals appeared in Saigon. However, these statistics do not include the clandestine production and circulation of clandestine books, tracts, and newspapers that evaded French censorship. While estimating the actual readership of these texts is difficult, these emergent forms of print likely included some millions of people, assuming that the majority of readers were not subscribers. All in all, at least 15 million bound publications were printed in Vietnam from 1930 to 1945, which amounted to eight or nine books per literate individual.

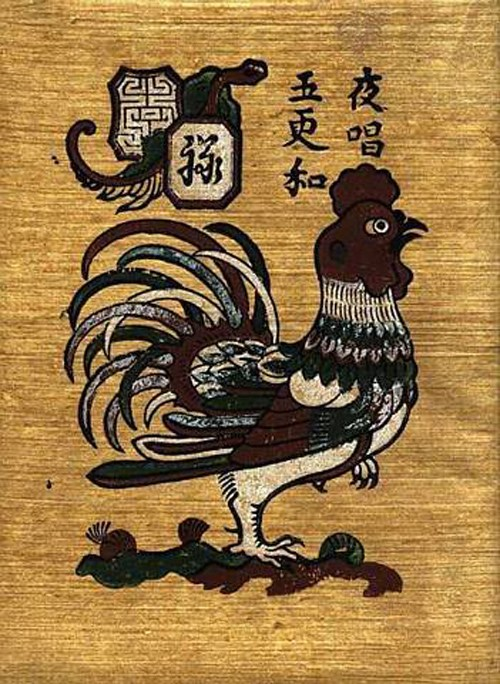
Đại cát (大吉, The great Goodness), a woodblock print, produced by artisans from the village of Dong Ho in Vietnam.

French colonial policies played a large role in shaping the nature of Vietnam's print culture through direct and indirect ways, such by introducing the printing press and liberating the public sphere. Governor-General Sarraut's decision to allow any resident of Vietnam to start and run a periodical was a decisive factor in explaining Vietnam's unusually rich print culture. Some Vietnamese intellectuals were also introduced to Western-style journalism and modern printing press technologies after attending global exhibitions sponsored by the French. Nguyễn Văn Vĩnh's visit to the 1906 Marseille colonial exposition was so formative that Nguyen threw himself into creating a printing house and western-style press upon his return to Vietnam. Nguyen also developed friendships and connections with influential French figures such as Ernest Babut and F.H. Schneider, a famous printer and associate of the Vietnamese press, who taught Nguyen the basics of printing, publishing, and advertising. The French also established institutions like public libraries that made reading much more accessible to the wider Vietnamese public. The Hanoi Central Library (Bibliothèque centrale de Hanoi) was a formative space of urban social life that served as a site of social and civic importance.

== Influential periodicals, publishers, and literary groups ==
Influential newspapers, periodicals, and journals in this time period included Nam Phong (Southern Wind), Phong Hoa and Ngay Nay. These publications contributed to a burgeoning public sphere and shaped political and intellectual currents in Vietnam's urban centers. Major debates centred around tradition vs. modernity, anti-colonialism, and nationalist consciousness. Print culture was not just a vehicle for these ideas, it was also an active manifestation of them. Print culture became a symbol of modernity, a vital cultural tool that could help Vietnam create an alternative future. For many intellectuals, the publication of these prints represented a self-conscious attempt in encouraging Vietnamese cultural nationalism, and fomenting an emerging national identity.

Publishing houses such as Đời Nay saw their work as part of the reform project, and wanted to prove that the Vietnamese were capable of producing books similar to those produced by the great publishing houses of Europe and America. Many intellectuals feared that foreigners would scorn Vietnamese books and literature, and felt that the main purpose of book publishing was to build a body of literature for a modern Vietnamese nation. Intellectuals like Nguyen Van Vinh would not only start their own printing houses – they also formed literary collectives like the Tự Lực Văn Đoàn (Self-Reliant Literary Group), or joined existing groups like the Tonkin Free School in an attempt to promote a renovation of Vietnamese culture and society along Western lines.

== French censorship ==
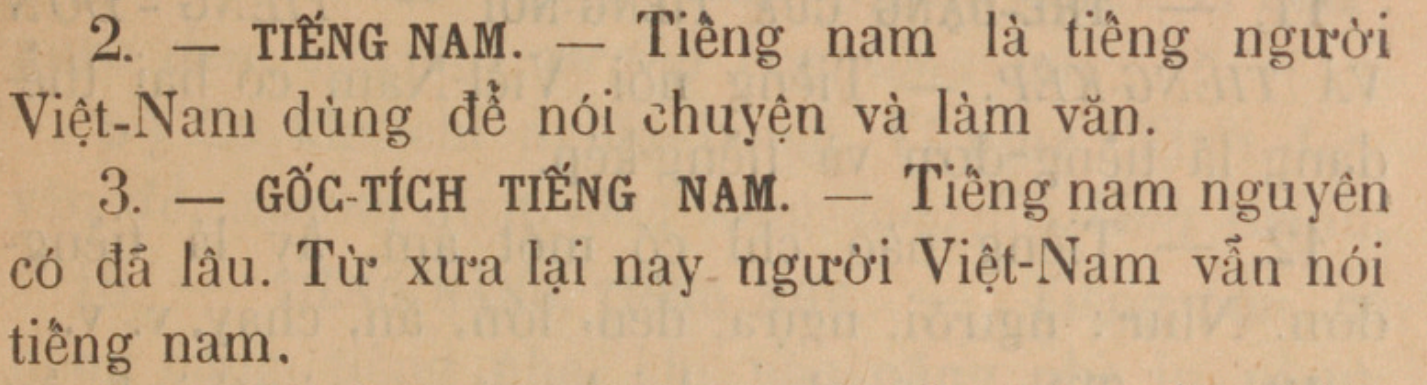
A piece of text describing the language of Vietnam as being called the "Southern language", or "Tiếng Nam", in an educational book from 1925.

Even as the French permitted certain forms of print to flourish, they also actively curtailed others. The vast majority of applications to start newspapers or journals were rejected, often for reasons such as "four journals in Annamese already exist" or because "the applicant's brother frequents cafes where young radicals often assemble." These censorship policies influenced not just the content of prints, but also its form. Because few publishers dared to publish illegal tracts, the Communists had to print publications themselves, relying on more primitive printing methods that gave rise to significant aesthetic differences. Communist leaflets tended to be hand-lettered, printed using cheap-ink or gelatin slabs, and hand-drawn. In contrast, Buddhist and Confucian prints tended to be printed on linotype.

However, repression was selective, not totalizing, for the French practiced a politics of discretion that differed across geography, ideology, and degree of extremity. Differences in political climates in the North vs. the South produced different kinds of prints across both content and genre due to the need for creative adaptations to resist censorship. Those in Annam or Tonkin could only write columns for Southern newspapers using pseudonyms, advocate for political reform under the guise of discussing culture, or turn to writing books (especially fiction) which were not subjected to prior censorship. In contrast, Southern debates were largely political, focusing on issues such as electoral reform and native participation in decision-making bodies.

== Popular prints ==
Many diverse forms of print cultures circulated during this period, including not just newspapers, journals, and periodicals, but also novels, pamphlets, sutras, almanacs, textbooks, and so forth. Of all the quoc-ngu publications printed between 1923 and 1942, only 10% consisted of modernizing essays on law, economics, philosophy, and linguistics, whereas 24% were modern novels and short story collections, 6% weare theatrical reprints and dramatic presentations such as reform opera, 19% were recreational reading such as traditional literature, folktales, poetry, and popular humor; and 20% were religious publications such as tracts, prayer books, ritual chants, and catechisms.

Most of the periodicals published during this period were not centered around politics but were dedicated to a variety of topics that included "pharmacy, horse-racing, housewifery, economics, ethics, motorcycles, radios, agriculture, airplanes, contemporary cinema, potboiler romances, Catholic living, rural pedagogy, and classical Chinese poetry". Many journals also published not just political essays, but also poetry, novels, short stories, folk songs, dramas, fables, and proverbs. Similarly, writers like Vũ Trọng Phụng were ideologically fluid, for Vu did not subscribe to any particular foreign writer or literary movement, wrote across literary genres and styles, and did not discriminate between "high" and "low" culture.

== The economics of printing ==
Publishers' printing choices reflected not just political commitments, but also practical economic concerns. The Đời Nay Publishing House was in part set up out of a concern that capitalism would corrode Vietnam's print culture, and intellectuals like Nhị Linh lamented that "currently readers only like to read novels...and all those profit-seeking publishing houses print only novels. And no one bothers to print books about history, geography, science, philosophy, etc." There was also a vibrant market for reading books. Hawkers and street stall owners played a large role in hawking books to the public, and many shops on Transverse Street, Hemp Street, Hue Street and others in Hanoi hung out signs with the words "Stories for Rent", where for two sous, visitors could borrow a book for reading pleasure.

== The limits of print culture ==
Print culture during this time was also largely an elite, educated, urban phenomenon, and did not necessarily represent "Vietnam" more broadly.

In reality, very few people could read and write in the various scripts that circulated during this period. Most rural Vietnamese remained illiterate, especially on the more complex scripts of Chữ Hán Nôm, and relied on oral rather than print culture.

Authors and producers of print culture often claimed to speak on behalf of the people they sought to represent, in particular, the Communists. However, many villagers did not understand the ideas and vocabularies the Communists utilized and Communist pamphlets and newspapers often included glossaries of terms translating borrowed Communist ideas into local vernacular. Similarly, many early articles in Nam Phong contained so many new words that readers complained they were nearly impossible to understand. Men were also much more likely than women to be able to read and write. In a village in rural north Annam, only 16.7% of males could read Vietnamese in the romanized/Latin script, compared to only 1.4% of females.

Further, while Confucian prints were directed at literate male members of the elite, Buddhist prints had a greater appeal amongst women. There were also significant geographical differences. Print culture in the 1920s was largely an urban phenomenon dominated by Saigon and Hanoi, as these cities monopolized the production of printed matter and acted as literary, religious, and political centers. Still, pockets of literacy and learning existed across the countryside, and circulated via periodic markets, itinerant hawkers, and Buddhist temples.

== Works cited ==
- Marr, David G. (1984). Vietnamese tradition on trial, 1920–1945. University of California Press. ISBN 978-0-520-05081-5. OCLC 35572516.
- McHale, Shawn Frederick (2004). Print and power: Confucianism, communism, and Buddhism in the making of modern Vietnam. University of Hawaiʻi Press. ISBN 0-8248-2655-8. OCLC 52030435.
- Nguyen, Martina Thucnhi (2021). On Our Own Strength: The Self-Reliant Literary Group and Cosmopolitan Nationalism in Late Colonial Vietnam. University of Hawaiʻi Press. doi:10.1515/9780824886738. ISBN 978-0-8248-8673-8. OCLC 1238067341. S2CID 242462187.
- Peycam, Philippe M. F (2012). The birth of Vietnamese Political Journalism: Saigon, 1916–1930. New York: Columbia University Press. ISBN 978-0-231-15850-3. OCLC 835335346.
- Tai, Hue-Tam Ho (1996). Radicalism and the origins of the Vietnamese revolution. Harvard University Press. ISBN 978-0-674-74613-8. OCLC 1034646698.
- Womack, Sarah Whitney (2003). Colonialism and the collaborationist agenda: Pham Quynh, print culture, and the politics of persuasion in colonial Vietnam (PhD thesis). University of Michigan. OCLC 55873694.
- Zinoman, Peter (2011). "Provincial Cosmopolitanism: Vu Trong Phung's Foreign Literary Experiences". In Hau, Caroline S.; Tejapira, Kasian (eds.). Traveling nation-makers: Transnational flows and movements in the making of modern Southeast Asia. NUS Press; Kyoto University Press. ISBN 978-9971-69-547-7. OCLC 1261863417.
