= Ho Chi Minh City Museum of Fine Arts =

Art museum in Vietnam

Coordinates: 10°46′10″N 106°42′00″E

- Bảo tàng Mỹ thuật Thành phố Hồ Chí Minh
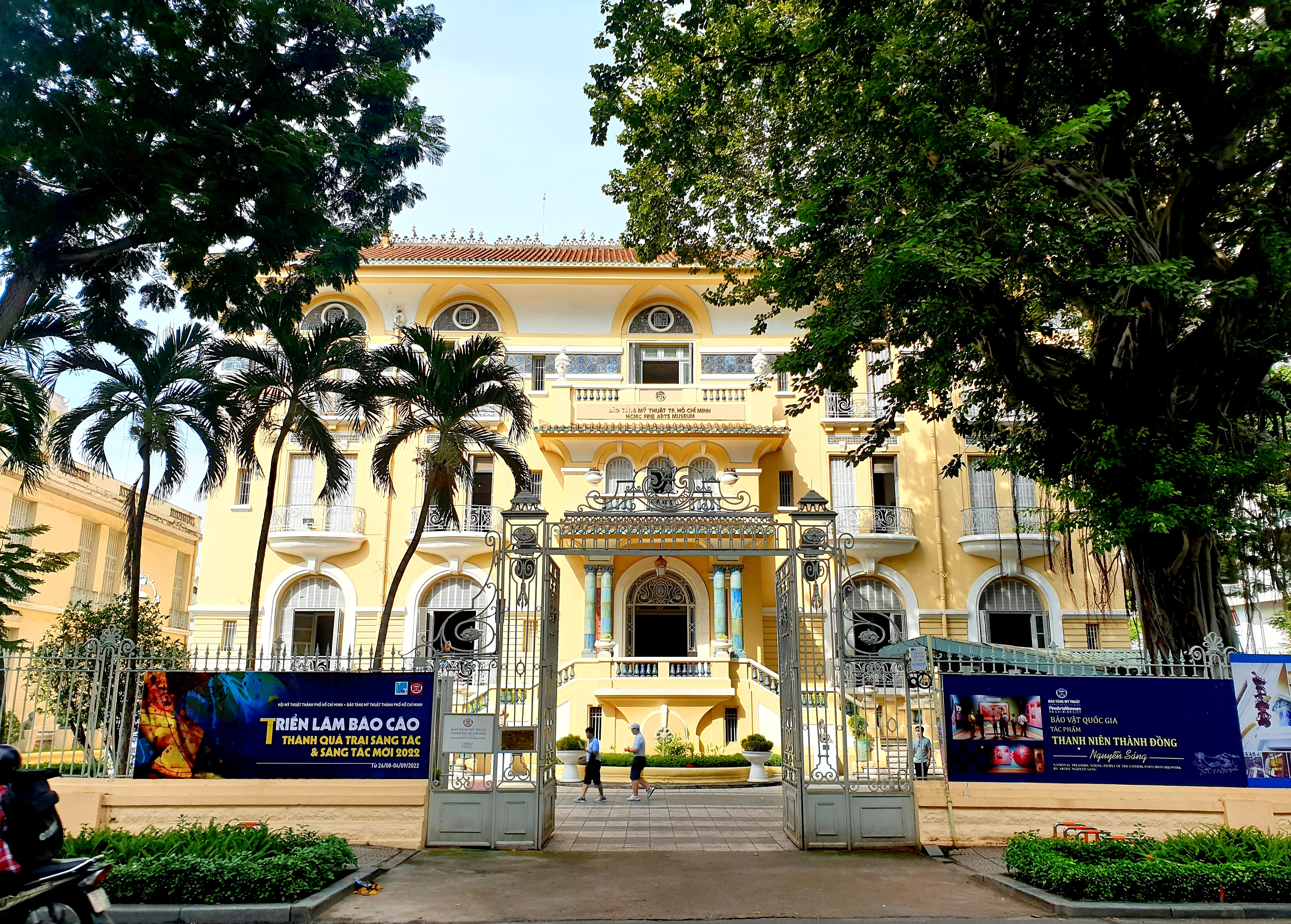
- Main entrance on Phó Đức Chính Street
- Established: September 5, 1987
- Location: 97-97A Phó Đức Chính Street, Bến Thành, District 1, Ho Chi Minh City
- Type: Art museum
- Public transit access: L1 L2 L4 Ben Thanh station
- Website: baotangmythuattphcm.com.vn

Ho Chi Minh City Museum of Fine Arts (Vietnamese: Bảo tàng Mỹ thuật Thành phố Hồ Chí Minh) is the major art museum of Ho Chi Minh City, Vietnam, and second in the country only to the Vietnam National Museum of Fine Arts in Hanoi.

The museum covers three three-floor buildings which house a collection featuring Vietnamese art works in sculpture, oil, silk painting and lacquer painting, as well as traditional styles including woodcut paintings in the Hàng Trống, Đông Hồ, and Kim Hoàng styles, as well as Vietnamese ceramics and a collection of ancient Buddhist art. The first floor also includes a commercial gallery of art works. Archaeological exhibits such as some of the country's best Champa and Óc Eo relics are displayed on the third floor.

The main building was constructed by a French architect Rivera between 1929 and 1934 as a villa for the Hua (Hui-Bon-Hoa; Traditional Chinese: 黄文華; Sino-Vietnamese: Huỳnh Văn Hoà) family. The museum moved there in 1987.

== Gallery ==
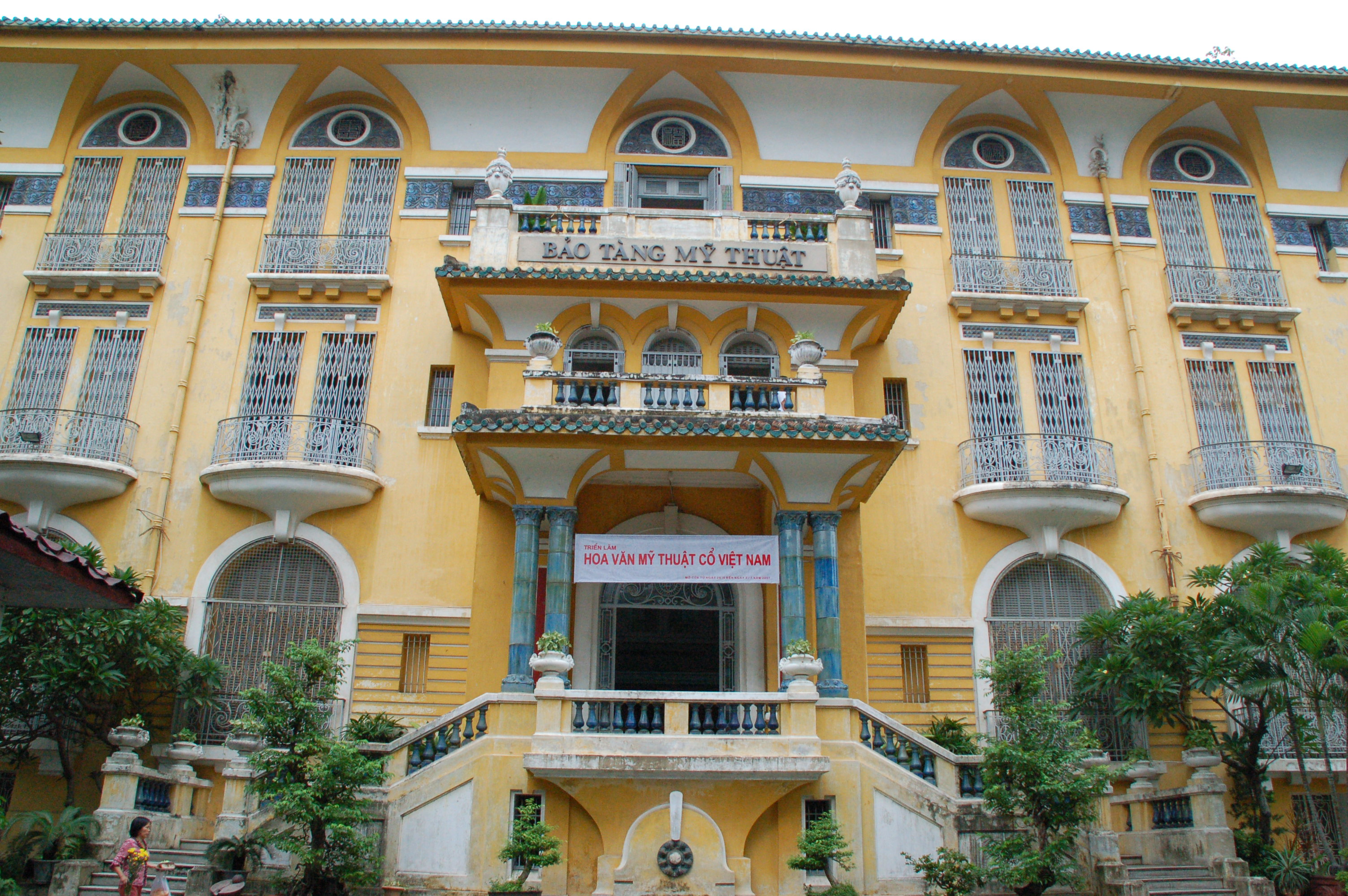
Front door of the building

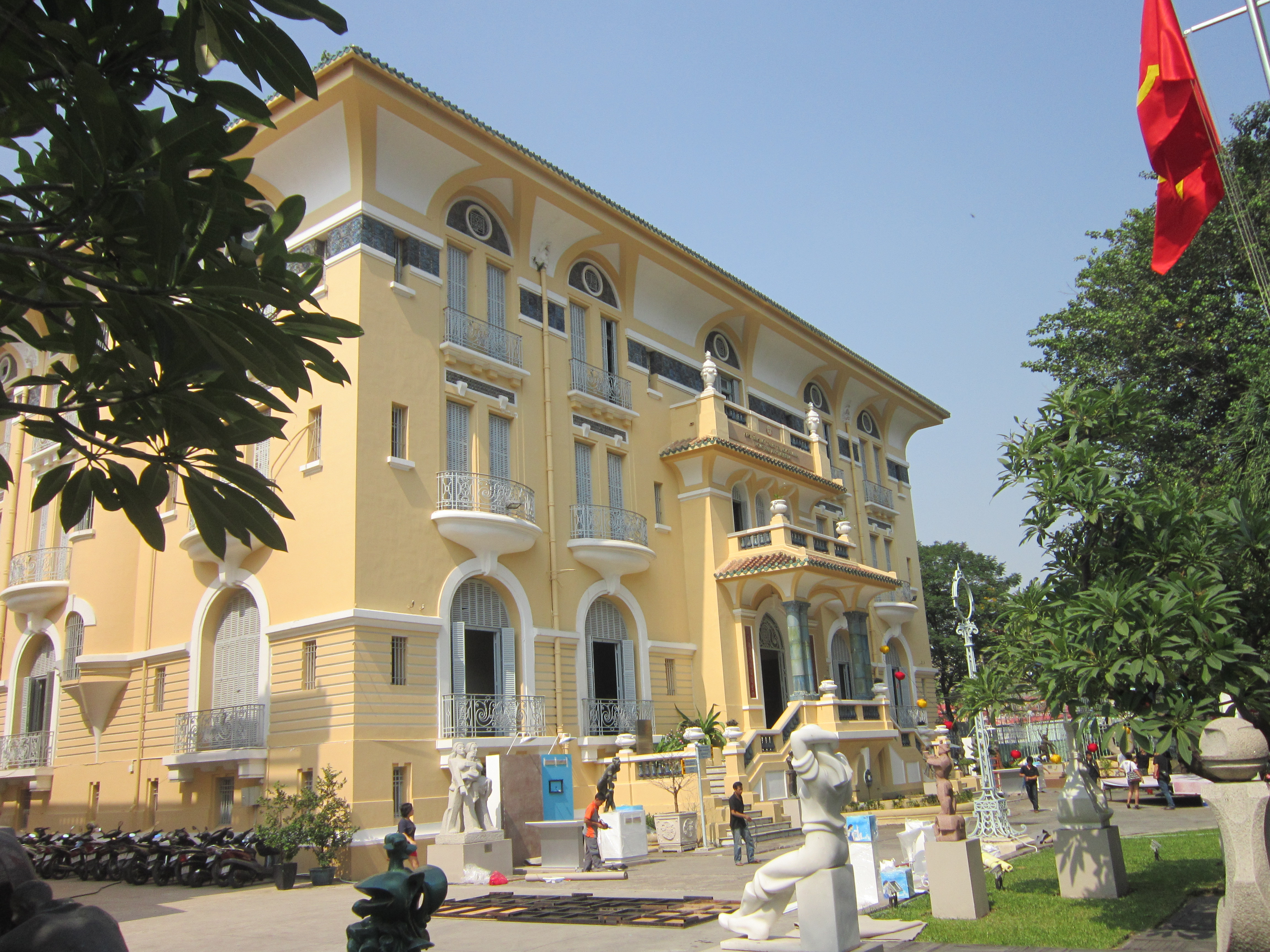
Another side of the museum

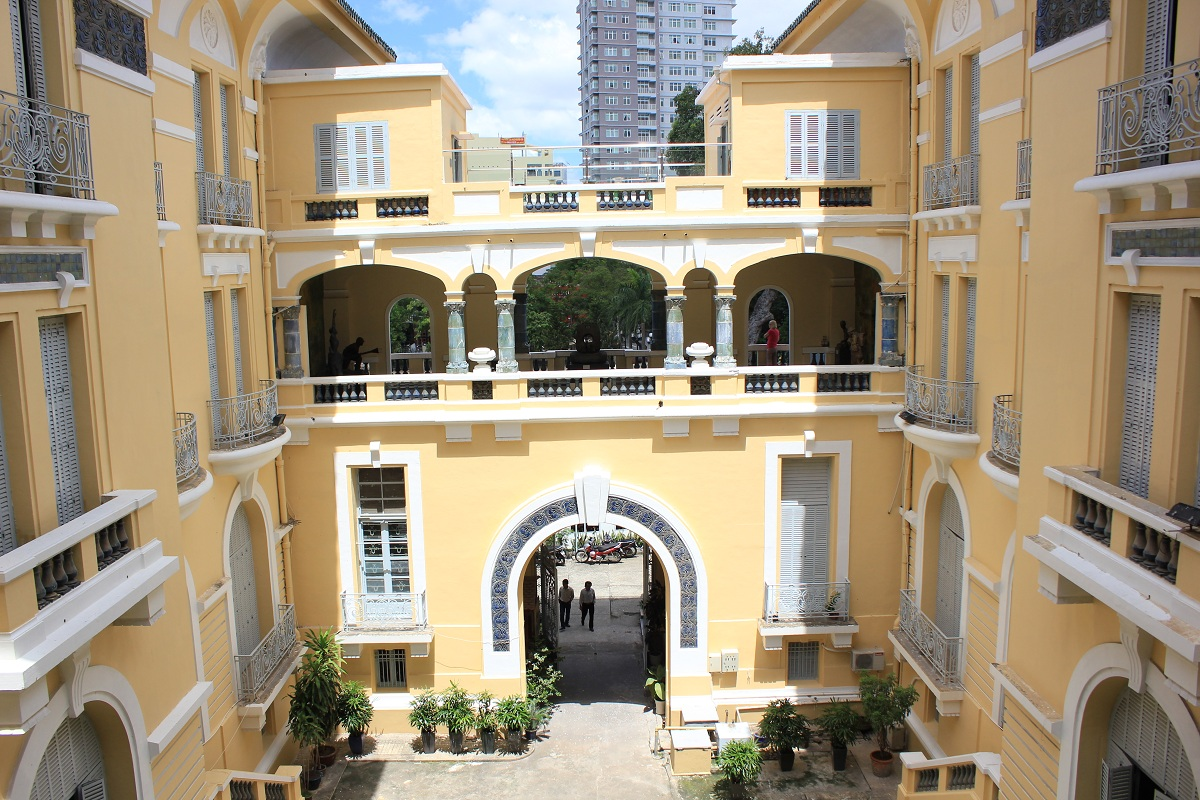
Grounds of the museum

== See also ==
- Museum of Ho Chi Minh City
