= Thuận Thành =

- Ward
- Academy of Security Engineering and Technology
- Interactive map of Thuận Thành
- Coordinates: 21.051956576722734°N 106.0910590154706°E
- Country: Vietnam
- Region: Red River Delta
- City: Bắc Ninh
- Established: 16 June 2025
- People's Committee headquarters: Siêu Loại Street, Administrative Center area

Area
  - Total: 26.58 km^{2} (10.26 sq mi)

Population (31 December 2024)
  - Total: 52,318
  - Density: 1,968/km^{2} (5,100/sq mi)
- Area code: 09400
- Website: thuanthanh.bacninh.gov.vn

Thuận Thành is a ward of Bắc Ninh, Vietnam. The ward inherited its name from the former Thuận Thành town in Bắc Ninh province.

Thuận Thành Ward forms part of the Thuận Thành Grade III urban area of Bắc Ninh. The ward is home to the intangible cultural heritage of Đông Hồ folk painting, which is inscribed on UNESCO's List of Intangible Cultural Heritage in Need of Urgent Safeguarding.

== History ==
The name Thuận Thành Ward was inherited from the former Thuận Thành town.

On 16 June 2025:

- The National Assembly of Vietnam adopted Resolution No. 203/2025/QH15 amending and supplementing several articles of the Constitution of the Socialist Republic of Vietnam. Under the resolution, district-level administrative units throughout the country ceased to operate from 1 July 2025.
- The Standing Committee of the National Assembly adopted Resolution No. 1658/NQ-UBTVQH15 on the reorganization of commune-level administrative units in Bắc Ninh province in 2025. Under the resolution, the entire natural area and population of the wards of Hồ, Song Hồ, and Gia Đông, together with the commune of Đại Đồng Thành, were merged to form a new ward named Thuận Thành.

On 24 August 2026, the National Assembly adopted Resolution No. 39/2026/QH16 establishing the municipality of Bắc Ninh from the entire natural area and population of Bắc Ninh province. The resolution took effect on 20 September 2026. Thuận Thành Ward has since been part of Bắc Ninh.
