= Cẩm Giàng =

Cẩm Giàng may refer to several locations in Vietnam:

- Cẩm Giàng, Bắc Kạn
- Cẩm Giàng District
