= Nguyen Phuc =

Nguyen Phuc may refer to:

- Nguyên Phúc, a commune in Vietnam.
- Nguyễn Phúc, a Vietnamese royal family
