= Luy Lâu =

First capital of Chinese-ruled Vietnam

Luy Lâu / Liên Lâu
- Thành Dâu (Dâu Citadel)
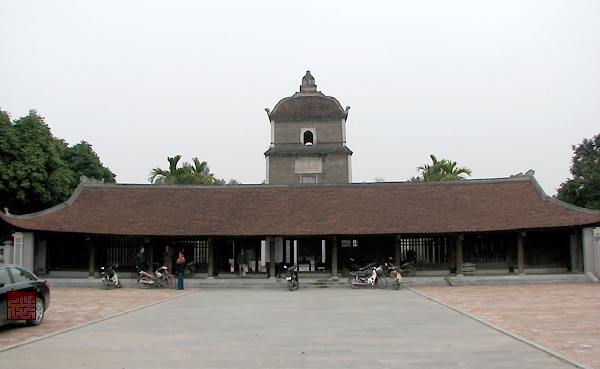
- Diên Ứng Pagoda at the center of Luy Lâu Citadel.

- Location within Northern Vietnam.
- 21°02′18″N 106°02′59″E
- Type: Citadel
- Periods: Han Dynasty
- Cultures: Hanziphere
- Location: Thanh Khương little zone, Thuận Thành ward, Bắc Ninh province
- Region: Giao Chỉ

Luy Lâu (Nôm: 羸𨻻) (< Middle Chinese ZS *liuᴇ-ləu < Eastern Han Chinese *lyai-lo (Note: Schuessler, Axel. (2009) Minimal Old Chinese and Later Han Chinese. Honolulu : University of Hawai'i p. 223, 151.)) or Liên Lâu (Nôm: 𨏩𨻻) was the first capital of the Han commandery of Jiaozhi/Giao Chỉ from 111 BC following China's conquest of Nanyue/Nam Viet till 106 BC. present.

== History ==
According to the surveys of researcher Philippe Papin, at the beginning of Công Nguyên, the Southeastern area of modern Hanoi was still under the sea level. Therefore, it was very difficult to settle down. (Note: Philippe Papin, Histoire de Hanoï, Fayard, Paris, 2001.) (Note: Pierre Asselin, Pierre Brocheux, Christopher E. Goscha, Pierre Grosser, Annick Guénel, François Guillemot, Andrew Hardy, Michel Hoàng, Pierre Journoud, Anne Marie Moulin, Philippe Papin, Emmanuel Poisson, Dominique Rolland, Hugues Tertrais, Benoît de Tréglodé..., Le Viêt-Nam depuis 2000 ans, De La Republique Eds, Paris, 2017.)

Since the middle of the belonging to the North, according to the records of the officials from the mainland China, the area of modern Bắc Ninh province was almost swampy.

Luy Lâu was also the headquarters of the larger province of Jiaozhou/Giao châu and the center of China's maritime trade on the Gulf of Tonkin and South China Sea. The ancient citadel is at Thanh Khương ward in Thuận Thành town in the province of Bắc Ninh. (Note: Báo Bắc Ninh, Thủ phủ Luy Lâu 2008. "Sau thời kì thành Cổ Loa là kinh đô nước ta thời An Dương Vương thì địa điểm Dâu (nay thuộc xã Thanh Khương - Thuận Thành) trở thành thủ phủ nước ta dưới thời Bắc thuộc kéo dài hàng nghìn năm với các tên gọi khác nhau" : Luy Lâu, Liên Lâu, Dinh Lâu, Long Uyên, Long Biên.) (Note: The Vietnam guidebook : with Angkor Wat - Page 42 Barbara Cohen, Fredric M. Kaplan - 1993 "In 111 BC, the Han Dynasty completely annexed Nam Viet as a Chinese province called Giao Chi or Chiao Chih. The town of Luy Lau, southeast of present-day Hanoi, was the ancient capital of Giao Chi. Although subjugation meant having to...".)

Luy Lâu became a major center for Buddhism in Vietnam. (Note: Rebuilding Religious Experience - Vietnamese Refugees in America - Page 20 Linh Hoang - 2008 "However, it was only after the Chinese came to An-Nam that the Buddhists erected a center at Luy-lau which was the capital of Giao Chi and was a popular place visited by many Buddhist missionaries. Luy-lau became a major Buddhist center ".) Although the Roman embassies probably arrived at the later capital Long Biên, it may have been the earlier Luy Lâu that was the origin of Ptolemy's Kottinagara.

On 7 October 2024, the Vietnam National Museum of History and the Bắc Ninh Department of Culture, Sports and Tourism jointly conducted an excavation at the Luy Lâu ancient citadel relic.

== See also ==
- Thuận Thành
- Long Biên
