= Đông Hồ =

Village in Vietnam

Đông Hồ is a village in the Song Hồ commune (làng Đông Hồ, xã Song Hồ), in Thuận Thành District, Bắc Ninh Province, Vietnam. It is one of several well known "craft villages", with the other most notable ones being Non Nước marble village (làng đá Non Nước) and Cam Ne mat village (Làng chiếu Cẩm Nê) in Da Nang, the Bát Tràng pottery village and Vạn Phúc silk village (also called làng lụa Hà Đông) near Hanoi, and the Phước Kiều bronze casting village (Làng đúc đồng Phước Kiều) in Quảng Nam Province.

The village gives its name to Đông Hồ painting, a Vietnamese painting style from this village.
