= Dâu Temple =

Buddhist temple in northern Vietnam

Coordinates: 21.0371°N 106.0416°E

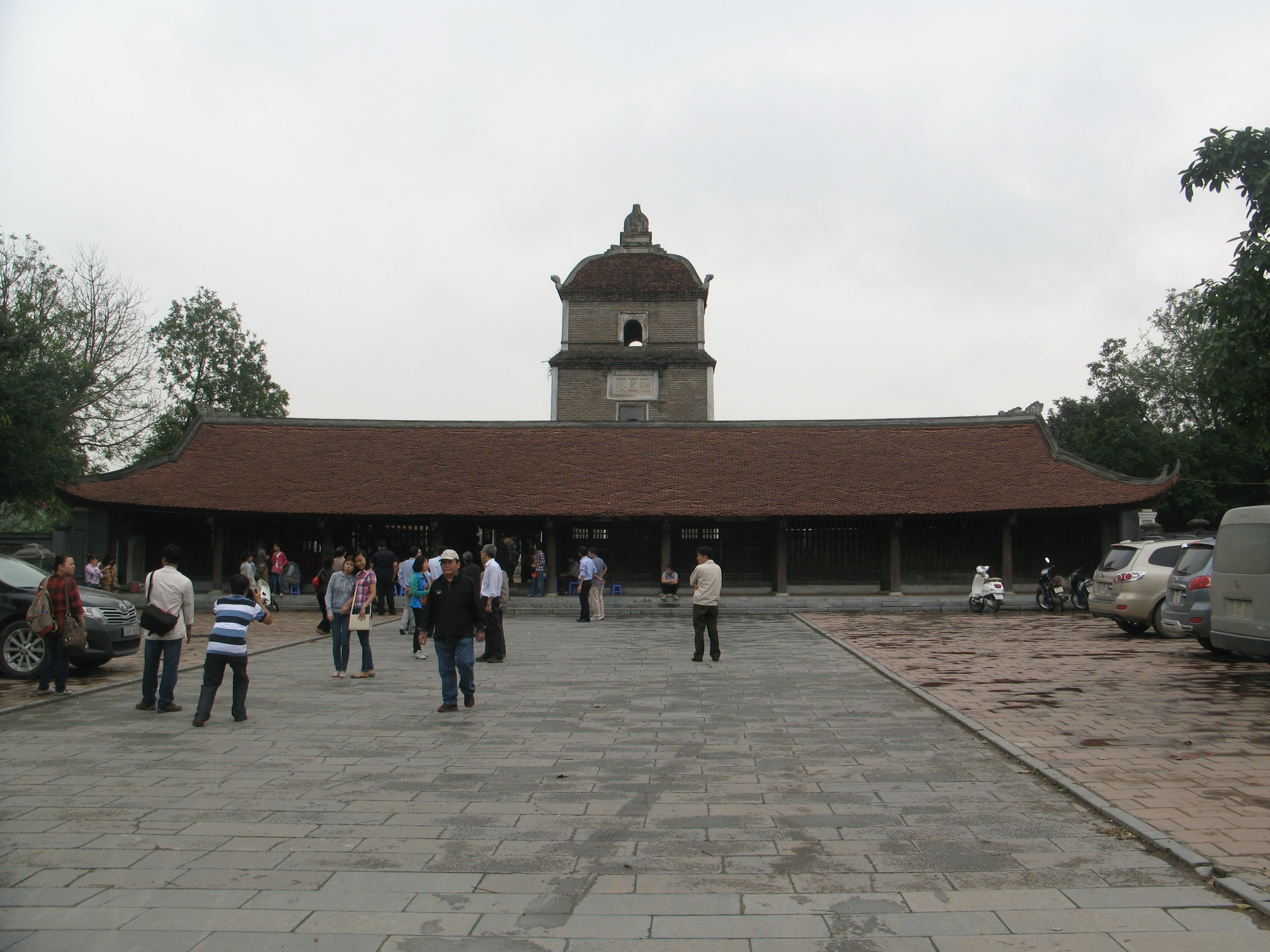
Panoramic view of the main hall of Dâu Temple

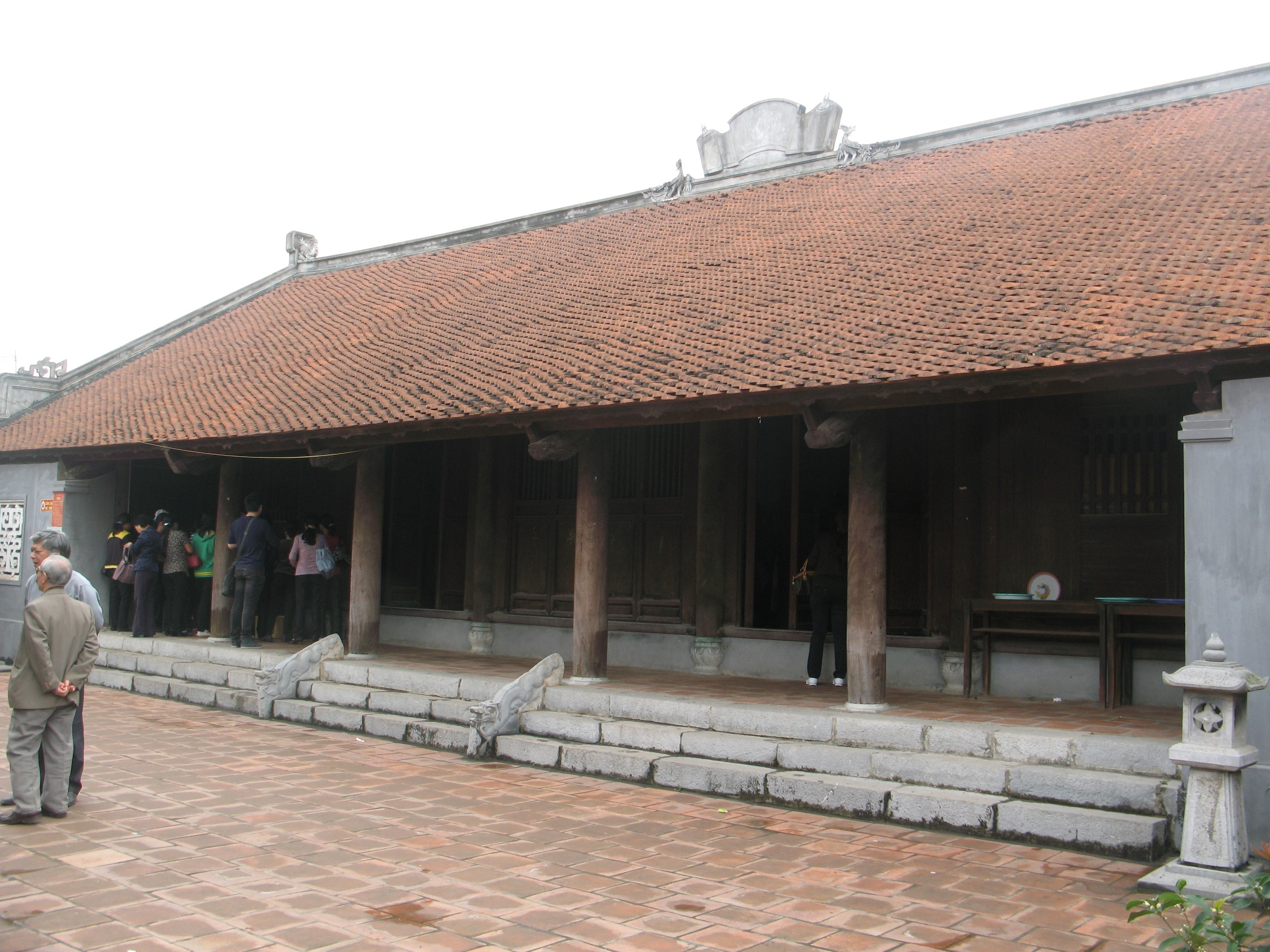
Another hall of Dâu Temple

Dâu Temple (Vietnamese: chùa Dâu), also known under formal names: Diên Ứng (延應寺), Pháp Vân (法雲寺), and Cổ Châu, is a major Buddhist temple in Thanh Khương commune, huyện Thuận Thành, Bắc Ninh Province. Located some 30 km east of Hanoi, the temple historically marks the ancient settlement of Luy Lâu, once an important center of Buddhism in Vietnam. 500m farther away lies the Temple of Sĩ Nhiếp, the remarkable Chinese Governor of Jiaozhi at that time.

== History ==
Both the pagoda and the temple date from the 2nd century with construction in 187-226 AD. The temple is the oldest documented Buddhist one in Vietnam. With Luy Lâu being an entrepot between China and India, Dâu Temple was the stopping point for both Northern (Mahayana) and Southern (Theravada) Buddhist pilgrims and monks.

== Architecture ==
Dâu Temple consists of two small parallel structures and one even smaller on the right side. Architecturally, the Sĩ Nhiếp Temple (photo) contains a number of important buildings in Vietnamese Buddhist art. At the center is a large three-story brick tower named Hoa Phong, built in 1737. Other historical pieces include stone and wooden statuaries, a number of which predates the 10th century.

== Temple festival ==
Dâu Temple hosts the annual temple festival with ritual offerings to Buddha and musical performances for the masses on the 8th of the Fourth lunar month, attracting large numbers of worshippers from all across the Red River Delta.
