= Phủ Thông =

- Commune
- Location in Vietnam
- Coordinates: 22°20′N 105°54′E
- Country: Vietnam
- Province: Thái Nguyên Province

Area
  - Total: 0.32 sq mi (0.84 km^{2})

Population (2009)
  - Total: 1,683
  - Density: 5,190/sq mi (2,004/km^{2})
- Time zone: UTC+07:00

Phủ Thông is a commune (xã) of Thái Nguyên Province, in Vietnam.

In June 2025, Phủ Thông Commune was established through the merger of the entire natural area and population of Vi Hương Commune (natural area: 21.50 km²; population: 2,756), Phủ Thông Town (natural area: 22.00 km²; population: 3,781), Tân Tú Commune (natural area: 25.14 km²; population: 3,957), and Lục Bình Commune (natural area: 28.31 km²; population: 2,826) of Bạch Thông District.
