= Vĩnh Thông, Thái Nguyên =

Coordinates: 22.2500°N 105.9694°E

Vĩnh Thông
- Commune and village
- Interactive map of Vĩnh Thông
- Country: Vietnam
- Province: Thái Nguyên Province
- Time zone: UTC+07:00

Vĩnh Thông is a commune (xã) and village in Thái Nguyên Province, in Vietnam.

In June 2025, Vĩnh Thông Commune was established through the merger of the entire natural area and population of Sỹ Bình Commune (natural area: 27.52 km²; population: 1,934), Vũ Muộn Commune (natural area: 38.59 km²; population: 1,760), and Cao Sơn Commune (natural area: 63.45 km²; population: 937) of Bạch Thông District.
