= Hàng Trống painting =

Genre of Vietnamese woodcut painting

- Tranh Hàng Trống (Vietnamese)
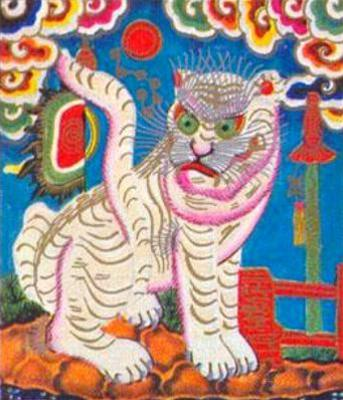
- Artist: Unknown
- Type: Vietnamese woodcut painting
- Condition: Tradition almost lost; authentic paintings found in museums or galleries

Hàng Trống painting (Vietnamese: Tranh Hàng Trống) is a genre of Vietnamese woodcut painting that originated from the area of Hàng Trống and Hàng Nón streets in the Old Quarter of Hanoi, Vietnam. In the past, Hàng Trống painting was an essential element of the Tết Nguyên Đán holiday in Hanoi, but today this tradition has almost disappeared and authentic Hàng Trống paintings are found only in museums or art galleries. However, the art of making Hàng Trống paintings is always considered a symbol of traditional culture and aesthetic value of Vietnam.

== Themes and making ==
The common themes in Hàng Trống paintings are spiritual and cultural symbols such as the white tiger (hổ trắng) or carp (cá chép), which indicate a stronger influence of Buddhism and Taoism than in Đông Hồ painting. However, besides the pictures of worshipping themes, Hàng Trống craftsmen also made paintings with folk themes like Đông Hồ such as Bịt mắt bắt dê (blind-man's buff), Rồng rắn (following the leader) or Thầy đồ Cóc (the toad scholar) for the decoration of families during the Tết holiday. The aesthetic value of Hàng Trống painting is more urban than Đông Hồ pictures which are made in the countryside and often reflect a farmer's perspective. Some popular examples of Hàng Trống painting are Ngũ hổ (Five Tigers), Lý ngư vọng nguyệt (Carp Looking at the Moon), Tứ bình (Four female musicians) and Tố nữ (Virgin Girl).

In making a Hàng Trống painting, the craftsman starts with woodblocks to print black outlines, then draws the details and finally colours the picture in by hand. Because the main part of the process is made by the craftsman's hands, Hàng Trống pictures are slightly different from one to another, thus they become more valuable for the fastidious customers in Hanoi. The paper used in making Hàng Trống painting is called Xuyến chỉ paper (giấy Xuyến chỉ), which differs from the natural colour paper of Đông Hồ painting. Hàng Trống craftsmen colourize pictures with pigments, and therefore the tone of Hàng Trống paintings is usually bright and attractive with principal colours being pink, blue, green, red and yellow.

== Gallery ==
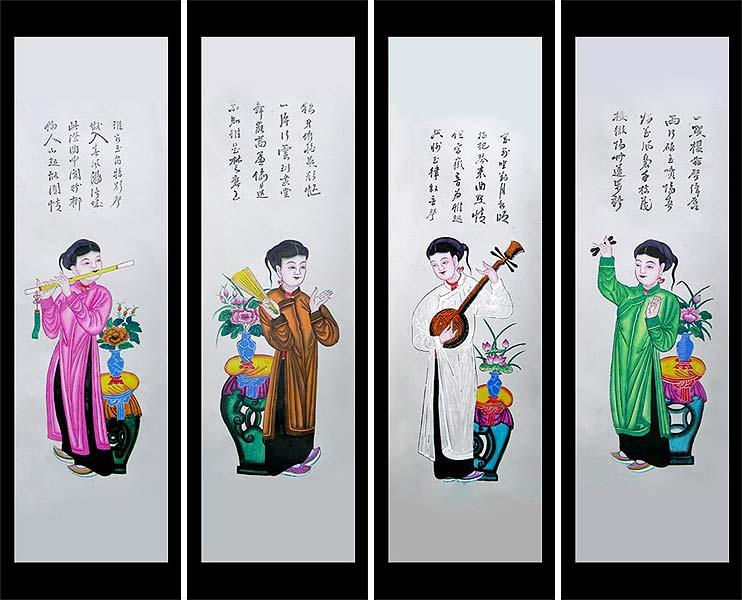
Tố nữ, a popular artwork of the Hàng Trống painting

== History ==
The origin of Hàng Trống painting dates back to the 16th century during the reign of the Lê dynasty. Different from the countryside Đông Hồ, the manufacturing area of Hang Trong painting is located in the Tiêu Túc (later changed to Thuận Mỹ) district in the very heart of Hanoi which is now the quarter between Hàng Trống, Hàng Nón, Hàng Hòm and Hàng Quạt streets. This was one of the few places where folk paintings were made in Vietnam during the dynastic time. In the past, Hàng Trống craftsmen often began to make pictures in the eleventh and twelfth months of the Vietnamese calendar so that they could meet with the high demand during the Tết holiday when a Hàng Trống painting was indispensable for each Hanoi family. For this reason Hàng Trống painting, besides Đông Hồ, was also called Tết painting (tranh Tết). Hàng Trống craftsmen also produced worshipping pictures for Taoist temples and Buddhist temples in Hanoi.

Today, the tradition of Hàng Trống painting is almost lost. New pictures are rarely produced in Hàng Trống anymore because of lack of interest among the younger generations; there remains only one experienced craftsman, Lê Đình Nghiên, who can make Hàng Trống paintings. As a result, authentic Hàng Trống pictures are found only in museums or fine art gallery. Nevertheless, there are several efforts underway to resurrect this genre of traditional art like propagating Hàng Trống paintings in festivals, galleries and transmitting knowledge of making pictures from old craftsmen to young artists.

== See also ==
- Đông Hồ painting
- Kim Hoàng painting
