= Kim Hoàng painting =

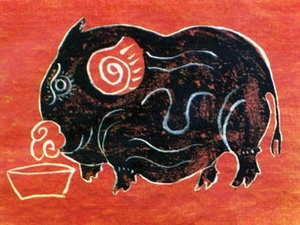
Lợn độc (Pig), one of the surviving examples of Kim Hoàng painting.

Kim Hoàng painting (Vietnamese: Tranh Kim Hoàng) is a genre of Vietnamese woodcut paintings originating from Kim Hoàng village of Hoài Đức, Hanoi, Vietnam. In the past, Kim Hoàng painting was a popular element of the Tết holiday, together with Đông Hồ and Hàng Trống paintings, but this tradition was lost in the middle of the 20th century and today several authentic Kim Hoàng paintings are found only in museums or art galleries. However, the art of making Kim Hoàng painting is still considered a symbol of traditional culture and aesthetic value of Vietnam.

== Themes and making ==
Produced in the countryside as Đông Hồ painting, pictures of Kim Hoàng share many common themes with ones of Đông Hồ such as everyday activities, animals and sprititual signs. The distinct feature of Kim Hoàng painting is several lines of poem written in form of chữ thảo at the left corner of the painting, the content of those lines along with the illustration help emphasize the meaning of the picture. The popular examples of Kim Hoàng painting are Gà độc (Cockerel) and Lợn độc (Pig).

The woodcuts of Kim Hoàng village are more delicate and detailed than ones of Đông Hồ village, they are used to print in sheets of paper which are dyed beforehand with red or yellow colours, the red ones are called giấy hồng điều (scarlet paper) and the yellow ones is giấy vàng tầu (Chinese yellow paper). The colours used in making Kim Hoàng painting are obtained from black Chinese ink and other natural materials such as white gypsum, red vermilion and yellow gardenia. To strengthen the durability of the colours, the craftsmen often mixed colour paints with glue extracted from buffalo skin. Like the production of Hàng Trống painting, Kim Hoàng craftsmen only used the woodblocks to create the black outlines and then drew and coloured details by their own hands. For this reason, pictures of a subject, although outlined by the same woodcut, are slightly different from one to another, thus they become more valuable and attractive to customers.

== History ==
The origin of Kim Hoàng painting was dated back to the 18th century during the reign of the Lê dynasty. The pictures were made in the Kim Hoàng village, now in Hoài Đức (Hanoi), which was one of the few place where folk paintings were made in Vietnam during the dynastic time, along with Hàng Trống, Đông Hồ and Sình village. Kim Hoàng painting was well received in the 19th century but the tradition of making pictures gradually declined and ultimately lost in the middle of the 20th century. One of the main factor that led to the extinction of the manufacture was a flood in 1915 which destroyed almost all original woodblocks of the village. Nowadays, authentic Kim Hoàng pictures are only found in museums and galleries.

== Pig paintings Kim Hoàng typical and popular ==
Pig paintings are known as the unique artwork of the Kim Hoàng painting series. Painting has religious meaning and good luck, so it is very popular when it comes to the new year.

Kim Hoàng Picture of the pig brings a bohemian and natural line with a clever combination of colors and highlights on the red paper. Pig paintings own unique beauty, highly symbolic.

The artisan shows a liberal drawing that makes the image of a more stylized pig with details replaced by a pattern but still retains its inherent soul. The pig's ears disappear instead of spiraling motifs, the definitive strokes of the pen are extremely impressive.

Kim Hoàng Painting is different from other people's paintings in that it is a combination of printing, coloring and skillfully drawing to create a flexible but definitive line. This is a line of folk paintings with Vietnamese cultural beauty that needs to be handed down and preserved. Hopefully, the information shared from the article will help you no longer be surprised when it comes to folk paintings Kim Hoàng.

== See also ==
- Đông Hồ painting
- Hàng Trống painting
