= Cẩm Giàng, Thái Nguyên =

Coordinates: 21°08′N 105°58′E

Cẩm Giàng
- Rural commune and village
- Interactive map of Cẩm Giàng
- Country: Vietnam
- Province: Thái Nguyên
- Time zone: UTC+07:00 (Indochina Time)

Cẩm Giàng is a rural commune (xã) and village in Thái Nguyên Province, in Vietnam.

The entire natural area and population of Quân Hà Commune, Nguyên Phúc Commune, Mỹ Thanh Commune, and Cẩm Giàng Commune are rearranged to form a new commune named Cẩm Giàng Commune.
