= Bắc Ninh =

Centrally-governed city of Vietnam

- Centrally-governed city
- Thành phố Bắc Ninh 城庯北寧
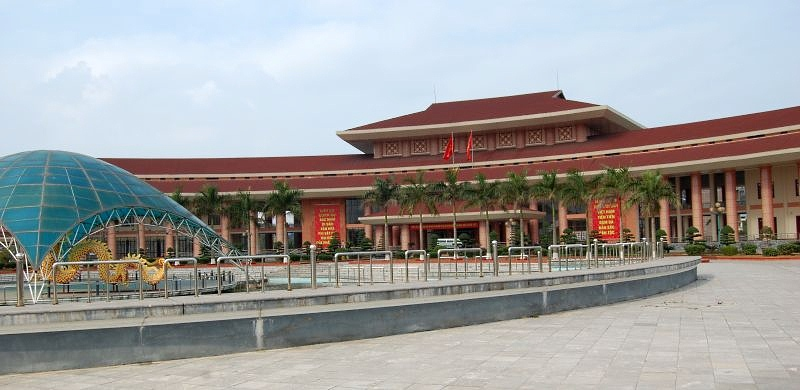
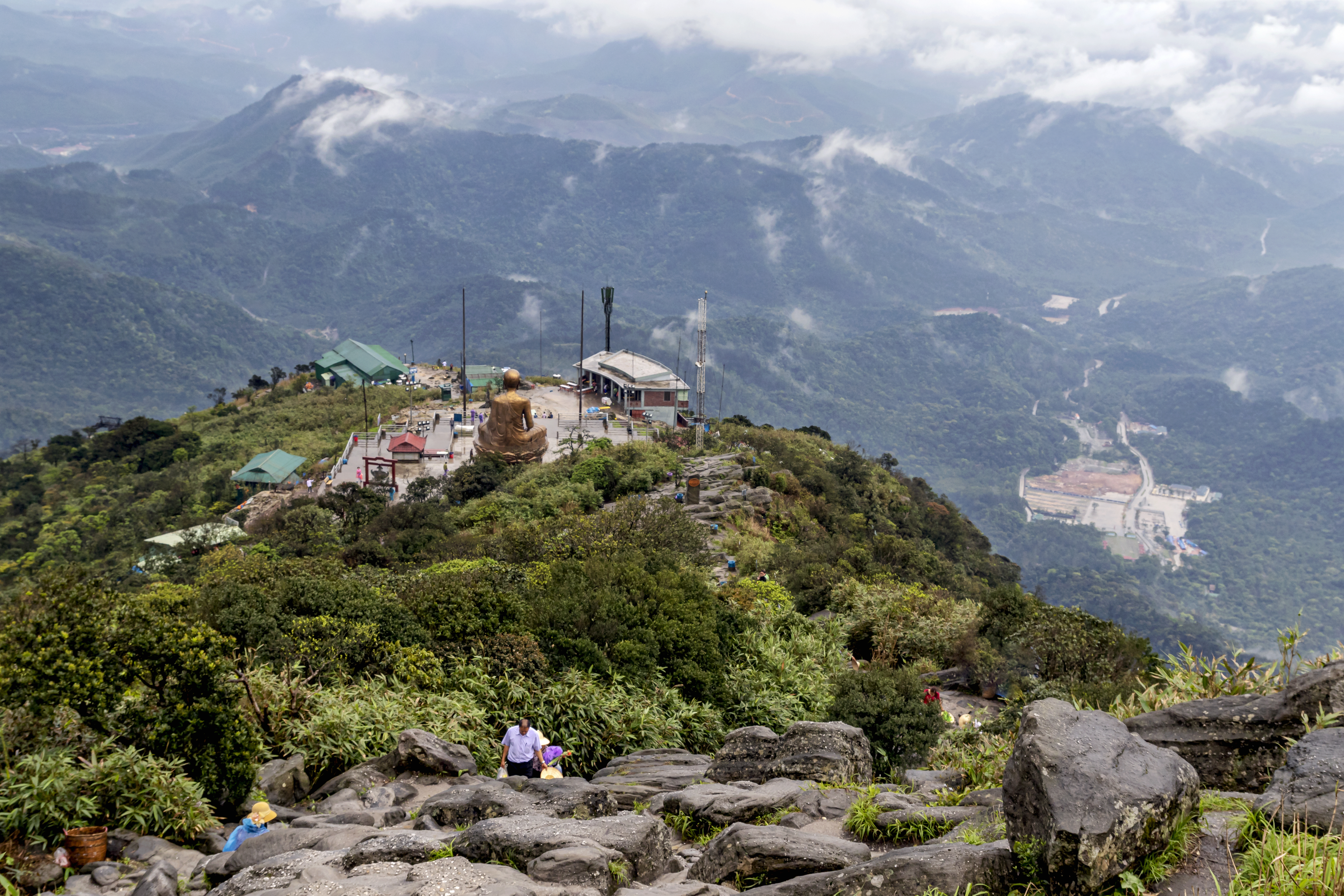
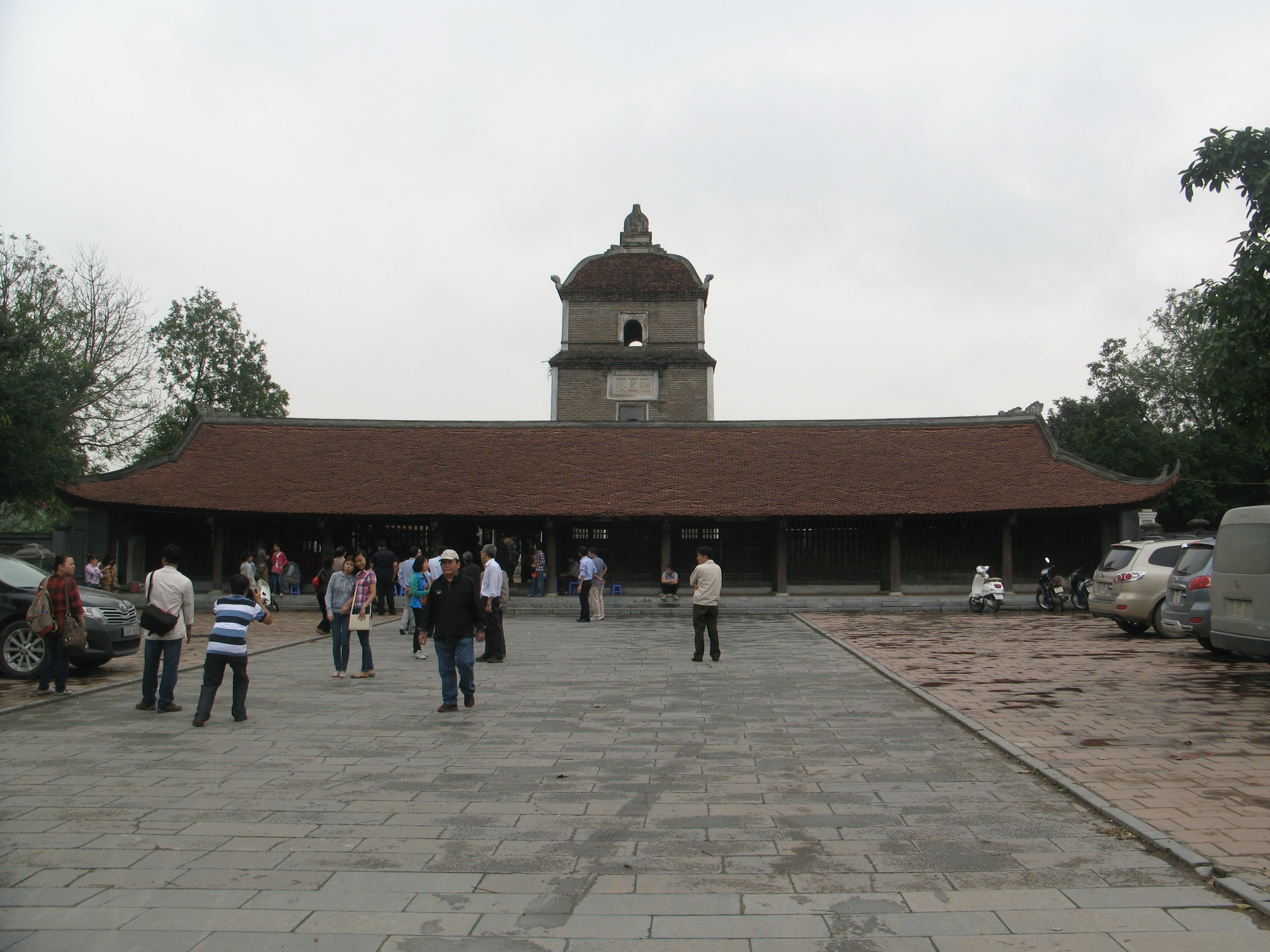
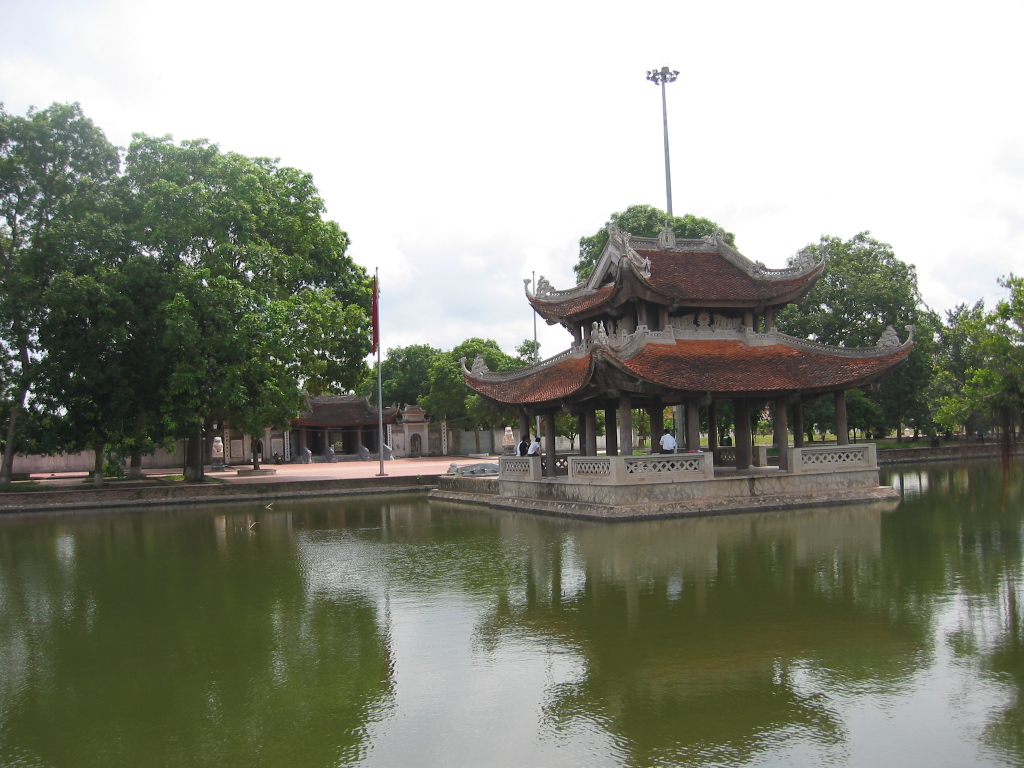
- Clockwise from top left: Kinh Bac Cultural Center; Dâu Temple; Lý Bát Đế Temple; Yen Tu Mountain
- Nickname: The land of Quan Ho folk songs
- Location of Bắc Ninh within Vietnam.
- Interactive map of Bắc Ninh
- Coordinates: 21°5′N 106°10′E
- Country: Vietnam
- Region: Red River Delta
- Capital: Bắc Giang ward
- Subdivision: 45 wards, 54 communes

Government
  - Type: Centrally-governed city
  - Body: Bắc Ninh city People's Council
  - Party Secretary: Nguyễn Hồng Thái
  - Chairman of People's Council: Nguyễn Việt Oanh
  - Chairman of People's Committee: Phạm Hoàng Sơn

Area
  - Total: 4,718.6 km^{2} (1,821.9 sq mi)

Population (2025)
  - Total: 3,619,433
  - Density: 767.06/km^{2} (1,986.7/sq mi)

Ethnic groups
  - Kinh: 94.46%
  - Tày: 1.79%
  - Others: 3.75%

GDP
  - Centrally- governed city: VND 161.708 trillion US$ 7.024 billion
- Time zone: UTC+7 (ICT)
- Area codes: 222
- ISO 3166 code: VN-56
- Vehicle registration: 98, 99
- HDI (2022): ▲0.784 (6th)
- Website: Bacninh.gov.vn

Bắc Ninh (Vietnamese pronunciation: [ɓǎk nīŋ̟]) is a centrally-governed city in Vietnam, located in the Red River Delta region. It borders Hanoi, Hải Phòng, Quảng Ninh cities, Hưng Yên province, Lạng Sơn province, and Thái Nguyên province. The city covers an area of 4,718.60 km^{2} (1,821.86 mi^{2}) and as of 2025 it has a population of 3,619,433.

Bắc Ninh is known for Quan họ folk music. Quan họ was recognized as an Intangible Cultural Heritage by the UNESCO in 2009. The city has a Human Development Index of 0.779 (high), ranking seventh among all municipalities and provinces of Vietnam. It was ranked eighth in Gross Regional Domestic Product (GRDP) and third in per capita GRDP among Vietnamese administrative units. The GRDP reached 248.376 trillion Vietnamese Đồng (equivalent to over 10.8 billion USD), with a per capita GRDP of 7,250 USD (equivalent to 167 million Đồng), and a GRDP growth rate of 7.39% in 2022.

== Climate ==
Bắc Ninh features a warm humid subtropical climate (Köppen Cwa). It is located in a tropical monsoon region. The annual average temperature is 24 °C. The highest is 30 °C in July; the lowest is 6 °C in January. The city experiences the typical climate of northern Vietnam, where summers are hot and humid, and winters are, by national standards, relatively cold and dry. Summers, lasting from May to September, are hot and humid, receiving the majority of the annual 1,680 millimetres (66.1 in) of rainfall. The winters, lasting from November to March, are relatively mild, dry (in the first half) or humid (in the second half), while spring (April) can bring light rains. Autumn (October) is the best time of the year in terms of weather. The average annual sunshine is 1,530-1,776 hours, while the relative humidity is 79%.

Climate data for Bắc Ninh
Month	Jan	Feb	Mar	Apr	May	Jun	Jul	Aug	Sep	Oct	Nov	Dec	Year
Mean daily maximum °C (°F)	19.3 (66.7)	21.7 (71.1)	24.7 (76.5)	28.8 (83.8)	30.9 (87.6)	32.5 (90.5)	32.3 (90.1)	31.6 (88.9)	30.6 (87.1)	28.6 (83.5)	25.1 (77.2)	20.8 (69.4)	27.2 (81.0)
Daily mean °C (°F)	16.1 (61.0)	18.2 (64.8)	21 (70)	24.9 (76.8)	27.7 (81.9)	28.8 (83.8)	28.7 (83.7)	27.9 (82.2)	26.8 (80.2)	24.7 (76.5)	21.2 (70.2)	17.1 (62.8)	23.6 (74.5)
Mean daily minimum °C (°F)	12.8 (55.0)	14.9 (58.8)	17.8 (64.0)	21.7 (71.1)	24.2 (75.6)	25.9 (78.6)	26 (79)	25.3 (77.5)	24 (75)	21.5 (70.7)	17.7 (63.9)	13.4 (56.1)	20.4 (68.8)
Average rainfall mm (inches)	44 (1.7)	37 (1.5)	62 (2.4)	101 (4.0)	264 (10.4)	294 (11.6)	325 (12.8)	355 (14.0)	230 (9.1)	115 (4.5)	63 (2.5)	36 (1.4)	1,926 (75.9)
Average relative humidity (%)	71	74	77	78	79	80	81	85	81	75	72	68	77
Source: climate-data.org

== Demography ==
Historical population
Year	Population
1995	916,000
1996	925,300
1997	931,700
1998	937,600
1999	943,000
2000	950,600
2001	958,900
2002	967,600
2003	975,300
2004	983,200
2005	991,100
2006	999,800
2007	1,009,400
2008	1,018,100
2009	1,026,500
2010	1,041,200
2011	1,063,400
2012	1,085,800
2013	1,108,200
2014	1,131,200
2015	1,154,750
2016	1,178,600
2017	1,215,200
2018	1,247,500
2019	1,378,600
2020	1,419,130
2021	1,462,950
2022	1,488,200
2023	1,517,400
2024	1,543,529

== Economy ==
In 2015, the Gross Regional Domestic Product (GRDP) increased 8.7% compared with 2014. Agro-forestry-fishery accounted for 5.3%, industry and construction for 75.6% and service 19.1%. Industrial production value was estimated at VND 610 trillion, up 9.1%. The total retail sale of goods and consumer service revenue reached over VND 39.7 trillion, up 15.4%, the total export turnover of goods was estimated at US$23.2 billion, up 6.4%, the total state budget revenue in the province was estimated at VND 14,500 billion, up 14.3%.

== Culture ==
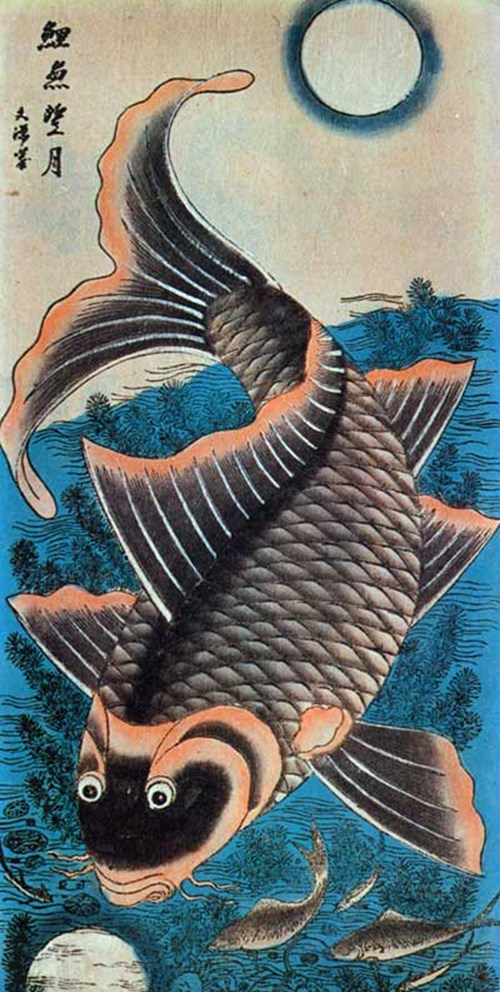
Dong Ho painting of the Carp looks the Moon.

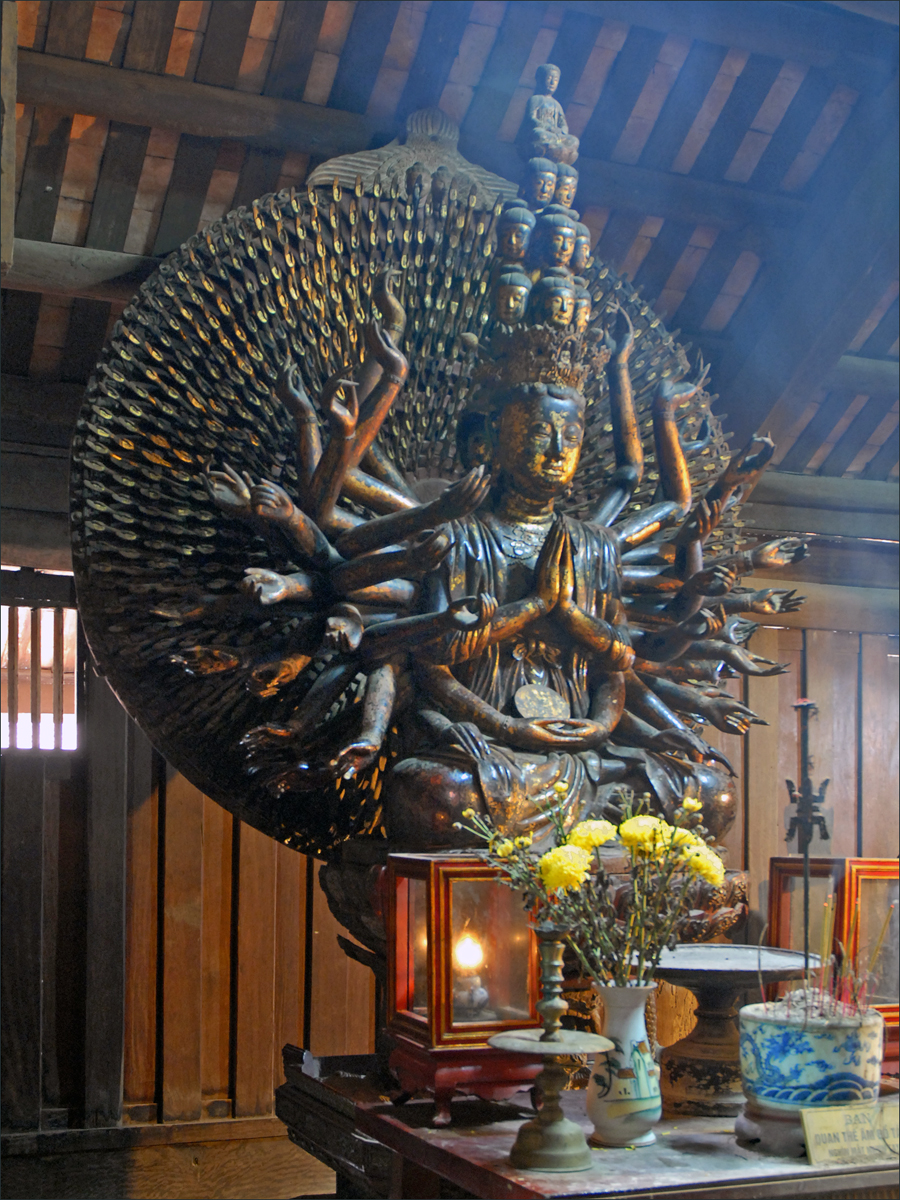
Statue of Avalokiteshvara Bodhisattva at Ninh Phúc Pagoda in crimson and gilded wood, Revival Lê Dynasty, autumn of 1656.

Bắc Ninh was the homeland of eight Kings of the Lý Dynasty. The Đô Temple is where 8 kings of the Lý Dynasty are worshipped.

The village of Đông Hồ is known as the center of production of traditional Vietnamese woodblock prints (Đông Hồ painting), which are sold throughout Vietnam in time for the Lunar New Year (Tết) celebrations.

== International relations ==
- Angola

The leader expressed his wish to share the province's experience with Angola in investment promotion, contributing to fostering the friendship between the two peoples. They signed a memorandum of understanding on cooperation in forestry exploitation and processing, and the supply of construction workers in oil and gas to the African country.
