= Đông Hồ painting =

Vietnamese painting style

Craft of making Đông Hồ Folk woodblock printings
- UNESCO Intangible Cultural Heritage
- Country: Vietnam
- Reference: 01737
- Region: Asia and the Pacific

Inscription history
- Inscription: 2025 (20th session)
- List: Need of Urgent Safeguarding

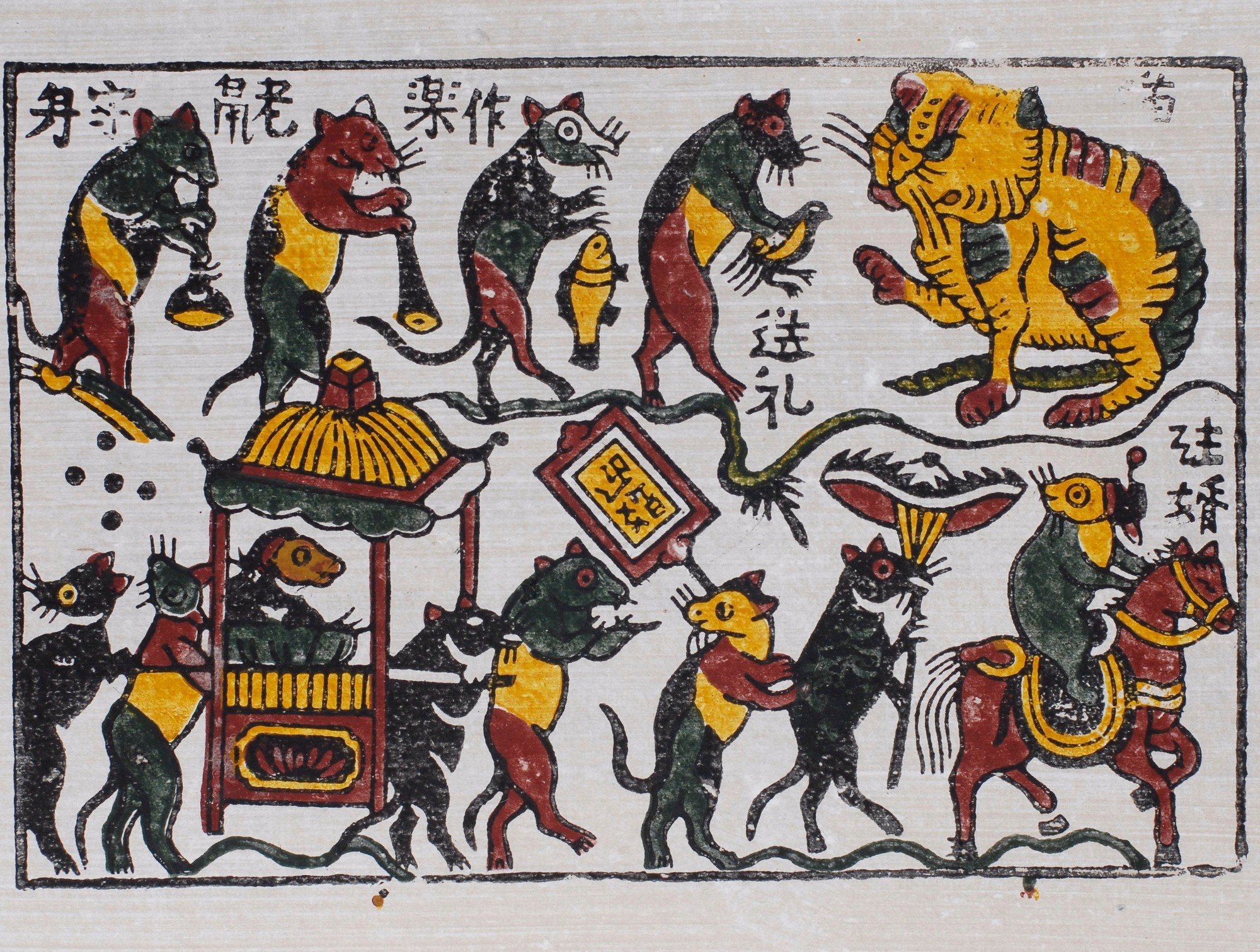
Đám cưới chuột (Rat's wedding), a popular example of Đông Hồ painting

Ðông Hồ painting (Vietnamese: Tranh Đông Hồ or Tranh làng Hồ), full name Đông Hồ folk woodcut painting (Tranh khắc gỗ dân gian Đông Hồ) is a line of Vietnamese folk painting originating in Đông Hồ village (Song Hồ commune, Thuận Thành District, Bắc Ninh Province).

With the consent of the Prime Minister, the Ministry of Culture, in collaboration with the Provincial People's Committee of Bắc Ninh and the specialized agencies conducting research, have set records for Đông Hồ folk paintings to be submitted to UNESCO for the recognition of intangible cultural heritage.

== Themes ==
Đông Hồ painting is considered a fine reflection of traditional aesthetic value, social philosophies, and humanitarian desires. The traditional themes of Đông Hồ painting are good luck signs, historical figures, folk allegories, popular stories, and social commentaries. Elements of everyday life are well integrated in Đông Hồ paintings to express the thoughts and wishes of people. Following is a table of main themes in Đông Hồ paintings and exemplary pictures of each theme:

Theme	Pictures
Spirit	Ngũ sự, 12 signs of Vietnamese zodiac
Good luck wishes	Lợn đàn (corpulent pig with suckling piglets), Gà đàn (hen surrounded by chickens), Cá chép (carp)
Mythical and historical figures	Bà Triệu, Hai Bà Trưng, Quang Trung, Thánh Gióng
Folk allegories and popular stories	Truyện Kiều, Thạch Sanh, Thầy đồ Cóc (Confucian scholar in form of a toad), Đám cưới chuột (Rat's wedding)
Social activities and commentaries	Đánh ghen (scene of jealousy), Hứng dừa (scene of catching coconuts), Đấu vật (scene of wrestling), Chăn trâu thổi sáo (boy sitting on a buffalo and playing the flute)

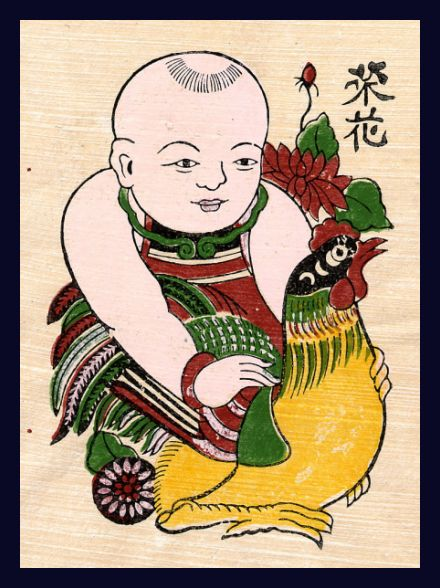
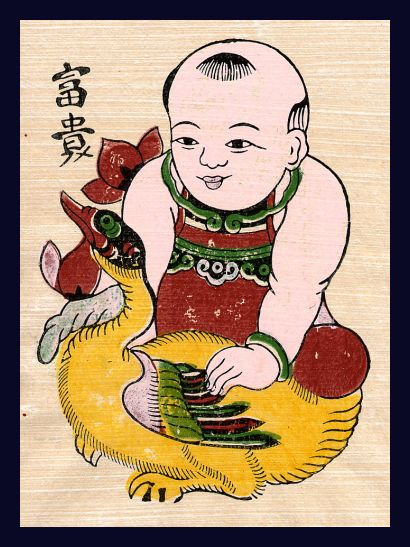
The couplet Vinh hoa (eminence) and Phú quý (prosperity and honour)

Because Đông Hồ paintings are mainly bought and displayed on the occasion of Tết Nguyên Đán (Vietnamese New Year), contents are often humorous and optimistic with bright and powerful colours such as red, yellow, and white. The most popular and best-selling paintings are Lợn đàn, Gà đàn, and Chăn trâu thổi sáo, which represent the wish for prosperity, happiness and luck in the New Year. Together with the illustration, a Đông Hồ painting also has some chữ Hán to literally describe the meaning. Sometimes, Đông Hồ paintings are shown in couplet or quartet to fully express the signification of the set, for example, the Vinh Hoa (eminence) and the Phú quý (prosperity and honour) should be taken in a couple. In addition, Đông Hồ paintings are a medium to express the social concern of craftsmen through subtle social, political, and cultural criticism. For example, before World War I, Đông Hồ villagers produced a set of four prints entitled Văn Minh tiến bộ (The Progress of Civilization) in which the Westernization of the Vietnamese society was delicately criticized through the satirical portrayal of contemporary Vietnamese people dressing and behaving like French people. Some Đông Hồ paintings became famous for their interesting themes like the picture Đám cưới chuột (Rat's wedding) which features a wedding march of rats with the rat bride and groom and other rat guests delivering gifts to a big cat in hope that the cat will leave the happy couple alone.

== Gallery ==
Below are some examples:

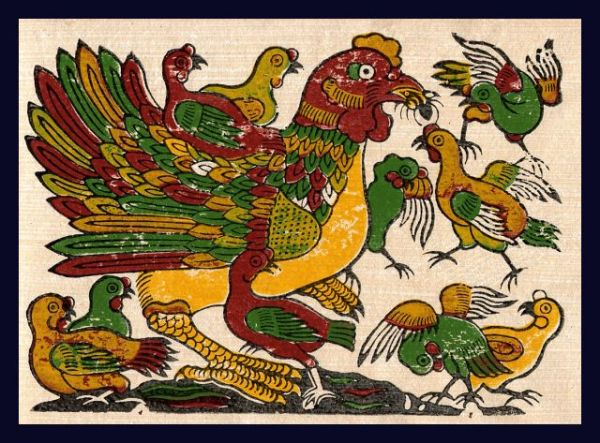
Good luck wish: Gà đàn (Chicken)

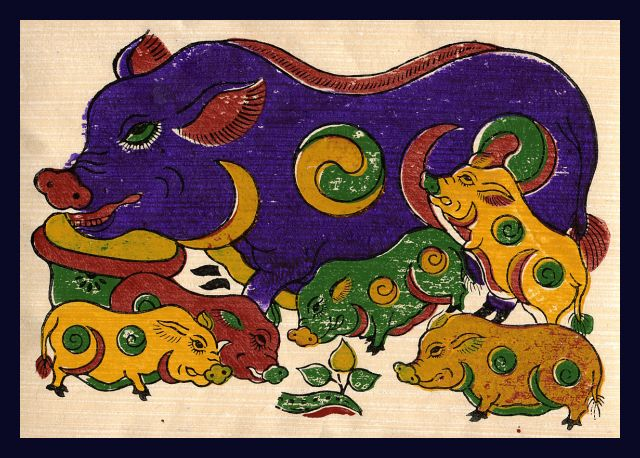
Good luck wish: Lợn âm dương (Yin-yang pig)

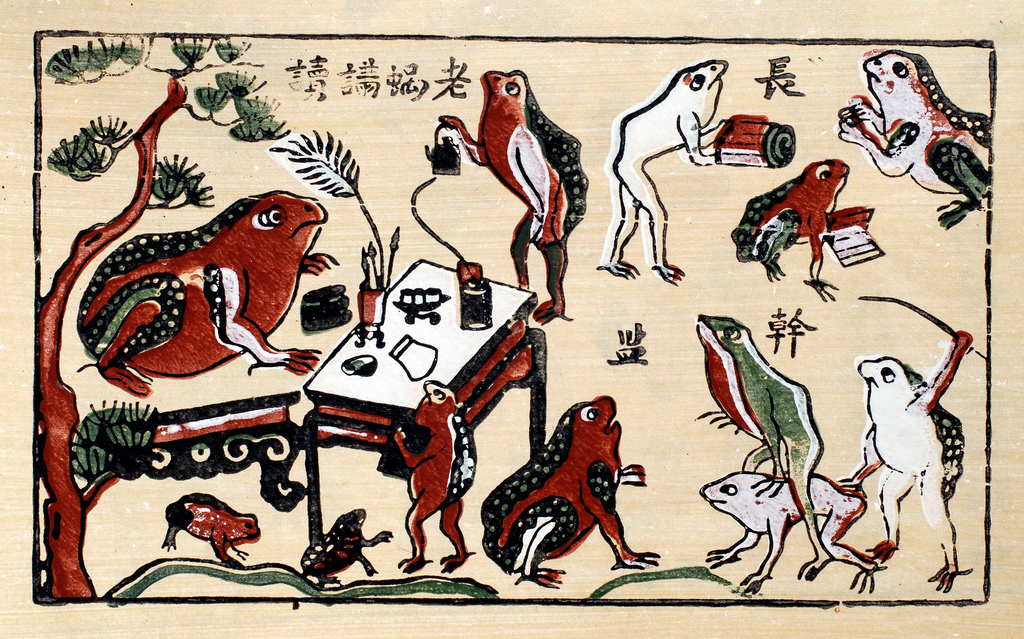
Folk allegory: Thầy đồ Cóc (Frog teacher)

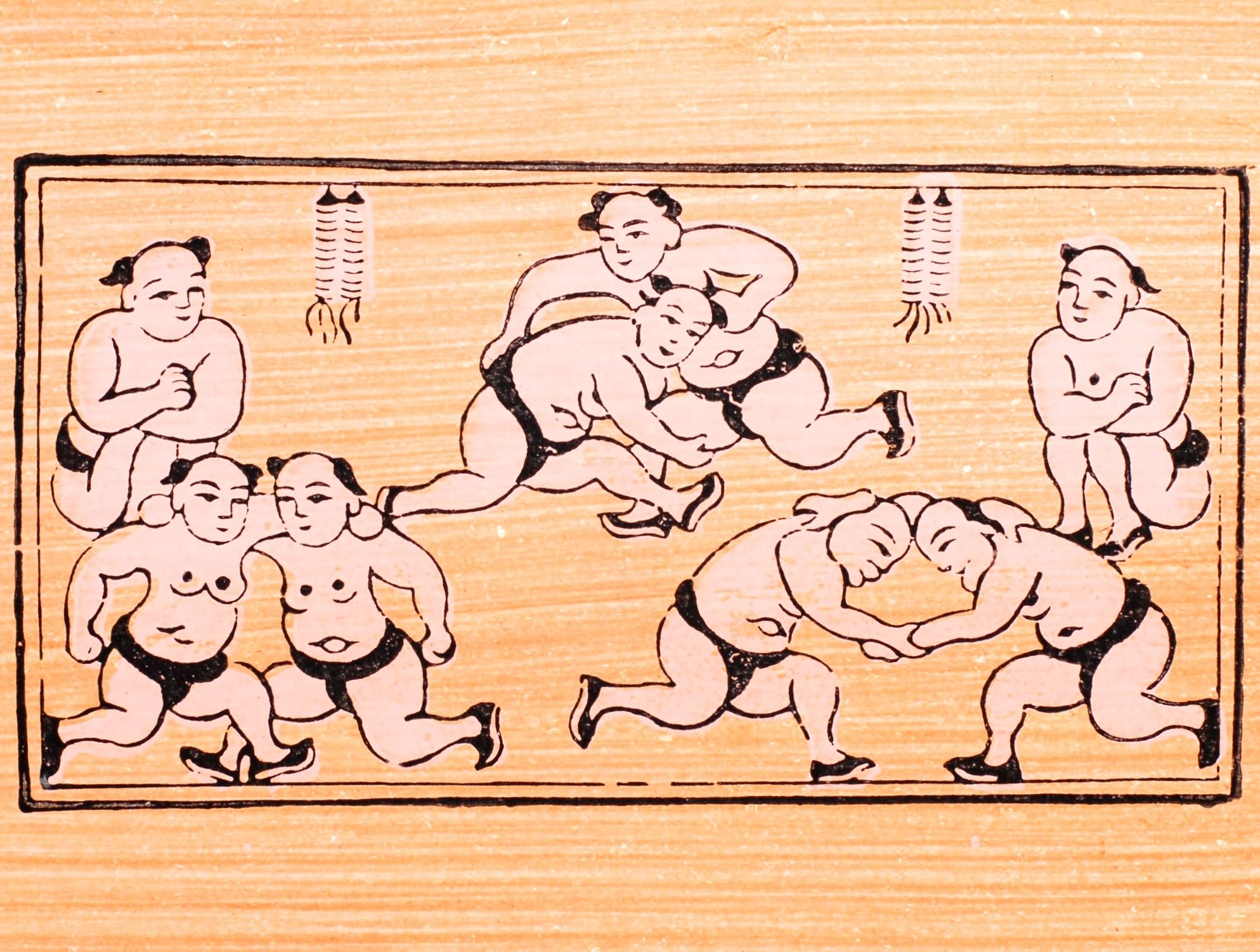
Everyday activities: Đấu vật (Wrestling)

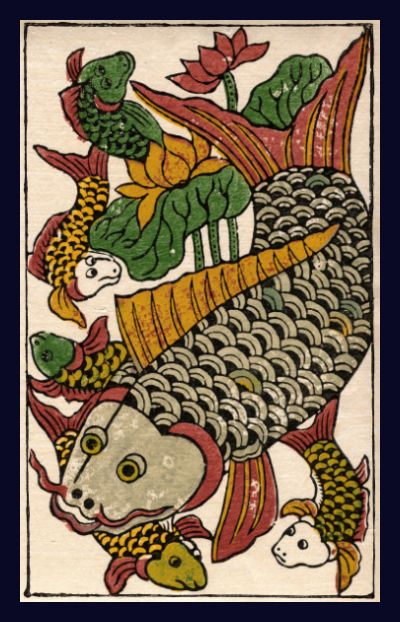
Good luck wish: Cá chép (Carp)

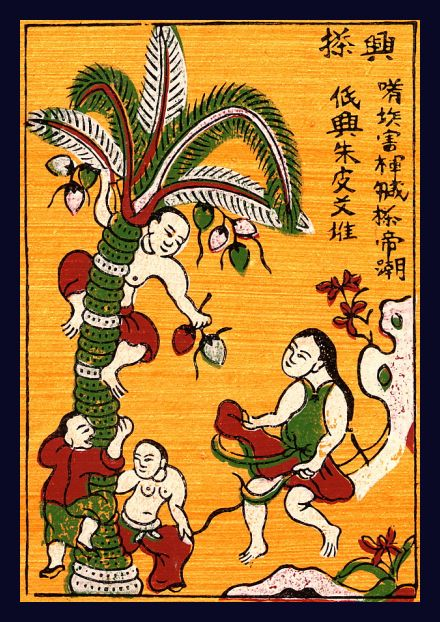
Social commentary: Hái dừa (Picking coconut)

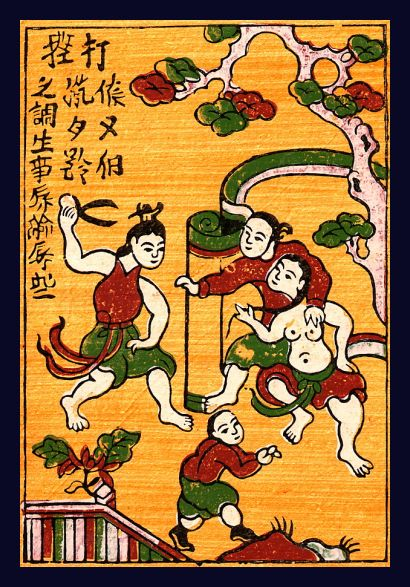
Social commentary: Đánh ghen (Jealousy scene)

== Techniques ==
Colour	Origin
Black	Burnt bamboo leaves
Green	Cajuput leaves
Blue	Verdigris
Amber	Turpentine
Red	Powder of red gravels
Yellow	Senna flowers
White	Powder of egg shells

Đông Hồ painting is the exclusive product of the Đông Hồ village, a craft village located on the left bank of the Đuống River in Bắc Ninh Province, about 35 km from Hanoi. Craftsmen in the village often produce their own raw materials for the making such as điệp paper and natural colours.

In printing pictures, Đông Hồ craftsmen use a special type of paper named giấy điệp. The paper is obtained in almost the same way as dó paper. The bark of dó tree, which normally is grown in Tuyên Quang Province, is soaked in water for months, then mixed with powders of seashells (sò điệp), which is the origin of the paper's name, and glutinous rice to make sheets of paper. Due to the elements of seashell and glutinous rice, điệp paper possesses an exotic sparkling hard background and is able to conserve the durability of colours. The colours of paint using in printing are refined from various kinds of natural materials which are easily found in Vietnam. For instance, the red colour is taken from red gravel in Thiên Thai Mountain, while the black comes from charcoal of burned bamboo leaves. In that way, a Đông Hồ painting can keep its colours for a long time.

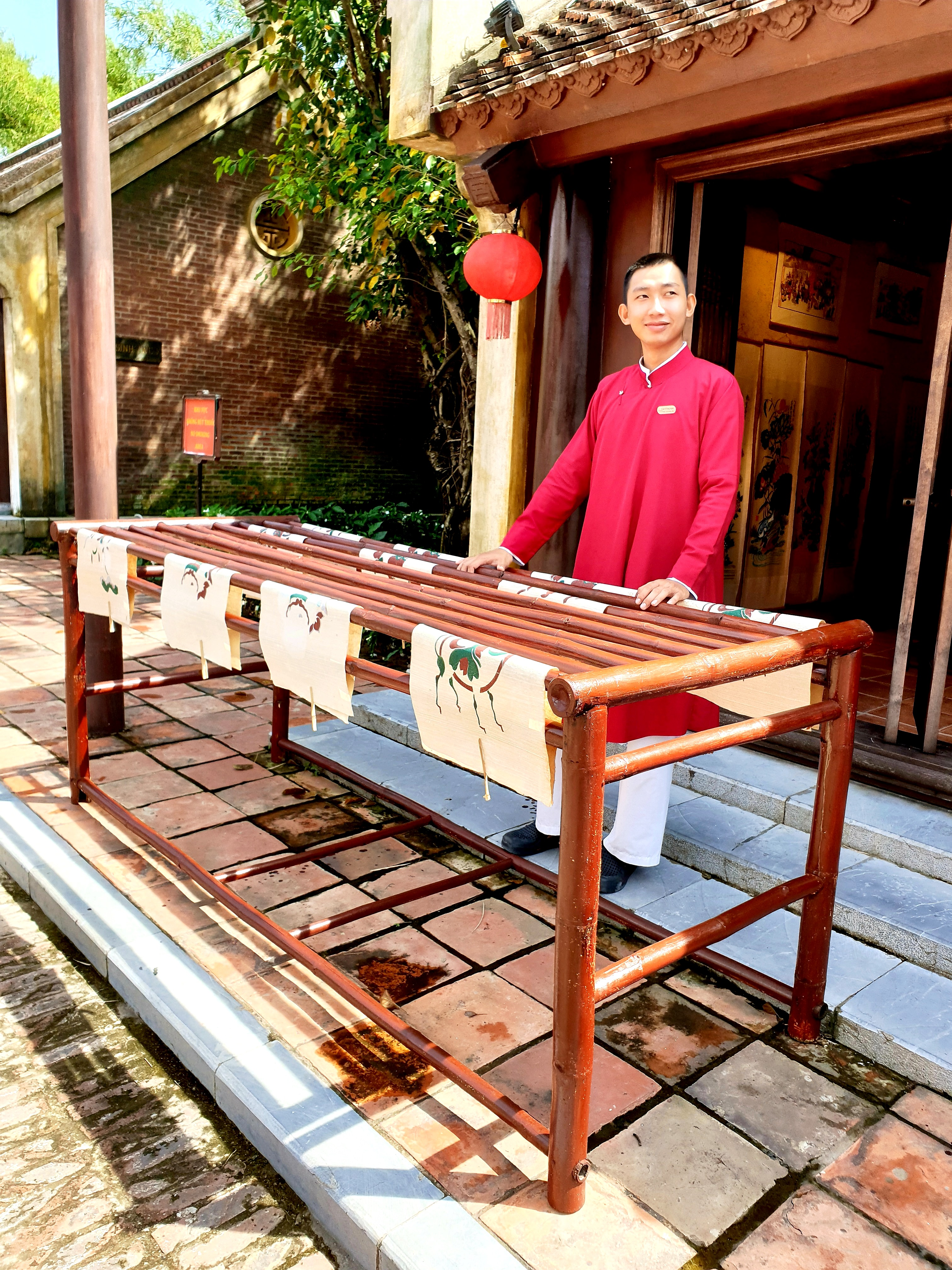
Drying Đông Hồ painting in Thăng Long Cổ Trấn, Phú Quốc

The last stage of making a Đông Hồ painting is printing, the woodblock is applied with paint and pressed on a sheet of paper like a stamp. The process is repeated with different colours until the craftsman is satisfied with the painting. One woodcut is for outline and several others are for each colour printed, and they are carefully engraved by hand so the woodcuts can be preserved through generations. The finished picture is covered with a layer of rice paste (hồ nếp) to strengthen the durability of its illustration and colours and afterwards dried under the sun. In the past, to prepare for Tết, craftsmen had to begin the process of making these paintings six or seven months ahead.

== History ==
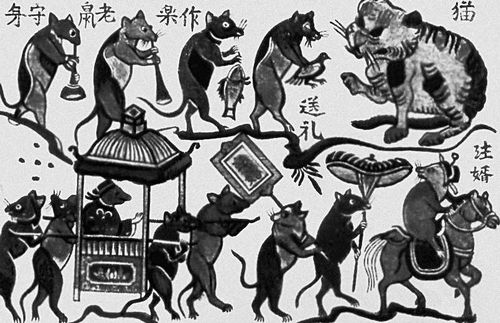
The black-and-white Đám cưới chuột

According to the villagers, the making of tranh Đông Hồ painting was dated back to the 11th century during the reign of the Lý dynasty, while researchers propose that craftsmen began to print pictures in Đông Hồ village during the rule of Lê Kính Tông (1600–1619) of the Lê dynasty. In the dynastic time, Đông Hồ village is one of the few places which had the tradition of making folk paintings, along with Hàng Trống, Kim Hoàng, and Sình village. Originally, Đông Hồ paintings were made only with black-and-white prints of woodcuts, but from the 15th century, different colours were introduced by craftsmen in the village. As a village specialized in making woodcuts and paintings, almost all Đông Hồ villagers were involved in the manufacturing of paintings from carving the woodblocks, producing điệp papers, obtaining natural colours to creating new themes, and printing.

Traditionally, Đông Hồ painting was an essential element in every Vietnamese family during the Tết holiday. The colourful tones and optimistic content of the images livened up the house and the picture was considered a good luck sign for the family in the New Year, thus Đông Hồ paintings had other names like Tết paintings (tranh Tết) or spring paintings (tranh xuân). In 1945, there were 17 local families in Đông Hồ village were making pictures. However, the tradition faded rapidly under the dominance of modern life in Vietnam, and Đông Hồ pictures gradually disappeared in Vietnamese families during the Tết holiday. The principal buyers of Đông Hồ paintings today are tourists who are interested in traditional arts. Therefore, the villagers can no longer make a living based on this production. Đông Hồ painting also has to face the menace from fake pictures which are mass-produced by printing machines. As a result, only several households in the village still make pictures, while many others have switched to producing joss paper and votive paper objects (vàng mã).

Several efforts have been made to preserve this traditional art form. A "Đông Hồ Painting Center" was established in 2008 by Nguyễn Đăng Chế, one of the few remaining experienced craftsmen of the village. Some artists have also tried to adapt the elements of Đông Hồ painting in modern fine art such as using the technique of woodcut printing like Đông Hồ craftsmen or drawing with the inspiration from Đông Hồ pictures. To honour this traditional art and propagate the beauty of Đông Hồ painting, the Ministry of Post and Telecommunications of Vietnam issued in 2007 a set of commemorative stamps with the artwork in the style of traditional Đông Hồ paintings such as Lợn đàn or Lợn Âm Dương.

In March 2020, Việt Nam submitted the dossier on Đông Hồ folk paintings to UNESCO for inclusion in the list of intangible cultural heritages in need of urgent safeguarding.

== Đông Hồ painting classification ==
1. Spiritual paintings, including: Ministry of Fortune, Five things, Horoscopes - Tran Trach, Vu Dinh - Thien Dat, ....
2. Historical paintings, including: Hai Ba Trung, Phu Dong Thien Vuong, Dinh Tien Hoang, Ba Trieu, Quang Trung, Ngo Quyen, Tran Hung Dao ,, ...
3. Comics, including: Thach Sanh, Truyen Kieu, Tay Du Ky, Luc Luc Tien, ...
4. Congratulation paintings include: Tien Tai - Tien Loc, Vinh Hoa - Phu Quy - Nhan Nghia - Le Tri, Vinh Quy Bai Bai, Nghinh Xuan, Chickens, Yin and Yang Pigs, Ong To - Ba Nguyet, Ga Thu Hung, ...
5. Living pictures, including: Flute buffalo flute, jealous fight, farmer, coconut collector, mouse wedding, buffalo kite flying,….

== Đông Hồ painting village ==
Đông Hồ painting village is famous for its folk paintings. Year-round, many foreign tourists visit to buy souvenirs. A painting fair is held annually on the Tết holiday in the communal house in the village.

== See also ==
- Hàng Trống painting
- Kim Hoàng painting
