= NHU =

NHU, Nhu or Như may refer to

== People ==
- Ngô Đình Nhu (1910–1963), chief political advisor to his brother, Ngô Đình Diệm, president of South Vietnam
- Madame Nhu (1924–2011), wife to Ngô Đình Nhu, born Trần Lệ Xuân
- Như Loan (born 1980), Vietnamese singer, born Lê Thị Như Loan
- Như Quỳnh (actress) (born 1954), Vietnamese actress, born Nguyễn Như Quỳnh
- Như Quỳnh (singer) (born 1970), Vietnamese singer, born Lê Lâm Quỳnh Như

== Places ==
- Nanhua University (founded 1996, Chinese: 南華大學), Taiwanese university
- Như Cố, commune and village in Bắc Kạn Province, northern Vietnam
- Như Thanh District, district of Thanh Hóa Province, central Vietnam
- Như Xuân District, district of Thanh Hóa Province, central Vietnam

== Other ==
- BBC Natural History Unit, factual programming department of the BBC
- Cuong Nhu (founded 1965, Vietnamese: Cương Nhu), martial arts school founded by Ngô Đồng
