= Tân Dân (disambiguation) =

Tân Dân may refer to:

- Tân Dân, a ward of Thanh Hóa province
- Tân Dân, Bac Giang, a former commune of Vietnam
- Tân Dân, Ca Mau, a former commune of Vietnam
- Tân Dân Publishing House, a pre-1945 Vietnamese publisher
