= Night, Again =

Anthology of Vietnamese fiction

Night, Again is an anthology of contemporary Vietnamese fiction, edited by Linh Dinh.

Published in 1996 by Seven Stories Press, then reissued in 2006 with two new stories, Night, Again features key authors emerging from the liberalization of Đổi Mới in the 1980s, as well as major writers living overseas.

The stories include:

"Sleeping on Earth" by Nguyễn Thị Ấm, translated by Phan Huy Đường and Nina McPherson
"A Marker on the Side of the Boat" by Bảo Ninh, translated by Linh Dinh
"Reflections of Spring" by Dương Thu Hương, translated by Nguyễn Nguyệt Cầm and Linh Dinh
"Without a King" by Nguyễn Huy Thiệp, translated by Linh Dinh
"The River's Curse" by Trần Ngọc Tuấn, translated by Linh Dinh
"Scenes from an Alley" by Lê Minh Khuê, translated by Bắc Hoài Trân and Nina Sachs
"The Way Station" by Đỗ Phước Tiến, translated by Phan Huy Đường and Nina McPherson
"A Stagnant Water Place" by Thế Giang, translated by Cường Nguyễn
"Nine Down Makes Ten" by Phạm Thị Hoài, translated by Peter Zinoman
"Men, Women and Flowers" by Đức Ban, translated by Linh Dinh
"In the Recovery Room" by Mai Kim Ngọc, translated by Nguyễn Quí Đức
"Gunboat on the Yangtze" by Trần Vũ, translated by Phan Huy Đường and Nina McPherson
"The Pre-War Atmosphere" by Đỗ Kh., translated by Linh Dinh
"The Ferry Stop in the Country" by Nguyễn Minh Châu, translated by Linh Dinh

== from the Introduction ==
III

The upheavals in the Communist world in the mid-1980s had profound repercussions in Vietnam. After the 1986 Party congress, the term Đổi Mới—or "Renovation", the Vietnamese version of glasnost, entered the vernacular. In literature, the new era was announced by Secretary General Nguyễn Văn Linh at a gathering of writers in October 1987. Admitting that the Party had been "less than democratic [in the past], and often dogmatic and brutal" in its treatment of writers. Linh promised to "unbind" them from that point on: "Speak the truth... No matter what happens, Comrades, don't curb your pen."

The Party was only conceding to what was already happening. The Đổi Mới literature can be traced to the appearances of novels by Ma Văn Kháng, Lê Lựu and Dương Thu Hương in 1985, 1986, 1987, respectively, with essays by the prominent critic Hoàng Ngọc Hiến and the writer-critic Nguyễn Minh Châu serving as catalysts. All had impeccable political pedigrees: Kháng, Lựu, Hương and Châu were Party members who had served in the war (Châu retired as a colonel); Hiến is the director of the Nguyễn Du writing school, originally modeled after the Gorky school in Moscow to develop Socialist writers.

Although the situation had been volatile, with books still being banned, editors fired and authors silenced, the government's tactics are not nearly as Draconian as in the past. In 1958, Nguyễn Hữu Đang, Thụy An and Trần Thiếu Bảo were slapped with 15-year sentences in kangaroo courts for their involvements in the Nhân Văn Giai Phẩm movement.

IV

The wide circulation of Dương Thu Hương's first novel, Bên kia bờ ảo vọng [The Other Side Of Illusion] (1987), established her as a vanguard for Đổi Mới literature. Though her roots are in Socialist Realism, Hương has broken from the movement's sanctioned subjects by listing Party members among her targets of criticism. Later, with the appearance of Những thiên đường mù [Paradise Of The Blind] (1988) and Tiểu thuyềt vô đề [Novel without a Name] (1994) in foreign translations, plus her increasing outspokenness and seven-month imprisonment in 1991, Hương became Vietnam's most visible writer and dissident. Politics notwithstanding, her gift as a writer is as a purveyor of the quotidian. In the word of one critic: "She is unmatched in her ability to capture the small, telling details of everyday life."

Huong's first book, a volume of stories called Chân dung người hàng xóm [Portrait of a Neighbor] (1985), revealed both her strengths and weaknesses. In the story "Thợ làm móng tay" ["The Manicurist"], fine descriptive passages are perverted by a heavy-handed political subtext. Its bias can be traced to the war, in which both North and South had demonized the other:

Two cousins, separated for 21 years by the civil war, met again when the narrator, a member of the victorious army, arrived in Saigon in 1975. She found Sang, once "a fit, alert child, with a ruddy complexion", who had vowed to take revenge on the French for killing his father, turned into a pale, listless man obsequiously painting women's toe nails. Sang lived with a busty wife in "a sort of hovel" next to an open sewer, where they bickered endlessly. As a mascot for the decadent South, Sang's two solaces were his electric guitar and prostitution. A circus act in the zoo, featuring a midget with two monkeys, provided the narrator with an apt analogy to ram the author's point home: "Out there [in the North], we do not debase ourselves like that, no matter how much money we can make."

A story in the same volume, "Hồi quang của mùa xuân" ["Reflections of Spring"], included in this anthology, showcases Hương's literary gifts sans soap box. As her vision matured, Huong's technique permutated seamlessly from Socialist Realism to Social Realism. Other authors—most notably the acerbic, funny, and occasionally misanthropic Lê Minh Khuê—join her as writers of conscience in debunking the Socialist utopia. In place of what the historian Peter Zinoman termed "a canned cheeriness... central to the 'moral building' function of the revolutionary writers" are bleak portraits of a backward, rundown and corrupt society. Indignant and with an agenda, their goals are not the same as those who, while not eschewing polemics altogether, busy themselves with words and the intangibles of living.

V

Unfettered by the exigencies of war and politics, many writers are plumbing their own subjectivity and reinventing the multifaceted self. No "cultural fighters", the only vindication they need is to write well. Phạm Thi Hoài declared: "When a writer publishes a good piece of work, he is contributing to changing society. His intention is not to lunge noisily forward to change society, but if the piece is good, one way or another it has already served its social function." In the works of Hoài, Đỗ Phước Tiến, Nguyễn Huy Thiệp, among others, complex events and emotions are rendered in language both suggestive and opaque. Totalitarian, dogmatic truth is replaced by playful indeterminacy. In one story of Thiệp ["Lửa vàng", "Fired Gold"], the reader is offered a choice of three endings. In an addendum to another ["Cún"], a scholar friend of the narrator refutes the story proper with a photograph, and hectors the narrator/author to stick to the "principles of realism". In many of Phạm Thi Hoài's stories, unusual phrasings and diction betrays language as mere artifice.

Educated at the University of Humboldt and a translator of Kafka, Hoài, a major player in Đổi Mới literature, now lives in Berlin. Other important writers have emigrated or spent significant time overseas. Dương Thu Hương lived in Russia, and the protagonist of her most successful novel, Những thiên đường mù [Paradise of the Blind], is a Vietnamese "guest worker" in the former Soviet Union. The gifted and highly touted Trần Vũ escaped Vietnam by boat at the age of 16 and was raised as an orphan in France. Published in California, Vũ's fiction, populated mostly by Vietnamese characters, living inside or outside of Vietnam, alternates between a crisp, no-nonsense prose and a perversely-wrought archaism, extending the language in contrary directions.

Although it may be invigorated by foreign influences, the soul of any literature is in its relationship to the vernacular. Often overlooked in the buzz surrounding Nguyễn Huy Thiệp—Vietnam's most influential writer—is his exceptional ear for the language. Thiệp's sophisticated yet earthy fiction is enlivened by many memorable phrases culled from ordinary speech. A teacher in remote Sơn La province for 10 years, he now runs a restaurant in Hanoi a stone's throw from a much-bombed bridge on the Red River. At 45, he has never traveled abroad [true as of 1996, when this piece was written]. Considering the paucity of translated books in Vietnam, even after the easing of state censorship, Thiệp's eclectic reading list, as revealed in his own essays and interviews, is an index to the mental life of a contemporary Hanoi intellectual: all the great Vietnamese poets, from the 15th century Nguyễn Trãi to Nguyễn Du; Chinese modern fiction pioneer Lu Tsun; first century BC Chinese historian Si Ma Quan (in Phan Ngọc's translation); The Three Kingdoms; Dostoyevski; Gogol; Gorky; Maupassant; Camus; Goethe; Tagore; Neruda; the Bible. Western and overseas Vietnamese critics, in assessing his varied output, have tripped over each other delineating his affinities with experimental writers such as Borges, Eco and Rushdie, most of whom he has never heard of. Like Europeans discovering Modernism through African sculptures, Thiệp arrived at something like Post-Modernism through the goblin stories of Lĩnh Nam Chích Quái and lores of the Black Thai minority.

The stories in Night, Again testify to the resilience of literature in a country which does not reward and often punishes its best writers, where the most famous author is banned and the most accomplished is an erudite maitre d'. For those in exile, there is the unreality of writing in a language one does not hear everyday for a tiny and scattered audience. Still, the need to probe one's experiences through fiction persist stubbornly, in spite of the question Thiệp asked himself once, in an essay: "Dear monkey, who needs a talented writer?"
