= Dương Thu Hương =

Vietnamese writer

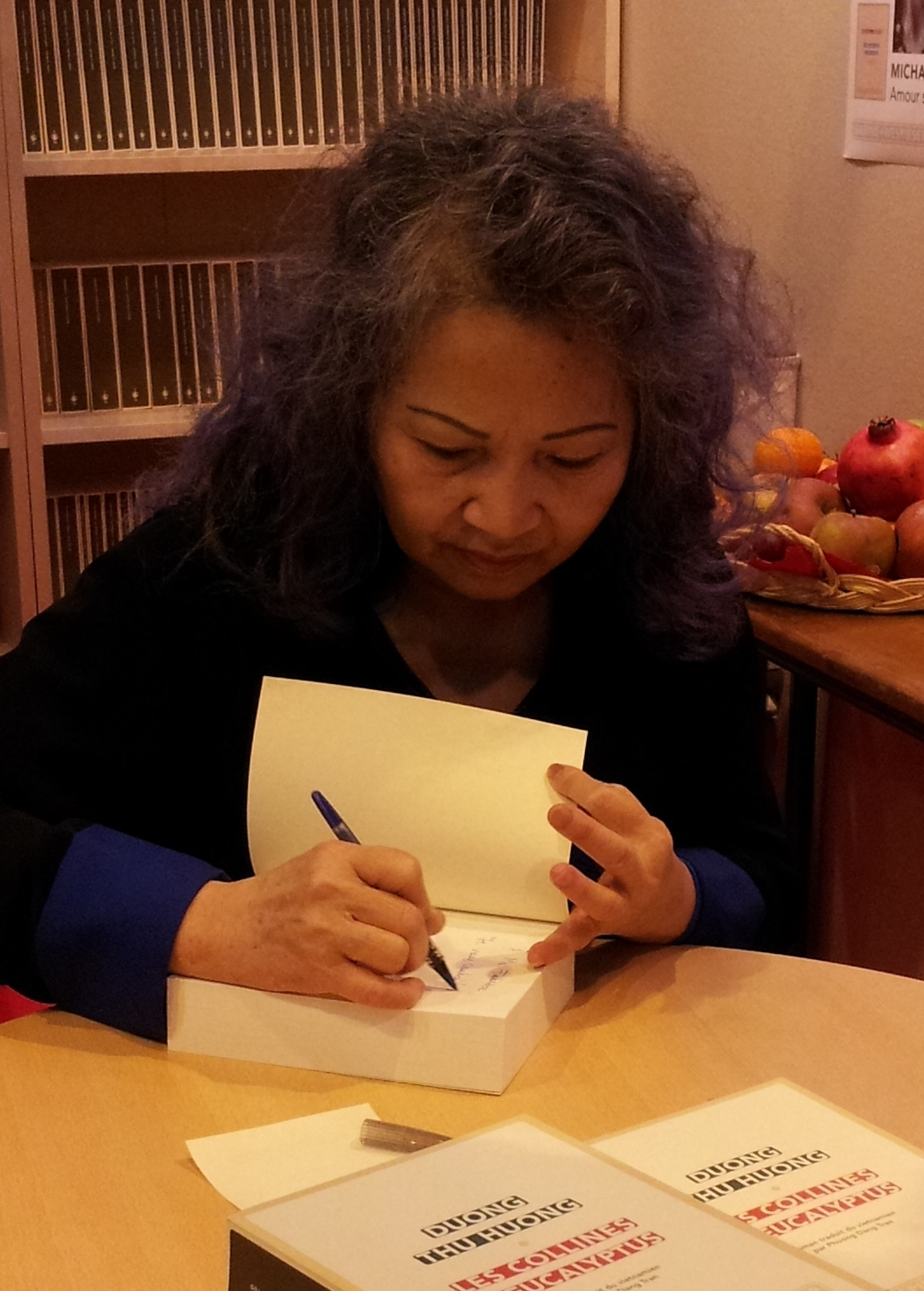
- Dương Thu Hương, 2014
- Born: Dương Thu Hương; 1947 (age 78–79); Thái Bình, Vietnam
- Occupation: author
- Writing career
- Language: Vietnamese, English, French
- Period: 1985-present
- Notable work: Paradise of the Blind (1988)
- Movement: Dissident

Dương Thu Hương (born 1947) is a Vietnamese author and political dissident.

== Biography ==
=== Early life ===
Born in 1947 in Thái Bình, a province in northern Vietnam, Dương Thu Hương came of age just as the Vietnam War was turning violent. At the age of twenty, when she was a student at the Vietnamese Ministry of Culture's Arts College, Hương volunteered to serve in a women's youth brigade on the front lines of the so-called "War against the Americans". Hương spent the next seven years of the war in the jungles and tunnels of Bình Trị Thiên, the most heavily bombarded region of the war. Her mission was to "sing louder than the bombs" and to give theatrical performances for the North Vietnamese troops, but also to tend to the wounded, bury the dead, and accompany the soldiers along. She was one of three survivors out of the forty volunteers in that group. She was also at the front during China's 1979 attacks on Vietnam in the short-lived Sino-Vietnamese War. However, in the period after Vietnam's reunification in 1975, Hương became increasingly outspoken and critical of the repressive atmosphere created by the Communist government. Upon seeing the conditions in the south, compared with the north, she began speaking out against the communist government. She was expelled from the party in 1989, denied the right to travel abroad, and temporarily imprisoned for her writings and outspoken criticism of corruption in the Vietnamese government.

=== Writings ===
Her first novels, Journey in Childhood (Hành trình ngày thơ ấu, 1985), Beyond Illusions (Bên kia bờ ảo vọng, 1987), Paradise of the Blind (Những thiên đường mù, 1988), and The Lost Life (Quãng đời đánh mất, 1989), were published in her native Vietnam and soon became bestsellers in Vietnam before they were banned. The third one was also the first Vietnamese novel ever published in the United States in English. Of her next three books, Novel Without a Name (Tiểu thuyết vô đề, 1991), Memories of a Pure Spring (2000), and No Man's Land (Chốn vắng, 2002), only the last remains unpublished in the United States. She was made a Chevalier of the Ordre des Arts et des Lettres by the French government (1994). She earlier wrote a number of short stories and screenplays. One story, "Reflections of Spring", was translated by Linh Dinh and included in the anthology Night, Again: Contemporary Fiction from Vietnam (Seven Stories Press 2006). Her novel No Man's Land (Terre des oublis in French, which won the Grand Prix des lectrices de Elle (2007)), was perhaps her most successful; it was in the final list of the Prix Femina 2006 and received the Grand Prix des Lectrices de Elle in 2007.

=== Political fallout ===
Dương Thu Hương was labelled as a "dissident writer" and was expelled by Vietnam's Communist Party and was imprisoned for a short time in 1991 for remarks criticizing the goals and interests of the party and its members. This is not unusual in contemporary Vietnam; Linh Dinh, in his introduction to the collection Night, Again, details the government's extreme response to certain subjects in writing – for example, in 1956, the poet Tran Dan was arrested for capitalizing "He" in a brief passage of a poem cataloging social despair, since such a designation was reserved for Ho Chi Minh. In 1991, Le Minh Khue was still criticized for having a North Vietnamese female soldier daydream about the smile of a handsome South Vietnamese prisoner of war .

Although she is one of Vietnam's most popular writers, most of her fiction is published outside of Vietnam due to censorship and the government's monopoly on the publishing industry.

Recently, she has retired and earns a pension of approximately twenty U.S. dollars per month and must earn her living working as a translator and trying to publish her novels and short stories abroad. She believes in struggling to gain democracy; while unable to run for political office or organize a competing party, she now uses writing in order to articulate that message.

In her story, "The Story of an Actress," Dương combines her passionate beliefs about human freedom with her existentialist literary sensibilities. Bê and Thom live next door to one another and become best friends; while Bê is intelligent and fun-loving, Thom develops into the town's beauty. Thom ends up marrying the most famous theatre director in Vietnam, a man 40 years her senior, in an attempt to become an actress; Bê visits her and watches her life disintegrate as she works toward her degree and her own life dream.

On the surface, it seems to be a simple story about two girls growing up and choosing different paths in life. However, her language and the details, as with Ho Xuan Huong, reveal a deeper meaning beneath the seemingly simple story. She critiques a contemporary society in which beauty is valued more than intellect and wealth more than kindness. She also draws attention to how the optimism of youth, when it fades, can be so devastating that it drives people to despair.

According to Dương, most writers must learn how to voice their individual concerns within a group mentality. In other words, their writing must reflect the individual and the masses at large in a way that's approved by the party; Dương finds that most writers in contemporary Vietnam get caught up in the group-thinking mentality.

Dương has felt the effects of censorship perhaps more cruelly than many of her fellow writers. Her work is not contained in any Vietnamese anthologies or collections. Though she has achieved success and renown abroad for her novels through translation, the audience she is writing for in Vietnam, who would most understand the minutiae of her stories, does not often have the opportunity to read her work, except when it is smuggled into the country.

Dương has expressed optimism about the future of writing in her country, noting that she believes awareness of the issues facing her homeland will increase over time.

Dương moved to Paris in 2006. In January 2009, her latest novel, Đỉnh Cao Chói Lọi, was published; it was also translated into French as Au zénith.

== Awards and honors ==
- 1994: Chevalier des Arts et des Lettres
- 2001: Prince Claus Award
- 2005: Oxfam Novib/PEN Award
- 2007: Grand prix des lectrices de Elle
- 2023: Prix mondial Cino Del Duca

== Publications ==
=== Novels ===
Year	Original title	English title	Publications
1985	Hành trình ngày thơ ấu	Journey of Childhood	
1987	Bên kia bờ ảo vọng	Beyond Illusions	
1988	Những thiên đường mù	Paradise of the Blind	
1989	Quãng đời đánh mất	Lost Life	
1995	Tiểu thuyết vô đề	Novel Without A Name	
1996	Lưu ly	Memories of a Pure Spring	
2002	Chốn vắng	No Man's Land	
2009	Đỉnh cao chói lọi	The Zenith	
2011	Hậu cung của con tim	Sanctuary of the Heart	
2013	Đồi bạch đàn	Eucalyptus Hills	

=== Short Story Collections ===
Year	Original title	English title	Publications
1980	Những bông bần ly	The Cork Flowers	
1980	Một bờ cây đỏ thắm	A Shore of Crimson Trees	
1985	Ban mai yên ả	Peaceful Dawn	
1985	Đối thoại sau bức tường	Dialogue Behind the Wall	
1985	Chân dung người hàng xóm	Portrait of a Neighbor	
1986	Chuyện tình kể trước lúc rạng đông	Love Story Before Dawn	
1988	Các vĩ nhân tỉnh lẻ	Provincial Greats	
