= Nguyễn Quốc Chánh =

Vietnamese poet (born 1958)

Nguyễn Quốc Chánh (born 1958) is a Vietnamese poet. He was born in Bạc Liêu, and now lives in Ho Chi Minh City. He is the author of four collections of poems, Night of the Rising Sun (Đêm mặt trời mọc 1990), Inanimate Weather (Khí hậu đồ vật 1997), the e-book Coded Personal Info (Của căn cước ẩn dụ 2001) and the samizdat Hey, I'm Here (Ê, tao đây 2005). His poems have been translated into English by Linh Dinh and published in the journals The Literary Review and Filling Station, and in “Of Vietnam: Identities in Dialogues” (Palgrave 2001). Along with Phan Nhien Hao and Van Cam Hai, he's featured in “Three Vietnamese Poets” (Tinfish 2001), also translated by Linh Dinh. From the introduction to that book:

Chanh's first collection, Night Of The Rising Sun, came out in 1990 and was greeted by a degree of hostility almost comic in its intensity. In an article titled "The Bizarre in Night Of The Rising Sun," the newspaper Youth compared Chanh's work to "a cemetery of the spirit and of the body. There is nothing left for a person to look for or to lean on. [...] This work can only lead man towards madness, irresponsibility, obliviousness towards the present, humans and objects, the lofty and the abject, the real and the fake, right and wrong, virtues and cruelties are here mixed together in a slimy disgusting gob." In an article titled "An Unhealthy Book," the newspaper The People began by complaining of the "somewhat murky and entirely irrational title." Then it evoked Chanh's poem "Prometheus" to predict that both the poet's life and career will perish in a flame he's "toying with."

In 2005, he gave a reading with Linh Dinh at Berlin's Haus der Kulturen der Welt, as part of its Southeast Asian arts festival.
