= Vũ Xuân Cường =

Vietnamese footballer

Personal information
- Full name: Vũ Xuân Cường
- Date of birth: August 6, 1992 (age 34)
- Place of birth: Tĩnh Gia, Thanh Hóa, Vietnam
- Height: 1.70 m (5 ft 7 in)
- Position: Left-back

Team information
- Current team: Quy Nhơn Bình Định
- Number: 15

Youth career
- 2004–2012: Thanh Hóa

Senior career*
Years	Team	Apps	(Gls)
2013–2023	Thanh Hóa	80	(1)
2015–2016	→ Đồng Tháp (loan)	18	(0)
2023–	Quy Nhơn Bình Định	13	(1)

International career
2016–2017	Vietnam	2	(0)
- * Club domestic league appearances and goals

Vũ Xuân Cường (born 6 August 1992) is a Vietnamese footballer who plays as a centre-back for V.League 2 club Quy Nhơn Bình Định

== Honours ==
=== Club ===
Đông Á Thanh Hóa

- Vietnamese National Cup:

(bronze) Third place : 2022
(gold) Champion : 2023
