= Như Thanh =

- Commune
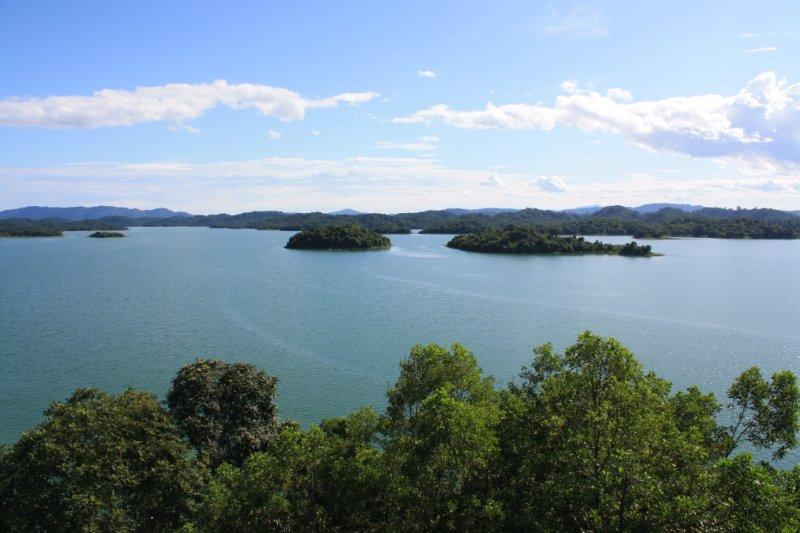
- Sông Mực Lake in Bến En National Park
- Interactive map of Như Thanh
- Coordinates: 19°38′30″N 105°35′09″E
- Country: Vietnam
- Region: North Central Coast
- Province: Thanh Hóa
- Established: 16 June 2025
- Administrative headquarters: Vĩnh Long Hamlet

Area
  - Total: 84.07 km^{2} (32.46 sq mi)

Population (2024)
  - Total: 26,231
  - Density: 312/km^{2} (810/sq mi)
- Postal code: 42423
- Website: nhuthanh.thanhhoa.gov.vn

Như Thanh is a commune in Thanh Hóa province, Vietnam. The commune inherited its name from the former Như Thanh district.

On 16 June 2025, Như Thanh district was dissolved as part of the 2025 Vietnamese administrative reform, which abolished the district-level administrative system. Như Thanh Commune was established under Resolution No. 1686/NQ-UBTVQH15 of the Standing Committee of the National Assembly of Vietnam, through the merger of:

- the entirety of Bến Sung township and Xuân Khang and Hải Long communes;
- Yên Trung Hamlet of Yên Thọ commune, formerly part of Như Thanh district, with the remaining area of Yên Thọ commune merged into Yên Thọ commune.
