= Tân Dân =

- Ward
- Interactive map of Tân Dân
- Coordinates: 19.52632263969863°N 105.79583804241936°E
- Country: Vietnam
- Region: North Central Coast
- Province: Thanh Hóa
- Established: 16 June 2025
- Administrative headquarters: Hồ Trung Residential Group

Area
  - Total: 24.59 km^{2} (9.49 sq mi)

Population (2024)
  - Total: 22,095
  - Density: 898/km^{2} (2,330/sq mi)
- Postal code: 42712
- Website: tandan.thanhhoa.gov.vn

Tân Dân is a ward in Thanh Hóa province, Vietnam.

On 16 June 2025, Nghi Sơn town was dissolved as part of the 2025 Vietnamese administrative reform, which abolished the district-level administrative system. Tân Dân Ward was established under Resolution No. 1686/NQ-UBTVQH15 of the Standing Committee of the National Assembly of Vietnam, through the merger of the entire area and population of Hải An and Tân Dân wards, together with Ngọc Lĩnh commune.

Tân Dân Ward was originally established on 1 June 2020 as a ward of Nghi Sơn town. It became an administrative unit directly under Thanh Hóa province following the dissolution of Nghi Sơn town on 16 June 2025.
