= Như Xuân =

- Commune
- Interactive map of Như Xuân
- Coordinates: 19°40′00″N 105°26′35″E
- Country: Vietnam
- Region: North Central Coast
- Province: Thanh Hóa
- Established: 16 June 2025
- Administrative headquarters: Yên Bình Hamlet

Area
  - Total: 69.87 km^{2} (26.98 sq mi)

Population (2024)
  - Total: 13,496
  - Density: 193/km^{2} (500/sq mi)
- Postal code: 42524
- Website: nhuxuan.thanhhoa.gov.vn

Như Xuân is a commune in Thanh Hóa province, Vietnam. The commune inherited its name from the former Như Xuân district.

On 16 June 2025, Như Xuân district was dissolved as part of the 2025 Vietnamese administrative reform, which abolished the district-level administrative system. Như Xuân Commune was established under Resolution No. 1686/NQ-UBTVQH15 of the Standing Committee of the National Assembly of Vietnam, through the merger of the entire area and population of Yên Cát township and Tân Bình commune.
