= The Sorrow of War =

Vietnamese war novel by Bảo Ninh

- Author: Bao Ninh
- Original title: Thân phận tình yêu (Identity of love)
- Translator: Frank Palmos; Vo Bang Thanh; Phan Thanh Hao
- Language: Vietnamese
- Publisher: Hội nhà văn
- Publication date: 1991
- Publication place: Vietnam
- English publication date: 1994
- Pages: 283

The Sorrow of War (Vietnamese: Nỗi buồn chiến tranh), formerly titled The Destiny of Love (Thân phận của tình yêu), is a novel by Vietnamese writer Bảo Ninh. Written in 1987, the work was first published in Vietnam in 1990. The story follows Kiên, a romantic and idealistic young man whose life is upended by the Vietnam War. After witnessing immense loss and death, Kiên is left haunted and isolated, and struggles to reintegrate into civilian life during peacetime.

The Sorrow of War has received acclaim from writers and scholars both domestically and internationally. Departing from the traditional epic heroism of previous Vietnamese literature, the novel sparked intense controversy among critics and the public upon its release. By 2016, it had become the most translated and published Vietnamese novel in the international book market. Excerpts from the book were also included in the 12th-grade literature textbook for high schools in Vietnam. Alongside Nguyễn Du's The Tale of Kiều, Bảo Ninh's The Sorrow of War is one of the two most widely recognized works of Vietnamese literature globally.

It is also one of the few Vietnamese literary works held in the Nobel Library. The novel has earned Bảo Ninh numerous prestigious awards both in Vietnam and abroad.

== Original and English version ==
Bảo Ninh achieved prominence in Hanoi with the first version of the novel, Thân phận của tình yêu (English: The Destiny (Identity) of Love), published on a Roneo duplicator (similar to a mimeograph) before 1990. Soon afterwards Phan Thanh Hao translated it into English and took the manuscript to the British publishers Secker & Warburg. Geoffrey Mulligan, an editor there, commissioned Frank Palmos, an Australian journalist who had reported on the Vietnam War and written about it in his book Ridding the Devils (1990), to write an English version based on the raw translation. Bao Ninh had read Phan Thanh Hao's Vietnamese translation of Ridding the Devils and willingly agreed to this suggestion. After several meetings with both the author and the translator, Hao, in Hanoi, and journeys throughout Vietnam to check details, Palmos wrote the English version over seven months in secret in his home in Warwick, a suburb of Perth, Western Australia. It was published in 1994 under the title The Sorrow of War.

Counterfeits of the English version became widely available in Vietnam, aimed at the tourist trade. Counterfeit sales have reportedly far exceeded sales of the original edition. In November 2017 the Book Distributors Guild of Vietnam named the English version of Sorrow as the biggest selling Vietnamese book in the country's history.

In 1991, the book received the Vietnamese Writers' Association Awards, publications were then subsequently restricted from the year 1993 to 2005. In 2006, fifteen years after its publication, the restriction on the book was lifted, and the English edition appeared across bookshops and newsstands in Vietnam. The Sorrow of War was then published in Vietnamese, under the title Nỗi buồn chiến tranh.

It has since been translated into 14 other languages, most from the Palmos English version. The versions directly translated from the Vietnamese include the French version by Phan Huy Đường in 1994, the Japanese version by Okawa Hitoshi (大川均) in 1999 and the Chinese version by Xia Lu (夏露) in 2019.

== Overview ==
The Sorrow of War, written in the stream of consciousness style, opens with a depiction of soldiers on a postwar mission to collect the bones of fallen comrades for reburial. Thus begins the non-linear narrative by Kien, a North Vietnamese soldier during the Vietnam War, chronicling his loss of innocence, his love, and his anguish at the memories of war.

Kien rides in the truck searching for the remains of fallen soldiers in what he imagines as the "jungle of screaming souls," and recalls that this is where the 27th Battalion was obliterated except for a handful of survivors. His flashbacks tie the novel together. The theme of these flashbacks centers around the love between Kien and his childhood sweetheart, Phuong. Kien writes a novel about it, then tries to burn it. A mute girl whom Kien sees when drunk, to whom he pours out his thoughts, obtains the text after his departure. Kien, in the book, reflects on his experiences, on the many unacknowledged sacrifices, such as Hoa giving up her life to save Kien and his comrades from American soldiers, and acts of immorality and desecration, such as the objectification and treatment of a dead woman in the airport. The novel climaxes with Kien's reflections on his first personal kill, which occurs after he witnesses Phuong's rape. The novel ends with a passage by a new narrator, who explains that he received Kien's novel from the mute girl.

== Reception ==
Michael Fathers of The Independent noted how both American and Vietnamese cultural depictions of the Vietnam War had tended to be full of romanticisation and stereotyping, and wrote: "The Sorrow of War soars above all this. ... It moves backwards and forwards in time, and in and out of despair, dragging you down as the hero-loner leads you through his private hell in the highlands of Central Vietnam, or pulling you up when his spirits rise. It is a fine war novel and a marvellous book."

The British author-photographer Tim Page and others have compared the novel favorably to Erich Maria Remarque's All Quiet on the Western Front.

The British newspaper The Independent judged The Sorrow of War the Best Foreign Book of 1994. The prize money was equally shared by the author, Bao Ninh, the translator, Phan Thanh Hao, and Frank Palmos, the author of the English version for publication. In 2010, the British Society of Authors listed the translation as one of the Best 50 Translations of the previous century.

German literature professor and translator Günter Giesenfeld (who translated the work into German) remarked that the book "ranks among the world classics of war literature." He compared The Sorrow of War to renowned novels such as All Quiet on the Western Front (Erich Maria Remarque) and appraised Bao Ninh's work as even superior to Remarque's. American author Leif A. Torkelsen also rated The Sorrow of War as the greatest war novel of the 20th century. Lai Chen Sun, a history professor at the University of California, conducted a comprehensive study on the novel's international influence, noting that approximately 30 universities use it as a teaching resource. He argued that The Sorrow of War has significantly impacted and transformed the teaching of Eastern military history, describing it as "one of the greatest literary works in the world" and "the most famous work on war of the 20th century." Chinese writer Yan Lianke regarded the novel as an "exceedingly rare masterpiece by an East Asian writer," marking a "new pinnacle for a new kind of literature" through its "exceptional depiction, perception, and aesthetic critique of war, combined with a profound understanding of humanity and reflections on human nature." After reading the Chinese translation, Yan Lianke included The Sorrow of War in the mandatory foreign reading list for creative writing students at Renmin University of China.

However, in Vietnam, the work has been criticized by many, especially Vietnam War veterans, as "reactionary," "decadent," and "distorting the image of the Vietnam People's Army." Opponents have repeatedly called on the Vietnamese government to withdraw the novel and remove it from textbooks.

Writer Trần Thanh Cảnh expressed surprise and criticized allegations that the novel tarnished the image of "Uncle Ho's soldiers" or engaged in "historical revisionism." Through his interactions with numerous pre-1975 veterans, he noted their consensus on the book's authenticity, with some even asserting that the reality of the battlefield was "far more agonizing and brutal than depicted in the book. Nguyễn Ngọc Hùng, a veteran who enlisted in 1969, remarked that Bảo Ninh provided an accurate portrayal of the war's reality, stating that he could "revisit the faces of my friends through every line."

== See also ==
- 1990 in literature
- Vietnamese literature
