= Nghi Sơn =

- Ward
- Interactive map of Nghi Sơn
- Coordinates: 19.33524972701427°N 105.80033148685254°E
- Country: Vietnam
- Region: North Central Coast
- Province: Thanh Hóa
- Established: 16 June 2025
- Administrative headquarters: Lê Thế Long Street, Bắc Hải Residential Group

Area
  - Total: 42.82 km^{2} (16.53 sq mi)

Population (2024)
  - Total: 32,939
  - Density: 769/km^{2} (1,990/sq mi)
- Postal code: 42739
- Website: phuongnghison.thanhhoa.gov.vn

Nghi Sơn is a ward in Thanh Hóa province, Vietnam. The ward inherited its name from the former Nghi Sơn town.

On 16 June 2025, Nghi Sơn town was dissolved as part of the 2025 Vietnamese administrative reform, which abolished the district-level administrative system. Nghi Sơn Ward was established under Resolution No. 1686/NQ-UBTVQH15 of the Standing Committee of the National Assembly of Vietnam, through the merger of the entire area and population of Hải Thượng Ward, Hải Hà Commune, and Nghi Sơn Commune.
