= Bến En National Park =

National park in Vietnam

Ben En National Park
- IUCN category II (national park)
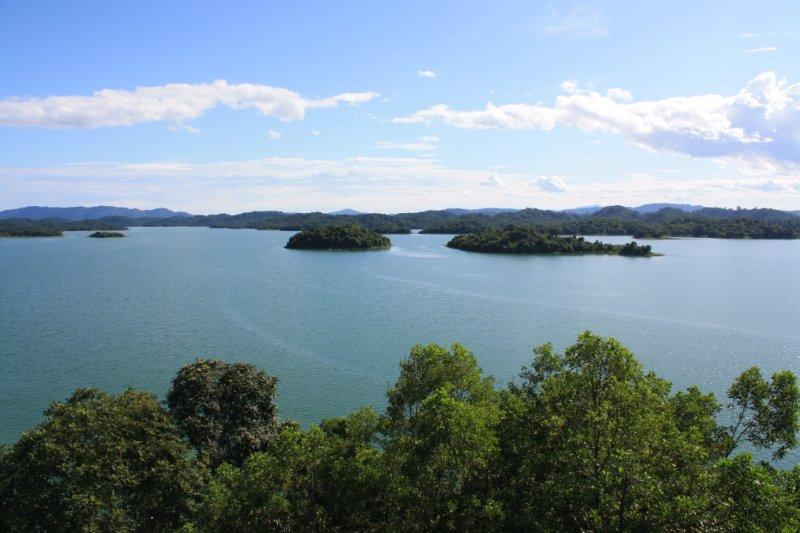
- Lake Song Muc in Ben En National Park.

- Location within Vietnam
- Location: Bac Trung Bo
- Nearest city: Thanh Hóa
- Coordinates: 19°37′00″N 105°31′30″E
- Area: 147.35 km^{2} (56.89 sq mi)
- Established: 1992
- Visitors: 6570 (in 2011)
- Governing body: Ministry of Agriculture and Rural Development of Thanh Hóa Province

Ben En National Park (Vietnamese: Vườn quốc gia Bến En) is a national park in Thanh Hóa Province, Vietnam. The national park was founded by the decision 33 dated 27 January 1992 of the Chairman of the Council of Ministers of Vietnam.

== Location ==
The national park is situated in districts of Như Thanh and Như Xuân, Thanh Hóa Province. The park is about 46 kilometres (29 mi) southwest of Thanh Hoa City. The coordinates: 19°31′ to 19°43′ N and 105°25′ to 105°38′ E.

Total area is 14,735 hectares (57 sq mi), of which primitive forest covers 8,544 hectares (33 sq mi). There are mounts, hills, streams, rivers in the park area. The park features a 3,000 hectares (12 sq mi) lake with 21 islets.

== Biodiversity ==
Studies found that there are several rare species in this park. So far recovered were 1,389 species of plants, 1,004 species of animals, 66 species of mammals, 201 species of birds, 54 species of reptiles, 31 species of amphibians, 68 species of fish and 499 species of insects. There are 462 varieties of flora in the park, and 125 orders. Probably some of the reported species are now extinct. In Ben En National Park the endangered tree species Erythrophleum fordii still can be found. In 2011 Vietnamese and Singaporean scientists discovered the new ginger species Distichochlamys benenica.

== Tourism ==
The primary draw of the national park is Lake Song Muc, accessible for exploration via motor boat or kayak. Other notable attractions include caves located in both the South and North regions of the park. There are two forest trails available: one begins near the national park's guesthouse, while the other is located on one of the islands within the park. This island also features two holiday homes available for rental. The guesthouse near the dam provides basic accommodation options for visitors.

== Ethnic groups ==
Different ethnic groups including the Thai, Tho and Muong live within the national park.
