= Bảo Ninh =

Vietnamese writer

- Born: Hoàng Ấu Phương; October 18, 1952 (age 73); Nghệ An, Vietnam
- Occupations: Novelist; essayist; short story writer
- Writing career
- Years active: 1990–present
- Genres: Memoirs, war stories, short stories
- Military career
- Allegiance: North Vietnam
- Branch: Vietnam People's Army
- Service years: 1969–1975
- Unit: Glorious 27th Youth Brigade
- Conflicts: Vietnam War

Hoàng Ấu Phương, known by the pen name Bảo Ninh (born 18 October 1952), is a Vietnamese novelist, essayist and writer of short stories, best known for his first novel, published in English as The Sorrow of War.

== Vietnam war ==
Ninh recounted that American bombing raids during the Vietnam War, beginning in 1965 when he was 12-13, destroyed ordinary people's homes and upended their lives. Ninh stated that his own school in Hanoi was relocated as a result of the bombing, which inspired him to anger rather than fear. Ninh stated that Americans entering Vietnam were viewed as no different from earlier French colonizers, and that he inherited this view himself from his parents.

During the war, Ninh served in the Glorious 27th Youth Brigade, joining when he was 17 years old. He stated that the Vietnamese people who fought against the Americans were not specifically fighting for Marxism, but rather fighting to bring peace for their country. Hunger was a frequent problem for Ninh and his fellow soldiers, who often moved back and forth from their homes to the battlefields. Of the five hundred who went to war with the brigade in 1969, Ninh is one of ten who survived.

Ninh described the fear caused among Vietnamese soldiers by American airpower while in combat during the war:

"While the bombs were falling, only a stone wouldn't be terrified. If the Americans noticed movement in the forest, they would eliminate the forest. Who knows how much money was spent? American taxpayers' money. If a cluster of napalm bombs were dropped, the jungle would turn into a sea of fire. Can you imagine a sea of fire?"

— Bảo Ninh

In Ken Burns's series The Vietnam War introduction, Ninh said "In war, no one wins or loses. There is only destruction", called the war "fratricide" fueled by American firepower.

== Author ==
In 1987, Bảo Ninh published Trại bảy chú lùn (Camp of Seven Dwarves), a collection of short stories. He has also written a second novel, Steppe, but is said to be reluctant to publish it.

A short story by Bảo Ninh, "A Marker on the Side of the Boat" (Khắc dấu mạn thuyền), translated by Linh Dinh, is included in the anthology Night, Again.

Bảo Ninh is also a successful essayist. He is interviewed in Ken Burns's series The Vietnam War.

== Awards ==
Ninh won the 1994 Independent Foreign Fiction Prize for his novel The Sorrow of War.

== Works ==
- The Sorrow of War - 1990
- Hanoi At No Time - 2003, also published as Hanoi at Midnight
- Rambling while stuck in traffic - 2005
- Are old stories true? - 2009
- Selected Writings - 2011
- Short story - 2013
