= Tĩnh Gia =

- Ward
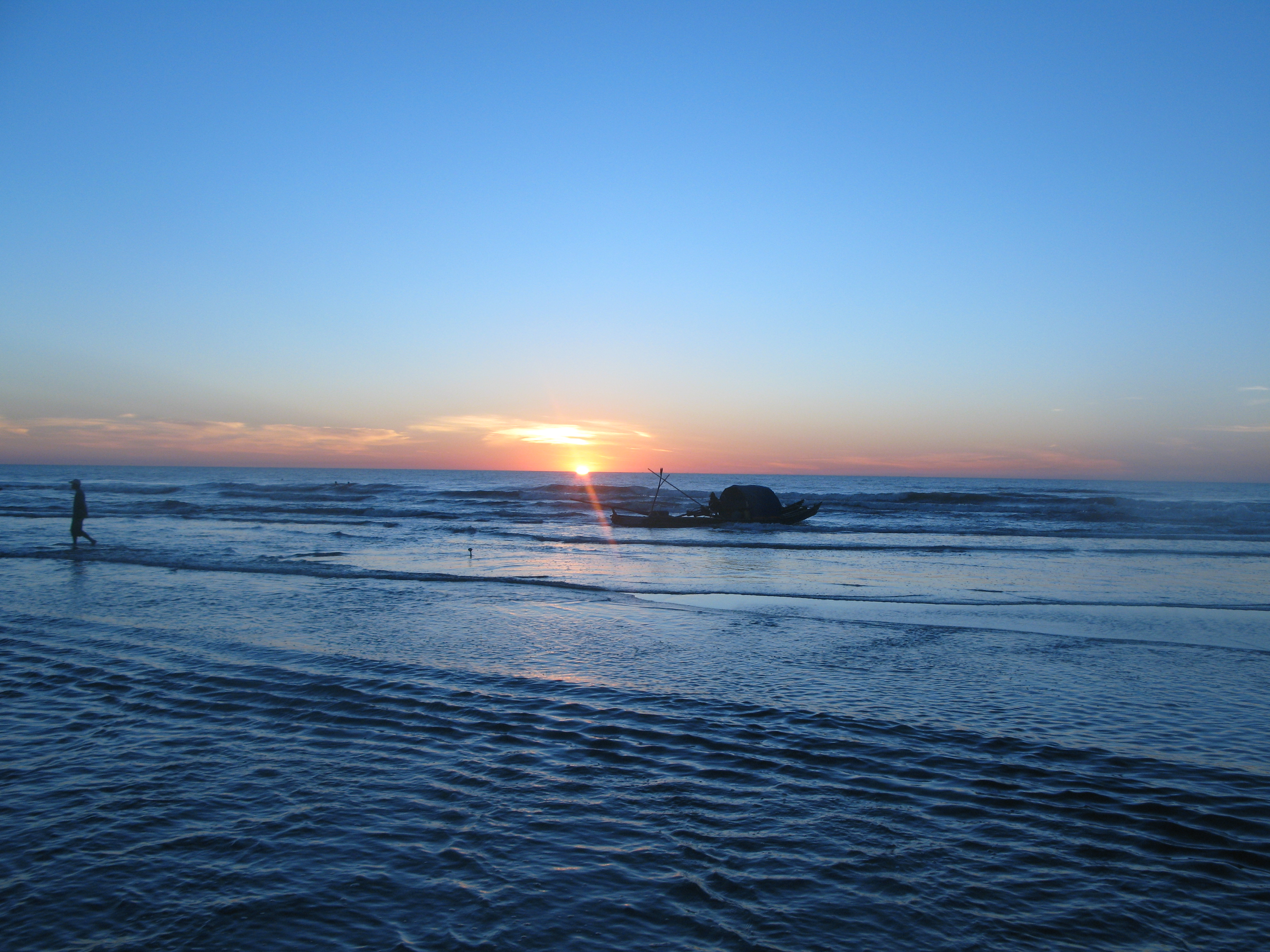
- Sunrise over Hải Hòa Beach
- Interactive map of Tĩnh Gia
- Coordinates: 19.449073851230388°N 105.7801845779257°E
- Country: Vietnam
- Region: North Central Coast
- Province: Thanh Hóa
- Established: 16 June 2025
- Administrative headquarters: Lê Thế Sơn Street, Residential Group 1

Area
  - Total: 32.18 km^{2} (12.42 sq mi)

Population (2024)
  - Total: 58,583
  - Density: 1,820/km^{2} (4,700/sq mi)
- Postal code: 42741
- Website: tinhgia.thanhhoa.gov.vn

Tĩnh Gia is a ward in Thanh Hóa province, Vietnam. The ward inherited its name from the former Tĩnh Gia district, before the district was reorganized as Nghi Sơn town.

On 16 June 2025, Nghi Sơn town was dissolved as part of the 2025 Vietnamese administrative reform, which abolished the district-level administrative system. Tĩnh Gia Ward was established under Resolution No. 1686/NQ-UBTVQH15 of the Standing Committee of the National Assembly of Vietnam, through the merger of the entire area and population of Hải Hòa, Bình Minh, and Hải Thanh wards, together with Hải Nhân commune.
