= 2012 Vietnamese National Football First League =

V.League 2
- Season: 2012
- Dates: 30 December 2011 – 18 August 2012
- Champions: Đồng Tâm Long An
- Runner up: Đồng Nai
- Promoted: Đồng Tâm Long An; Đồng Nai
- Relegated: XM Fico Tây Ninh; Thành phố Hồ Chí Minh
- Top goalscorer: (Mali) Souleymane Diabate (21 goals)

The 2012 Vietnamese National Football First League season was the 18th season of Vietnam's professional football league. It began on 30 December 2011 and finished on 18 August 2012.

Đồng Tâm Long An is winner.

== Teams ==
=== Stadia and locations ===
Club	Based	Home stadium	Capacity	Manager
Hùng Vương An Giang	Long Xuyên	An Giang Stadium	10,000	(Vietnam) Nhan Thiện Nhân
TDC Bình Dương	Thủ Dầu Một	Gò Đậu Stadium	18,250	(Vietnam) Võ Hồng Phúc
SQC Bình Định	Quy Nhơn	Quy Nhơn Stadium	25,000	(Vietnam) Trần Kim Đức (interim)
XSKT Cần Thơ	Cần Thơ	Cần Thơ Stadium	50,000	(Vietnam) Huỳnh Ngọc San
Trẻ SHB Đà Nẵng	Đà Nẵng	Chi Lăng Stadium	40,000	(Vietnam) Phan Công Thìn
Berjaya Đồng Nai	Biên Hòa	Đồng Nai Stadium	5,000	(Vietnam) Trần Bình Sự
Trẻ Hà Nội T&T	Hà Nội	Hàng Đẫy Stadium	22,500	(Vietnam) Hoàng Văn Phúc
Trẻ Hà Nội	Hà Nội	Hàng Đẫy Stadium	22,000	(Vietnam) Lê Quảng Ninh
Thành phố Hồ Chí Minh	Hồ Chí Minh City	Thống Nhất Stadium	25,000	(Serbia) Srdjan Zivojnov
Đồng Tâm Long An	Tân An	Long An Stadium	19,975	(Portugal) Francisco Vital
XSKT Lâm Đồng	Đà Lạt	Lâm Đồng Sports Centre	10,000	(Vietnam) Vũ Quang Bảo
BHTS Quảng Nam	Tam Kỳ	Tam Kỳ Stadium	15,624	(Vietnam) Trần Vũ
Than Quảng Ninh	Cẩm Phả	Cửa Ông Stadium	5,000	(Vietnam) Đinh Cao Nghĩa
XM Fico Tây Ninh	Tây Ninh	Tây Ninh Stadium	20,000	(Vietnam) Vũ Trường Giang

=== Managerial changes ===
Team	Outgoing manager	Manner of departure	Incoming manager
Đồng Tâm Long An	(Croatia) Buketa Ranko	Sacked	(Vietnam) Trần Công Minh
SQC Bình Định	(Vietnam) Hoàng Gia	Contract canceled	(Vietnam) Trần Kim Đức (interim)
Đồng Tâm Long An	(Vietnam) Trần Công Minh	Contract canceled	(Portugal) Francisco Vital

=== Foreign players ===
Câu lạc bộ	Visa 1	Visa 2	Visa 3	Non-Visa Foreign
Hùng Vương An Giang	(Nigeria) A.Suleiman	(Brazil) S.Zelateur	(Liberia) Alex Karmo	
TDC Bình Dương	(Brazil) David Carlos	(Cameroon) Nkemia Rim Marcelin	(Brazil) Neiva Borges Marcelo	
SQC Bình Định	(Zambia) Signs W.Chibambo	(Nigeria) Mark Richard Rutgers	(Nigeria) Daniel Onyekachi	(Nigeria) Amaobi
SHB Đà Nẵng B	(Nigeria) Uche Iheruome	(Netherlands) Alexander Prent	(Nigeria) Nweze Chinedu	
Berjaya Đồng Nai	(Malawi) Nyirenda Victor	(Uganda) Kiseka Henry	(Brazil) Douglas De Souza	
Hà Nội T&T B	(Brazil) Laerte Rodrigues De Azevedo Junior	(Togo) Yacoubou Fousseni Cherif	(Argentina) Leonel Ezequiel Felices	
Hà Nội B	(Sierra Leone) Hassan Koeman Sesay	(Jamaica) Errol Stevens	(Brazil) Eder Richartz	
BHTS Quảng Nam	(Ghana) David Annas	(Ghana) Attram Kwame	(Ghana) Dzigba B. Mawusi	
Thành phố Hồ Chí Minh	(Brazil) Enennido De Jesus	(Serbia) Cuckovic Obren	(Brazil) Bruno De Souza	
Đồng Tâm Long An	(Spain) Pablo Counago	Danny Mrwanda	(Brazil) Lazaro de Sousa	(Republic of the Congo) Tshamala A. Kabanga (Uganda) Isaac Kamu Mylyanga
XSKT Lâm Đồng	(Nigeria) Suleiman Abdullahi	(Brazil) Alex Wilton	(The Gambia) Modou Jagne	
XM Fico Tây Ninh	(Argentina) Diego Martin Mendez	(Brazil) Martins Trindade	(Nigeria) Ajoku Obinna	
Than Quảng Ninh	(Cameroon) Belibi Celestin Didier	(Ghana) Onyeky Philip Okoro	(Cameroon) Gaspard	
XSKT Cần Thơ	(Mali) Diabate Souleymane	(Mexico) François Endene	(Ghana) Mustapha Kobina Essuman	

== League table ==
Pos	Team	Pld	W	D	L	GF	GA	GD	Pts	Promotion or relegation
1	Đồng Tâm Long An (C, P)	26	15	4	7	36	26	+10	49	Promotion to 2013 Vietnamese Super League
2	Trẻ Hà Nội T&T	26	15	3	8	35	30	+5	48	
3	Đồng Nai (P)	26	11	7	8	40	30	+10	40	Promotion to 2013 Vietnamese Super League
4	Than Quảng Ninh	26	10	9	7	37	28	+9	39	
5	XSKT Cần Thơ	26	10	9	7	37	30	+7	39	
6	Bình Định	26	9	11	6	40	34	+6	38	
7	Trẻ SHB Đà Nẵng	26	10	7	9	42	39	+3	37	
8	XSKT Lâm Đồng	26	9	6	11	28	36	−8	33	
9	Hùng Vương An Giang	26	8	8	10	30	29	+1	32	
10	QNK Quảng Nam	26	7	10	9	27	32	−5	31	
11	Trẻ Hà Nội	26	8	5	13	34	34	0	29	
12	TDC Bình Dương	26	7	8	11	27	37	−10	29	
13	XM Fico Tây Ninh (R)	26	8	5	13	28	38	−10	29	Relegation to 2013 Vietnamese Second Division
14	Thành phố Hồ Chí Minh (R)	26	5	8	13	36	54	−18	23	Relegation to 2013 Vietnamese Second Division

Updated to match(es) played on 11 August 2012. Source: Vietnamese First Division
Rules for classification: 1) points; 2) goal difference; 3) number of goals scored.
(C) Champions; (P) Promoted; (R) Relegated

== Results ==
Home \ Away	HAG	TBD	BĐ	XCT	SĐN	ĐN	HNT	HAN	HCM	ĐLA	XLD	QNA	TQN	FTN
Hùng Vương An Giang		3–4	0–3	1–2	3–0	1–0	0–1	1–0	1–0	6–1	1–1	2–3	0–0	0–1
TDC Bình Dương	0–0		2–1	1–1	1–1	2–0	1–2	1–1	2–4	0–2	2–0	1–1	0–3	1–0
Bình Định	0–0	3–0		1–1	1–1	2–2	0–0	3–1	3–2	1–1	1–0	2–2	1–1	1–1
XSKT Cần Thơ	2–2	1–1	5–2		2–1	1–0	1–0	1–0	0–0	1–3	2–1	0–0	2–1	0–0
Trẻ SHB Đà Nẵng	1–2	2–1	2–1	4–3		3–3	0–0	1–2	2–2	1–2	2–1	0–0	3–0	0–1
Đồng Nai	0–0	0–0	2–0	3–2	2–4		1–2	2–0	1–1	2–1	4–0	2–0	3–1	3–0
Trẻ Hà Nội T&T	1–1	1–0	0–2	2–1	2–0	2–1		2–1	3–1	0–3	1–3	1–3	2–0	3–2
Trẻ Hà Nội	1–2	2–0	1–1	2–3	1–3	1–0	0–1		1–1	2–1	4–1	1–0	1–1	5–0
Thành phố Hồ Chí Minh	3–2	2–1	2–2	0–4	0–2	1–2	2–1	1–1		1–3	2–2	2–4	2–4	3–1
Đồng Tâm Long An	1–0	0–0	1–2	2–1	0–2	1–2	1–2	2–1	2–0		2–2	2–0	1–0	1–0
XSKT Lâm Đồng	2–1	1–0	0–1	1–0	3–2	2–2	1–2	2–1	1–0	0–1		1–0	1–1	1–0
QNK Quảng Nam	0–0	2–3	1–4	1–1	1–1	1–0	1–2	0–2	0–0	0–1	1–0		1–1	1–1
Than Quảng Ninh	2–0	3–1	3–1	1–0	3–1	0–0	3–2	2–1	5–1	0–0	1–1	0–1		1–1
XM Fico Tây Ninh	0–1	1–2	3–1	0–0	2–3	2–3	1–0	2–1	4–3	0–1	2–0	2–3	1–0	

Updated to match(es) played on 11 August 2012. Source: Vietnamese First Division
Legend: Blue = home team win; Yellow = draw; Red = away team win.
