= Paradise of the Blind =

1988 novel by Dương Thu Hương

- Author: Duong Thu Huong
- Original title: Những thiên đường mù
- Publication date: 1988
- Publication place: Vietnam
- English publication date: 1993

Paradise of the Blind (Những thiên đường mù) is a novel by writer Dương Thu Hương, published in 1988. It was the first Vietnamese novel published in English in the United States. It is now banned in Vietnam because of the political views it expounds.

== Plot ==
Paradise of the Blind follows a non-linear, vertical plot depicting the development of Hang, the narrator, through several life-changing events. An adult Hang in the 1980s receives a telegram stating that her uncle, Chinh, is ill and that she must visit him in Moscow. Throughout her journey to Moscow she recounts significant events in her childhood.

As she looks back on the past, she realizes it is the steadfast resolve toward familial duty that has made her family so miserable. She realizes this does not have to be her fate. While she is waiting to leave Russia for Vietnam, she sees a group of young Japanese students who are happy and laughing and free. She longs to be Japanese, of a race that does not carry the same burdens as her people. She resolves to do what it is that makes her happy because her duty to her mother—who would sacrifice her own daughter to help her corrupt brother—is not happiness.

== Characters ==
=== Main characters ===
- Hang
- Que
- Aunt Tam
- Uncle Chinh

=== Supporting characters ===
- Ton
- Aunt Chinh
- Man on the Train
- The Bohemian
- Madame Dua
