= Lê Minh Khuê =

Vietnamese writer (born 1949)

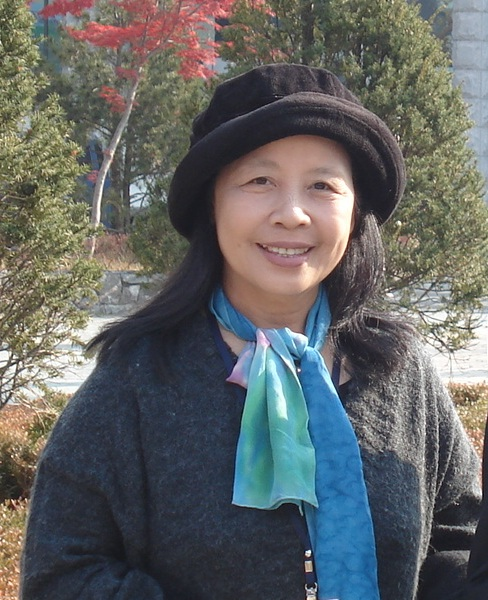
Lê Minh Khuê (2007)

Lê Minh Khuê (born 6 December 1949, in Tĩnh Gia, Thanh Hoá) is a Vietnamese writer. Her works have been translated into English and several other languages.

== Works ==
Translations:

- The stars, the earth, the river: short fiction by Le Minh Khue translated by Wayne Karlin, Dana Sachs Curbstone Press, 1997 (Note: "Fourteen stories by a North Vietnamese woman who fought in the Vietnam War as a sapper. The story, The Distant Stars, is on a trio of women serving as sappers. It is one of several stories chronicling experiences in battle.")
- Kleine Tragödien. Translated by Joachim Riethmann. Mitteldeutscher Verlag 2011
- Fragile come un raggio di sole. Racconti dal Vietnam. O Barra O Edizioni 2010
- Nach der Schlacht, Translated by Günter Giesenfeld, Marianne Ngo and Aurora Ngo, Argument Verlag 2017
