= Pham Thi Hoai =

Vietnamese writer, editor and translator

Phạm Thị Hoài (born 1960 in Gia Lộc, Hải Dương, Vietnam) is an influential contemporary Vietnamese writer, editor and translator, living in Germany.

== Biography ==
Born in Hải Dương province, Phạm Thị Hoài grew up in North Vietnam. In 1977, she went to former East Berlin to study at Humboldt University, where she earned a degree in Archival Studies. Returning to Vietnam in 1983, she lived in Hanoi where she worked as an archivist and began to write seriously.

Her first novel, Thiên sứ (The Heavenly Messenger and The Crystal Messenger, ISBN 1875657711), was published in Hanoi in 1988, and was subsequently banned by the Vietnamese government. Thiên sứ has since been translated into English, French, Spanish, Italian, German, and Finnish. In 1993, the German translation was awarded the annual Frankfurt LiBeraturpreis, awarded for the best foreign novel published in Germany and the English the Dinny O'Hearn Prize for Literary Translation in 2000. In the same year, Phạm Thị Hoài left Vietnam for Berlin, where she currently lives and works. From Berlin, Phạm Thị Hoài founded and continues to curate the influential internet journal Talawas, which was firewalled by the Vietnamese government since 2004. Her latest blog is called Pro&Contra.

In the Afterword to his translation of The Crystal Messenger Ton-That Quynh-Du writes of Phạm Thị Hoài:

In Vietnam her writing drew enthusiastic acclaim from readers and literary critics. Her detractors were just as vocal. Vietnam’s cultural bureaucrats objected to her critical views of contemporary Vietnam, and were offended by her lack of respect for traditions and disregard of social taboos […] Despite having been attacked in a public forum, Pham Thi Hoai has never been accused of political dissent. Instead, her detractors have charged her with holding an ‘excessively pessimistic view’ of Vietnam, of abusing the ‘sacred mission of a writer,’ and even of ‘salacious’ writing. But even her strongest critics acknowledge that she is a writer with a keen eye for detail, a humorous, acerbic wit, and a fine ear for the rhythms of the Vietnamese language.

In addition to the internationally acclaimed Thiên sứ, Phạm Thị Hoài has also published essays, two collections of short stories, Mê Lộ (1989) and Man Nương (1995), and another novel Marie Sến (1996). She is a noted translator of German literature and has translated works by Kafka, Bert Brecht, Thomas Bernhard, and Friedrich Dürrenmatt into Vietnamese. She is also the editor of Trần Dần – Ghi: 1954-1960 (Paris: TD Mémoire, 2001), a collection of Trần Dần's journal entries. Her short stories and essays have appeared in literary journals in the United States, Australia, Switzerland, and Germany, and in several anthologies of contemporary Vietnamese fiction, including Night, Again and Vietnam: A Traveler's Literary Companion. Sunday Menu, a selection of her short stories, was translated into English by Ton-That Quynh-Du. Originally published in French in 1997 as Menu de dimanche, Sunday Menu was published in Australia by Pandarus Books in 2006 and is distributed in North America by University of Hawaii Press.
