= Francisco Vital =

Portuguese football coach and former player

Personal information
- Full name: Francisco António Lucas Vital
- Date of birth: 27 June 1954 (age 72)
- Place of birth: Braga, Portugal
- Position: Forward

Youth career
- 1969–1970: Caldas
- 1970–1972: Benfica

Senior career*
Years	Team	Apps	(Gls)
1972–1973	Famalicão		
1973–1974	Marinhense		
1974–1977	Riopele		
1977–1980	Porto	42	(11)
1980	Betis	13	(0)
1980–1981	Benfica	15	(1)
1981–1982	Boavista	21	(2)
1982–1983	Farense		
1983–1984	Belenenses		
1984–1985	Tirsense		
1985–1987	Vizela	57	(17)
Total		148	(31)

International career
1971	Portugal U18	2	(0)
1975–1979	Portugal U21	6	(2)
1977	Portugal	1	(1)

Managerial career
- 1987–1989: Vizela
- 1990–1991: Joane
- 1991–1992: Marco
- 1992–1994: Caldas
- 1994–1995: Famalicão
- 1996–1997: Famalicão
- 1997: Sporting CP (assistant)
- 1997: Sporting CP
- 1998–1999: Penafiel
- 1999–2000: Naval
- 2000: Chaves
- 2000–2001: Fafe
- 2001–2002: Famalicão
- 2002–2003: Ribeirão
- 2004: Dong A Bank
- 2004–2005: Estarreja
- 2008–2009: Binh Duong
- 2012–2013: Dong Tam Long An
- * Club domestic league appearances and goals

Francisco António Lucas Vital (born 27 June 1954) is a Portuguese former football forward and manager.

== Playing career ==
Born in Braga, Vital spent all of his early career in the second division, mainly with G.D. Riopele. In 1977 he signed with FC Porto, going on to be irregularly played by the Primeira Liga club during his two-and-a-half-season spell and winning two national championships, contributing with a career-best 21 games and five goals in the 1978–79 edition.

In January 1980, Vital moved to La Liga with Real Betis – his only abroad experience – returning to his country in the summer to join S.L. Benfica, with whom he won another league as well as one Portuguese Cup and one domestic Supercup. After spending the 1981–82 campaign with Boavista F.C. he returned to the second level, where he remained until his retirement at the age of 33, mostly with F.C. Vizela.

As a Porto player, Vital appeared once for Portugal, featuring 45 minutes in a 4–0 home win against Cyprus for the 1978 FIFA World Cup qualifiers and scoring the third.

Francisco Vital: International goals
No.	Date	Venue	Opponent	Score	Result	Competition
1	16 November 1977	Estádio de São Luís, Faro, Portugal	Cyprus	3–0	4–0	1978 World Cup qualification

== Coaching career ==
Vital worked almost exclusively in the Portuguese lower leagues, his first stint being precisely with his last club Vizela. In 1997–98, his only season in the top tier, he was one of four managers for Sporting CP – having started as an assistant with the team – winning one match, drawing two and losing one as the Lions went on to finish in fourth position.

In the second part of the 2000s, Vital coached mainly in Vietnam, helping Đồng Tâm Long An F.C. return to the V-League in 2012.
