= Như Thanh district =

Coordinates: 19.617°N 105.533°E

Như Thanh district Huyện Như Thanh
- District
- Interactive map of Như Thanh district
- Country: Vietnam
- Region: North Central Coast
- Province: Thanh Hóa province
- Capital: Bến Sung

Area
  - Total: 226 sq mi (586 km^{2})

Population (2018)
  - Total: 95,360
- Time zone: UTC+7 (UTC + 7)

Như Thanh is a former district (huyện) of Thanh Hóa province in the North Central Coast region of Vietnam.

As of 2018 the district had a population of 95,360. The district covers an area of 586 km^{2} (226 sq mi). The district capital lies at Bến Sung.
