= Frank Palmos =

Australian journalist and translator

Francis "Frank" Palmos (born 20 January 1940 in Melbourne, Victoria) is a journalist, author, and translator, who is best known for his work in South East Asia.

== Education ==
Higher education 2008–2012: University of Western Australia, Asian Studies, Ph.D. Subject of Ph.D. Thesis: "Surabaya 1945: Sacred Territory - Revolutionary Surabaya as the birthplace of Indonesian Independence." Dissertation approved 13 March 2012. 1967: Diploma Linguistics, Sorbonne designated course, Bescancon, France. 1964: Diploma of Arts (Journalism and Indonesian Studies), University of Melbourne. 1962: University of Indonesia, Jakarta, the History of Indonesian Literature. 1961: Pajajaran University, Bandung, Indonesia, Publisistiks (Media Studies). 1961–1962: Fellow, UN Supervised Yayasan Siswa Lokantara, Indonesia.

== Career ==
Frank Palmos began his career as a foreign correspondent after six years in journalism by writing his first foreign reports from Indonesia in 1961 when he was 21 years old. Following graduation in journalism and Indonesian studies from University of Melbourne while senior journalist at Herald Melbourne, and after graduation he was appointed at 24 years of age Australia's youngest foreign correspondent to South East Asia (1964). He founded the first foreign newspaper bureau in the Republic of Indonesia in Jakarta (non-wire service) and served as its bureau chief for the Sydney Morning Herald-Sun groups, which represented 10 Australian and numerous overseas daily newspapers. Dean of foreign correspondents, co-founder and president of the Djakarta Foreign Correspondents Club, 1965–1969. Special writer for The New York Times, The Washington Post, The Economist, London, the Groene Amsterdammer, Vrij Nederland. BBC Panorama 1968. Honorary, simultaneous translator to first Indonesian president Sukarno and political party leaders, 1964–66.

In addition to his work in Southeast Asia, Palmos reported on NASA missions from Cape Kennedy and Houston between 1971 and 1973, during Apollo missions 15 (July 1971) 16 (April 1972).

== War correspondent ==
Palmos served as a war correspondent during the Vietnam War, where he did five tours between 1965 and 1968. While reporting he accompanied 33 land sea and air missions from bases in Da Nang, Saigon and Nha Trang. He was the sole survivor of a Viet Cong ambush of five western war correspondents in Cholon on 5 May 1968 during the second Tet Offensive. He documented his missions, the ambush and two-year investigative search reports between 1988 and 1990 in his autobiography, called Ridding the Devils. It was the first Western book on the Vietnam war to be translated into Vietnamese by Phan Thanh Hao and broadcast as serial over Vietnam National Radio between 1990 and 1991.

Later, Palmos served as a foundation trustee for the Indochina Media Memorial Foundation and was a contributor to the book Requiem (Random House 1997) edited by Horst Faas and Tim Page, as a memorial to 135 photographers and correspondents killed in the Indochina wars ending in 1975.

== Awards ==
Australian Winston Churchill Fellow (1971–1972) for Pioneering Journalism in Asia. Television Journalism Logie winner 1974 with Current Affair Channel 9 team, coverages included Cyclone Tracy (Camera: Kevin Wiggins) and four highlight films. Executive producer Michael Schildberger (1938–2010), Producer Graham Coddington, co-reporter John Hounslow (1946–2010), Research Andrea Lee-Steere, GTV9 Studios, Richmond, Victoria.

== Translations ==
Palmos wrote the English version of Bao Ninh's war novel, The Sorrow of War. It was named Best Foreign Book 1994 by the London-based Society of Authors. It was ranked by the society as one of 50 Best Translations of the 20th Century.

Between 2007 and 2011, Palmos translated four key Indonesian revolutionary histories: Soewito, Dr Irna Hadi: Rakyat Jawa Timur Mempertahankan Kemerdekaan: The East Javanese People's Defense of Their Freedom, Volume I (Grasindo Jakarta 1994), Abdulgani, Ruslan: Seratus Hari Di Surabaya Yang Menggemparkan Indonesia: One Hundred Days in Surabaya that Shook Indonesia (Jakarta Agung Offset, 1995), Padmodiwiryo, General (Purnawarman) Suhario: Memoar Hario Kecik: Autobiografi Seorang Mahasiswa Prajurit: Hario Kecik's Memoir, The Autobiography of a Student Soldier (Yayasan Obor Indonesia, Jakarta 1995), Armed Forces History and Traditions Editors, Pertempuran Surabaya: The Battle for Surabaya (Balai Pustaka, Jakarta 1998).

== Books ==
- "Indonesia 1976–78" with Pat Price, (ISBN 0959853200, Palmii Publishing, Melbourne 1978).
- Ridding the Devils (Sydney : Bantam, 1990), Vietnamese Edition 'Thoat Khoi Tu Than', translated by Pham Thanh Hao,(Red River, Hanoi 1991)
- "The Sorrow of War", English Version by Frank Palmos of the war novel by Bao Ninh, original translation by Phan Thanh Hao (Martin Secker & Warburg, London 1993), winner The Independent Best Foreign Book 1994, Listed Best 50 Translations of 20th Century (Society of Authors, London, 2010).
- The Vietnam Press: The Unrealized Ambition (Mount Lawley, W.A.: Centre for Asian Communication, Media and Cultural Studies, Edith Cowan University, 1995)
- "Surabaya 1945: Sacred Territory," history of the first days of the Indonesian Republic, 2012, original manuscript presented to the Governor of East Java 10 November 2011, stored as 'National Archival and Cultural Treasure' ('Jawa Pos', 8,9,10 November 2011).
- "Surabaya 1945: Sacred Territory, The First Days of the Indonesian Republic," (PhD manuscript, University of Western Australia, Perth, 2011–2012)
- Revolution in the City of Heroes (Suhario Kecik's Diary of the 1945 Battle for Surabaya: Translated), Singapore National University Press, 2015
- Surabaya Bertempur: Indonesian language history of the foundation of the Indonesian Republic, JP Books, Surabaya, 2015.
- Student Soldiers: Enhanced translation of General Suhario Padmodiwiryo's "Diary of a Student Soldier" Obor Indonesia Publishing, 2015
- Surabaya 1945: Sakral Tanahku, the founding of the Indonesian Republic, Obor Indonesia publishing.

== Personal life ==
Frank Palmos married Pat Price in 1967 in London. They had two children: Jay (born 1969, Singapore) and Sirie (born 1973, Melbourne). They divorced in 1977. He married Alison Puchy in 1982 in Melbourne. They had two children: Anna (born 1984, Melbourne) and Lachlan (born 1989, Perth).
