= Như Xuân district =

Coordinates: 19.583°N 105.417°E

Như Xuân District Huyện Như Xuân
- District
- Interactive map of Như Xuân District
- Country: Vietnam
- Region: North Central Coast
- Province: Thanh Hóa
- Capital: Yên Cát

Area
  - Total: 330 sq mi (860 km^{2})

Population (2018)
  - Total: 72,000
- Time zone: UTC+7 (UTC + 7)

Nhu Xuan (Vietnamese: Như Xuân) is a former district (huyện) of Thanh Hóa province in the North Central Coast region of Vietnam.

As of 2018 the district had a population of 72,000. The district covers an area of 860 km^{2} (330 sq mi). The district capital lies at Yên Cát.

== Climate ==
Climate data for Như Xuân
Month	Jan	Feb	Mar	Apr	May	Jun	Jul	Aug	Sep	Oct	Nov	Dec	Year
Record high °C (°F)	32.9 (91.2)	36.3 (97.3)	38.2 (100.8)	41.0 (105.8)	41.9 (107.4)	41.8 (107.2)	41.0 (105.8)	39.7 (103.5)	38.5 (101.3)	39.5 (103.1)	36.0 (96.8)	34.5 (94.1)	41.9 (107.4)
Mean daily maximum °C (°F)	20.5 (68.9)	20.8 (69.4)	23.5 (74.3)	27.9 (82.2)	32.2 (90.0)	33.9 (93.0)	33.7 (92.7)	32.3 (90.1)	30.8 (87.4)	28.6 (83.5)	25.5 (77.9)	22.1 (71.8)	27.7 (81.9)
Daily mean °C (°F)	16.9 (62.4)	17.8 (64.0)	20.2 (68.4)	23.9 (75.0)	27.3 (81.1)	29.0 (84.2)	28.9 (84.0)	28.0 (82.4)	26.6 (79.9)	24.4 (75.9)	21.4 (70.5)	18.1 (64.6)	23.5 (74.3)
Mean daily minimum °C (°F)	14.7 (58.5)	16.0 (60.8)	18.2 (64.8)	21.4 (70.5)	24.1 (75.4)	25.6 (78.1)	25.6 (78.1)	25.1 (77.2)	24.0 (75.2)	21.8 (71.2)	18.6 (65.5)	15.4 (59.7)	20.9 (69.6)
Record low °C (°F)	3.1 (37.6)	6.1 (43.0)	6.9 (44.4)	12.0 (53.6)	16.9 (62.4)	18.9 (66.0)	21.2 (70.2)	21.7 (71.1)	17.2 (63.0)	13.5 (56.3)	8.7 (47.7)	3.8 (38.8)	3.1 (37.6)
Average precipitation mm (inches)	28.4 (1.12)	20.5 (0.81)	40.3 (1.59)	61.1 (2.41)	152.2 (5.99)	166.7 (6.56)	183.5 (7.22)	284.6 (11.20)	368.2 (14.50)	268.9 (10.59)	90.5 (3.56)	26.8 (1.06)	1,676.6 (66.01)
Average rainy days	9.9	11.2	13.0	11.6	13.1	12.2	12.0	15.6	14.6	12.1	7.9	6.6	139.9
Average relative humidity (%)	87.1	88.7	89.6	88.8	83.4	80.0	80.7	85.8	86.9	84.8	83.6	83.8	85.2
Mean monthly sunshine hours	61.7	54.6	52.3	103.8	177.8	188.3	180.3	155.4	144.2	128.1	113.8	90.5	1,444.5
Source: Vietnam Institute for Building Science and Technology
