= Nghi Sơn (town) =

Coordinates: 19.417°N 105.750°E

Nghi Sơn Tĩnh Gia
- District-level town (Class-4)
- Nghi Sơn Town; Thị xã Nghi Sơn
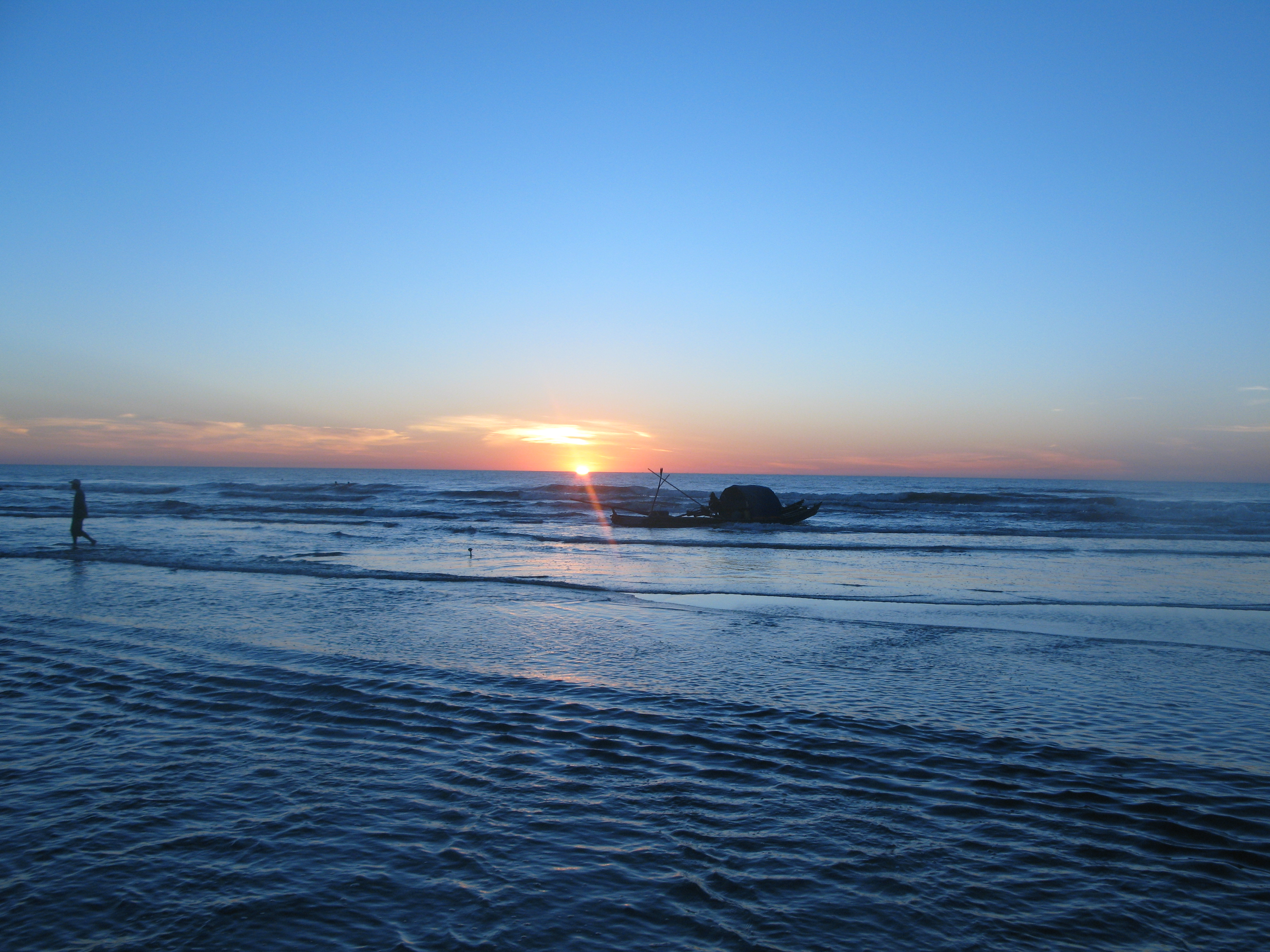
- Hải Hòa Beach
- /0/queryThe property query is required; /0/idsThe property ids is required; /0Failed to match at least one schema; /0/titleThe property title is required; /0/serviceDoes not have a value in the enumeration ["page"]; /0Failed to match exactly one schema; /0/geometriesThe property geometries is required; /0/typeDoes not have a value in the enumeration ["GeometryCollection"]; /0/typeDoes not have a value in the enumeration ["MultiPolygon"]; /0/typeDoes not have a value in the enumeration ["Point"]; /0/typeDoes not have a value in the enumeration ["MultiPoint"]; /0/typeDoes not have a value in the enumeration ["LineString"]; /0/typeDoes not have a value in the enumeration ["MultiLineString"]; /0/typeDoes not have a value in the enumeration ["Polygon"]; /0/coordinatesThe property coordinates is required; /0/geometryThe property geometry is required; /0/typeDoes not have a value in the enumeration ["Feature"]; /0/featuresThe property features is required; /0/typeDoes not have a value in the enumeration ["FeatureCollection"]
- Country: Vietnam
- Region: North Central Coast
- Province: Thanh Hóa
- Seat: Hải Hòa

Area
  - District-level town (Class-4): 175.91 sq mi (455.61 km^{2})
  - Urban: 70.76 sq mi (183.28 km^{2})

Population (2019)
  - District-level town (Class-4): 307,304
  - Density: 1,746.9/sq mi (674.49/km^{2})
  - Urban: 195,052
  - Urban density: 2,756.3/sq mi (1,064.2/km^{2})
- Time zone: UTC+7 (UTC + 7)

Nghi Sơn is a former district-level town (thị xã) of Thanh Hóa province in the North Central Coast region of Vietnam.

Nghi Sơn was formerly Tĩnh Gia District, a rural district of Thanh Hóa Province, with its district capital lying at Tĩnh Gia township. On April 22, 2020, Tĩnh Gia District was dissolved to form the new district-level town of Nghi Sơn.

As of 2019 the town had a population of 307,304. The town covers an area of 455.61 km^{2} (175.91 sq mi). The town seat lies at Hải Hòa (former Tĩnh Gia township).

Nghi Sơn Town is subdivided to 31 commune-level subdivisions, including 16 wards (phường) of: Bình Minh, Hải An, Hải Bình, Hải Châu, Hải Hòa, Hải Lĩnh, Hải Ninh, Hải Thanh, Hải Thượng, Mai Lâm, Nguyên Bình, Ninh Hải, Tân Dân, Tĩnh Hải, Trúc Lâm, Xuân Lâm and 15 rural communes (xã) of: Anh Sơn, Các Sơn, Định Hải, Hải Hà, Hải Nhân, Hải Yến, Nghi Sơn, Ngọc Lĩnh, Phú Lâm, Phú Sơn, Tân Trường, Thanh Sơn, Thanh Thủy, Trường Lâm, Tùng Lâm.

== Climate ==
Climate data for Tĩnh Gia, Nghi Sơn District
Month	Jan	Feb	Mar	Apr	May	Jun	Jul	Aug	Sep	Oct	Nov	Dec	Year
Record high °C (°F)	34.2 (93.6)	36.4 (97.5)	38.2 (100.8)	43.9 (111.0)	44.1 (111.4)	42.0 (107.6)	42.2 (108.0)	40.1 (104.2)	38.3 (100.9)	35.1 (95.2)	35.5 (95.9)	30.8 (87.4)	44.1 (111.4)
Mean daily maximum °C (°F)	20.1 (68.2)	20.5 (68.9)	22.7 (72.9)	27.0 (80.6)	31.4 (88.5)	33.6 (92.5)	33.6 (92.5)	32.3 (90.1)	30.6 (87.1)	28.3 (82.9)	25.3 (77.5)	21.9 (71.4)	27.3 (81.1)
Daily mean °C (°F)	17.1 (62.8)	17.8 (64.0)	20.0 (68.0)	23.7 (74.7)	27.5 (81.5)	29.4 (84.9)	29.5 (85.1)	28.5 (83.3)	27.1 (80.8)	24.8 (76.6)	21.8 (71.2)	18.5 (65.3)	23.8 (74.8)
Mean daily minimum °C (°F)	15.1 (59.2)	16.0 (60.8)	18.2 (64.8)	21.6 (70.9)	24.6 (76.3)	26.4 (79.5)	26.5 (79.7)	25.7 (78.3)	24.5 (76.1)	22.4 (72.3)	19.3 (66.7)	16.1 (61.0)	21.4 (70.5)
Record low °C (°F)	3.0 (37.4)	6.8 (44.2)	7.8 (46.0)	12.7 (54.9)	16.6 (61.9)	19.5 (67.1)	21.6 (70.9)	21.3 (70.3)	17.1 (62.8)	15.0 (59.0)	9.7 (49.5)	4.3 (39.7)	3.0 (37.4)
Average precipitation mm (inches)	38.7 (1.52)	36.3 (1.43)	49.1 (1.93)	59.1 (2.33)	134.8 (5.31)	139.4 (5.49)	172.7 (6.80)	268.5 (10.57)	449.4 (17.69)	352.9 (13.89)	96.4 (3.80)	33.6 (1.32)	1,841.4 (72.50)
Average rainy days	10.7	12.3	14.6	11.3	10.6	9.3	10.4	14.6	14.7	13.3	8.8	6.7	138.3
Average relative humidity (%)	87.1	89.3	90.6	89.3	84.0	79.2	79.4	83.8	86.0	84.7	82.9	82.8	84.9
Mean monthly sunshine hours	72.8	54.2	61.1	119.4	204.7	199.7	212.9	181.2	163.4	160.3	122.8	102.9	1,649.9
Source: Vietnam Institute for Building Science and Technology
