= Trần Vũ =

Trần Vũ (Saigon 2 October 1962) is a Vietnamese-language writer living in France.

Vũ arrived in Paris via a boat people camp in the Philippines at the age of seventeen in 1979. His first collection of six novelles was translated into French and published as Sous une pluie d'epines by Flammarion in 1998.

== Selected works ==
- Cái Chết Sau Quá Khứ - stories (The Death Behind the Past, California: Hồng Lĩnh, 1993)
- Ngôi Nhà Sau Lưng Văn Miếu - stories (The House Behind the Temple of Literature, California: Thời Văn, 1989; Hồng Lĩnh 1994)
