= Phan Nhiên Hạo =

Vietnamese poet and translator

- Born: Vietnam
- Occupations: Poet, writer

Phan Nhiên Hạo is a Vietnamese poet and translator, living in the United States.

He was born in Vietnam, came to the US in 1991 and now lives in Illinois. He has a BA in Vietnamese Literature from Ho Chi Minh City Pedagogical University, a BA in American Literature from UCLA, a MLIS in Library Science, also from UCLA, and a MA in Anthropology from Northern Illinois University. He is the author of three collections of poems written in Vietnamese: Radio Mùa Hè [Summer Radio], (Nhân Ảnh, 2020), Chế Tạo Thơ Ca 99-04 [Manufacturing Poetry 99-04], (Văn, 2004), and Thiên Đường Chuông Giấy [Paradise of Paper Bells], (Tân Thư, 1998). His poems have been translated into English and published in many literary journals and anthologies. His collection of poems, Paper Bells, translated by the poet Hai-Dang Phan, (The Song Cave, 2020), was listed among the ten books of the PEN America Literary Awards Longlists for poetry in translation 2021. He is also the founder and editor of the online literary magazine litviet.
