= Linh Dinh =

American writer and photographer

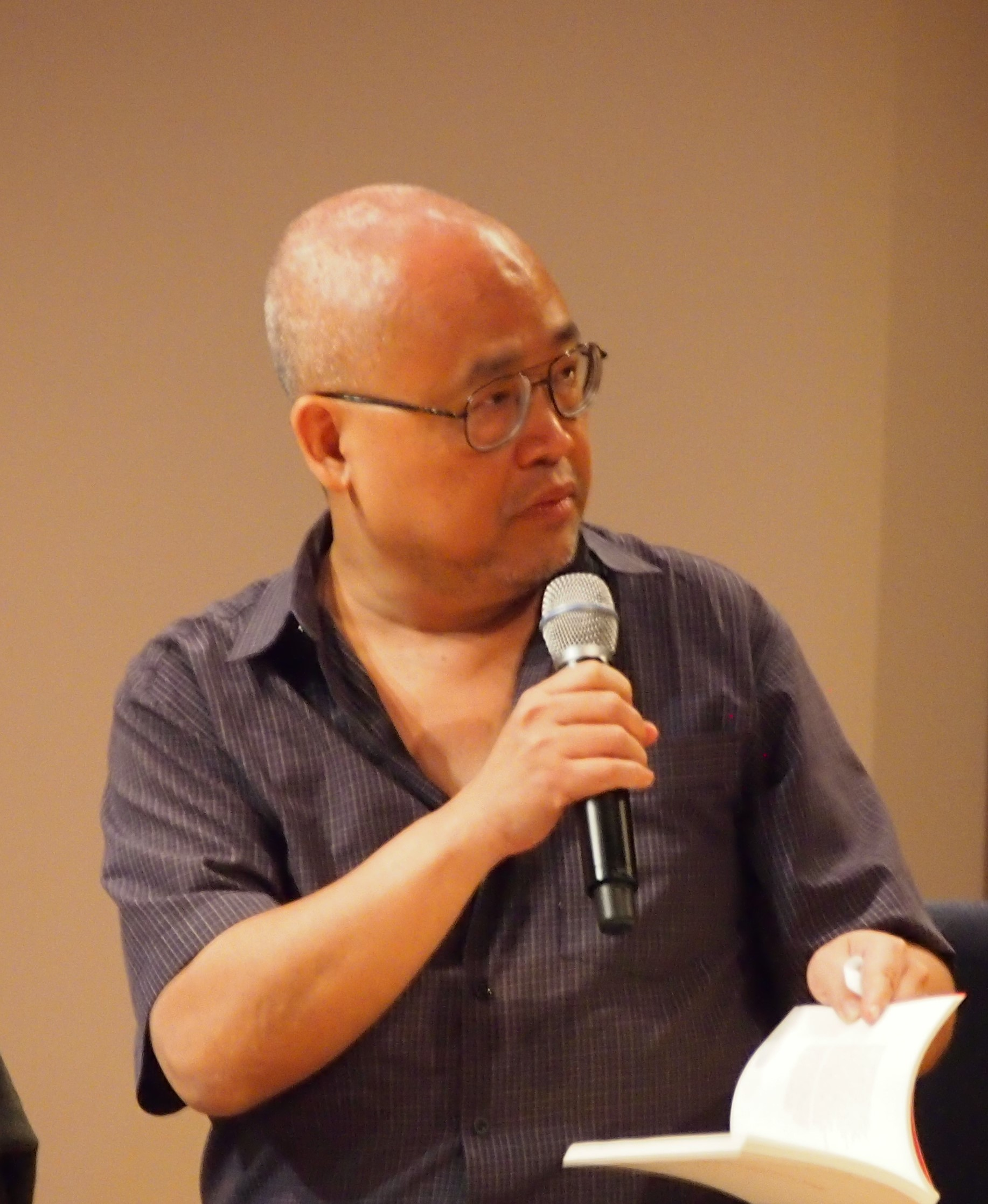
- Linh Dinh, reading at the Asian American Literature Festival, Washington, D.C (27 July 2017)
- Born: 1963 (age 62–63); Saigon, South Vietnam (present-day Vietnam)
- Writing career
- Genre: poetry
- Notable awards: Pew Fellowship

Linh Dinh (Vietnamese: Đinh Linh, born 1963, Saigon, South Vietnam) is a Vietnamese-American poet, fiction writer, translator, and photographer. He posts travel essays and social commentary regularly in his newsletter Postcards from the End.

He was a 1993 Pew Fellow.

== Biography ==
Dinh came to the US in 1975, lived mostly in Philadelphia. Since 2018, he has lived mostly in Southeast Asia, but also in Europe and Africa.

In 2005, he was a David Wong fellow at the University of East Anglia, in Norwich, England. He spent 2002–2003 in Italy as a guest of the International Parliament of Writers and the town of Certaldo.

He was a visiting faculty member at University of Pennsylvania. From 2015 to 2016, Dinh was the Picador Guest Professor for Literature at the University of Leipzig's Institute for American Studies in Leipzig, Germany.

== Career ==
He is the author of two story collections, Fake House and Blood and Soap, and five books of poems: All Around What Empties Out, American Tatts, Borderless Bodies, Jam Alerts, and Some Kind of Cheese Orgy. His first novel, Love Like Hate, was published in October 2010 and won the Balcones Fiction Prize.

His work has been anthologized in Best American Poetry 2000, Best American Poetry 2004, The Best American Poetry 2007, and Great American Prose Poems from Poe to the Present. The Village Voice picked his Blood and Soap as one of the best books of 2004. Translated into Italian by Giovanni Giri, it is published in Italy as Elvis Phong è Morto.

Dinh contributed occasional columns to the commentary site Unz Review before leaving due to disagreements. He now has a Substack page.

== Works ==
=== Poetry ===
- Some Kind of Cheese Orgy, Chax Press, 2009, ISBN 978-0-925904-78-2
- Jam Alerts, Chax Press, 2007, ISBN 9780925904683
- Lĩnh Đinh Chích Khoái, (Nhà xuất bản Giấy Vụn, Sài Gòn, 11.2007)
- Borderless Bodies, poetry (Factory School, 2006)
- American Tatts, poetry Chax Press, 2005, ISBN 978-0-925904-55-3
- All Around What Empties Out, Subpress, 2003, ISBN 978-1-930068-19-3
- Drunkard Boxing, Singing Horse Press, 1998, ISBN 978-0-935162-18-9

=== Fiction ===
- Blood and Soap, Stories. Seven Stories Press. 2004. ISBN 978-1-58322-642-1. Translated into Japanese (Hayakawa Publishing, 2008) and Italian (Spartaco, 2006), as Elvis Phong è Morto!.
- Fake House. Seven Stories Press. 2000. ISBN 978-1-58322-039-9.
- Love Like Hate, Seven Stories Press, 2010, ISBN 978-1-58322-909-5

=== Translations ===
- Night, Fish and Charlie Parker, a bilingual edition of Phan Nhiên Hạo's poetry (Tupelo, 2006)

=== Editor ===
- Contemporary Fiction from Vietnam (Seven Stories Press 1996)
- Three Vietnamese Poets, translations (Tinfish, 2001)
- Night, Again: Contemporary Fiction from Vietnam, anthology, Seven Stories, 1996, ISBN 978-1-888363-02-9

=== Anthologies ===
- Rajini Srikanth; Esther Yae Iwanaga, eds. (2001). "The Dead". Bold Words: A Century of Asian American Writing. Rutgers University Press. p. 127. ISBN 0-8135-2966-2. "Linh Dinh."
- Heather McHugh; David Lehman, eds. (2007). "Continuous Bullets over Flattened Earth; A Super-Clean Country". The Best American Poetry 2007. Simon and Schuster. ISBN 978-0-7432-9973-2.
