= Thanh Hóa province =

Province of Vietnam

Thanh Hóa
- Province
- Tỉnh Thanh Hóa 省清化
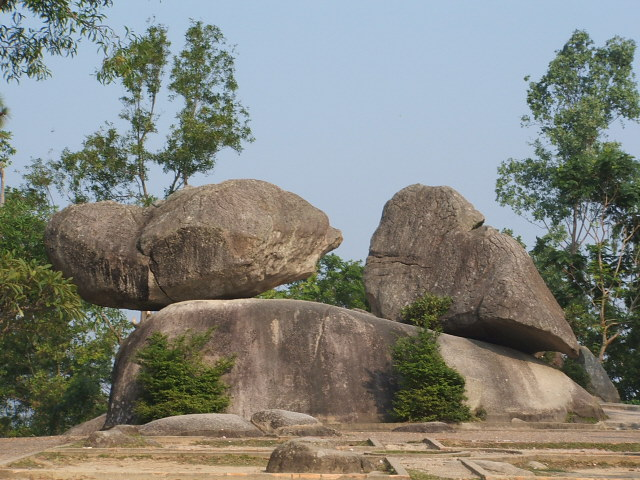
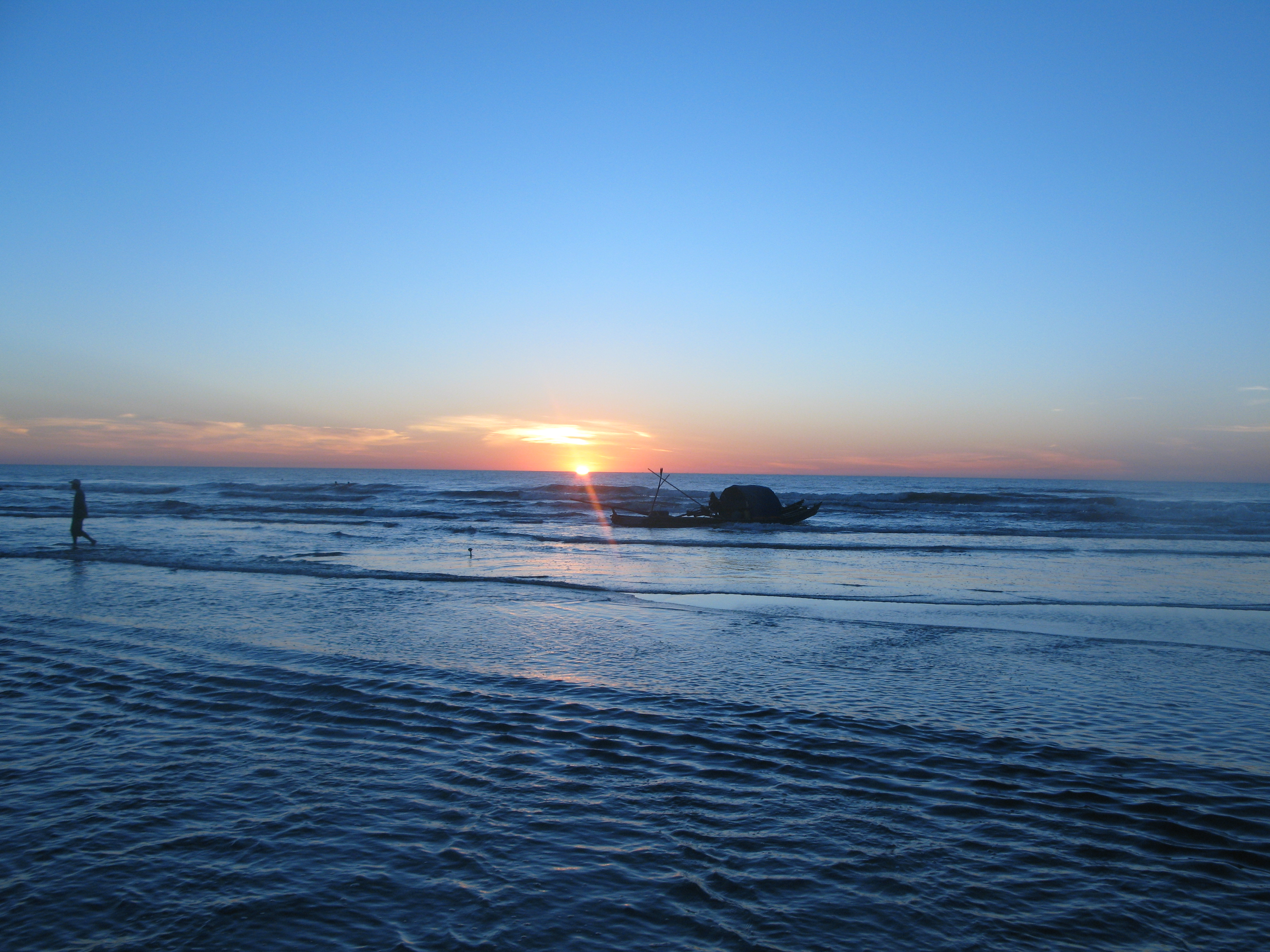
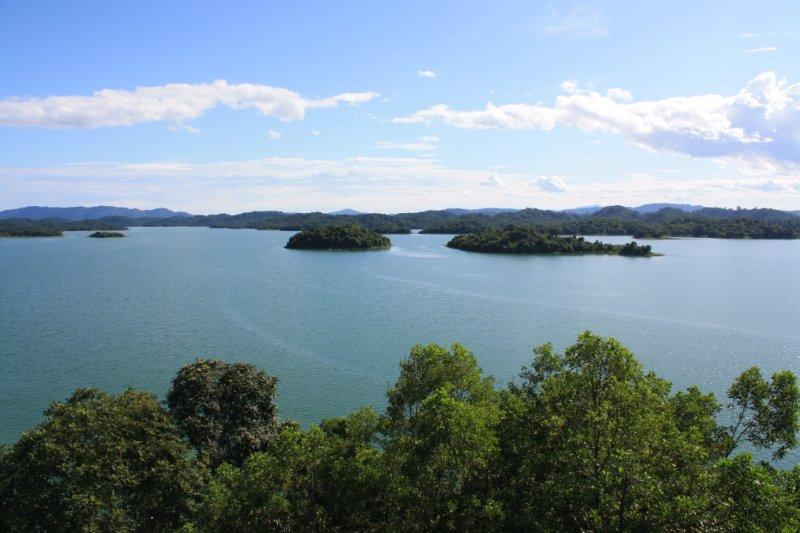
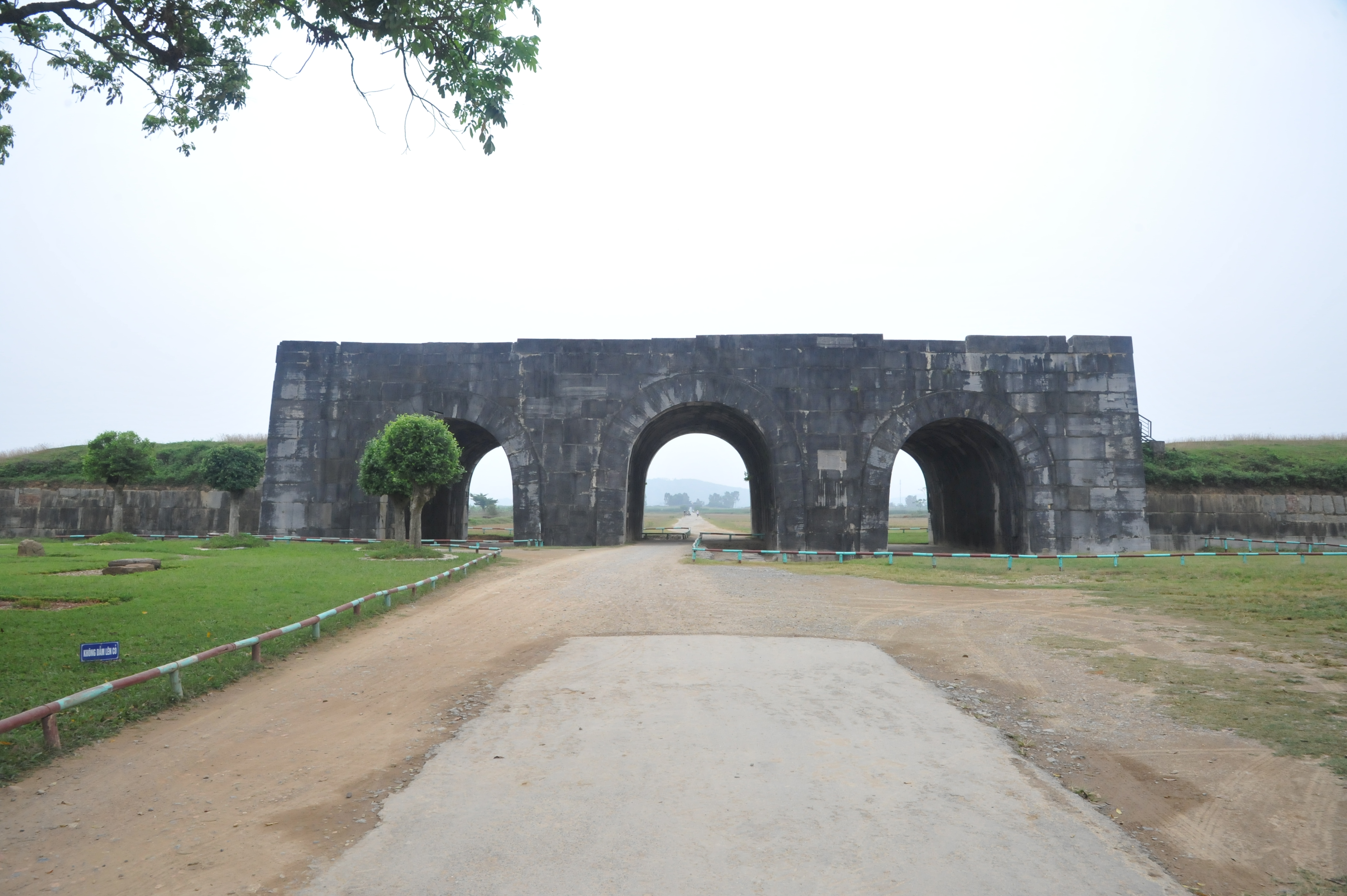
- Clockwise from top left: Trống Mái Rocks, Sầm Sơn; Hải Hòa Beach; Citadel of the Hồ Dynasty; Sông Mực Lake, Bến En National Park

- Seal
- Motto: Ý nghĩa của Biểu trưng và Khẩu hiệu du lịch Thanh Hóa (English: "Scents and colors of the four seasons")
- Location of Thanh Hóa within Vietnam
- Interactive map of Thanh Hóa
- Coordinates: 20°0′N 105°30′E
- Country: Vietnam
- Region: North Central Coast
- Capital: Hạc Thành ward

Government
  - People's Council Chair: Lại Thế Nguyên
  - People's Committee Chair: Đỗ Minh Tuấn

Area
  - Total: 11,114.71 km^{2} (4,291.41 sq mi)

Population (2025)
  - Total: 4,324,783
  - Density: 389.1044/km^{2} (1,007.776/sq mi)

Demographics
  - Ethnicities: Vietnamese, Mường, Thai, Thổ, Dao, and H'Mông

GDP
  - Total: VND 146.242 trillion US$ 6.351 billion
- Time zone: UTC+7 (ICT)
- Area codes: 237
- ISO 3166 code: VN-21
- HDI (2020): ▲0.726 (23th)
- Website: thanhhoa.gov.vn

Thanh Hóa is the northernmost coastal province in the North Central Coast region of Vietnam. It borders Sơn La, Phú Thọ, and Ninh Bình to the north, Nghệ An to the south, Laos to the west with a boundary of over 192 kilometres (119 mi) long, and the South China Sea (Gulf of Tonkin) to the east.
