= Mỹ Phú =

Mỹ Phú may refer to several places in Vietnam, including:

- Mỹ Phú, Đồng Tháp, a ward of Cao Lãnh city
- Mỹ Phú, An Giang, a commune of Châu Phú District
- Mỹ Phú, Long An, a commune of Thủ Thừa District

== See also ==
- Mỹ Phú Đông, a commune of Thoại Sơn District in An Giang Province
