= An Châu =

An Châu may refer to several places in Vietnam, including:

- An Châu, An Giang, a commune of An Giang province
- An Châu, Nghệ An, a commune of Nghệ An province
