= Vĩnh Hòa =

Vĩnh Hòa may refer to:

== Vietnam ==
- Vĩnh Hòa, An Giang, a rural commune (xã) of Tân Châu town in An Giang Province
- Vĩnh Hòa, Nha Trang, ward of Nha Trang City, Khánh Hòa province
- Vĩnh Hòa, Phú Giáo, commune in Phú Giáo, Bình Dương province
- Vĩnh Hòa, U Minh Thượng, commune in U Minh Thượng district, Kiên Giang province
- Vĩnh Hòa, Vĩnh Linh, commune in Vĩnh Linh district, Quảng Trị province
- Vĩnh Hòa, Vĩnh Lộc, commune in Vĩnh Lộc district, Thanh Hóa province
