= Vinh (disambiguation) =

Vinh is the capital of Nghệ An Province in Vietnam.

Vinh may also refer to:

== Events ==
- The Vinh wiretap, an American espionage operation of the Vietnam War

== People ==
- Monique Vinh Thuy (born 1944), widow of the last Emperor of Vietnam, Bảo Đại
- Lê Công Vinh (born 1985), Vietnamese footballer

== Places ==
- Trà Vinh Province, a province in Vietnam
- Vinh International Airport, an aviation facility in Vietnam
- Vĩnh Long, a city and the capital of Vĩnh Long Province in Vietnam
- Vĩnh Long Airfield, a United States military base
- Vịnh Mốc tunnels, tunnel complex in Vietnam
- Vĩnh Phúc Province, a province in Vietnam
- Vinh station, a railway station in Vietnam
- Vinh University, a school in Vietnam
- Vinh Stadium, a multi-use facility in Vietnam

== See also ==
- Vĩnh Bình (disambiguation)
- Vĩnh Hưng (disambiguation)
- Vinh Thanh (disambiguation)
