= Tân Thạnh =

Tân Thạnh may refer to:

- Tân Thạnh District, a rural district of Long An Province
- Tân Thạnh, Quảng Nam, a ward of Tam Kỳ
- Tân Thạnh (township), a township and capital of Tân Thạnh District
- Tân Thạnh, Kiên Giang, a commune of An Minh District
- Tân Thạnh, Bạc Liêu, a commune of Giá Rai
- Tân Thạnh, Sóc Trăng, a commune of Long Phú District
- Tân Thạnh, An Giang, a commune of Tân Châu, An Giang
- Tân Thạnh, Tiền Giang, a commune of Tân Phú Đông District
- Tân Thạnh, Đồng Tháp, a commune of Thanh Bình District
- Tân Thạnh, Cần Thơ, a commune of Thới Lai District
