= Thoại Sơn district =

Coordinates: 10.333°N 105.250°E

Thoai Son district Huyện Thoại Sơn
- District
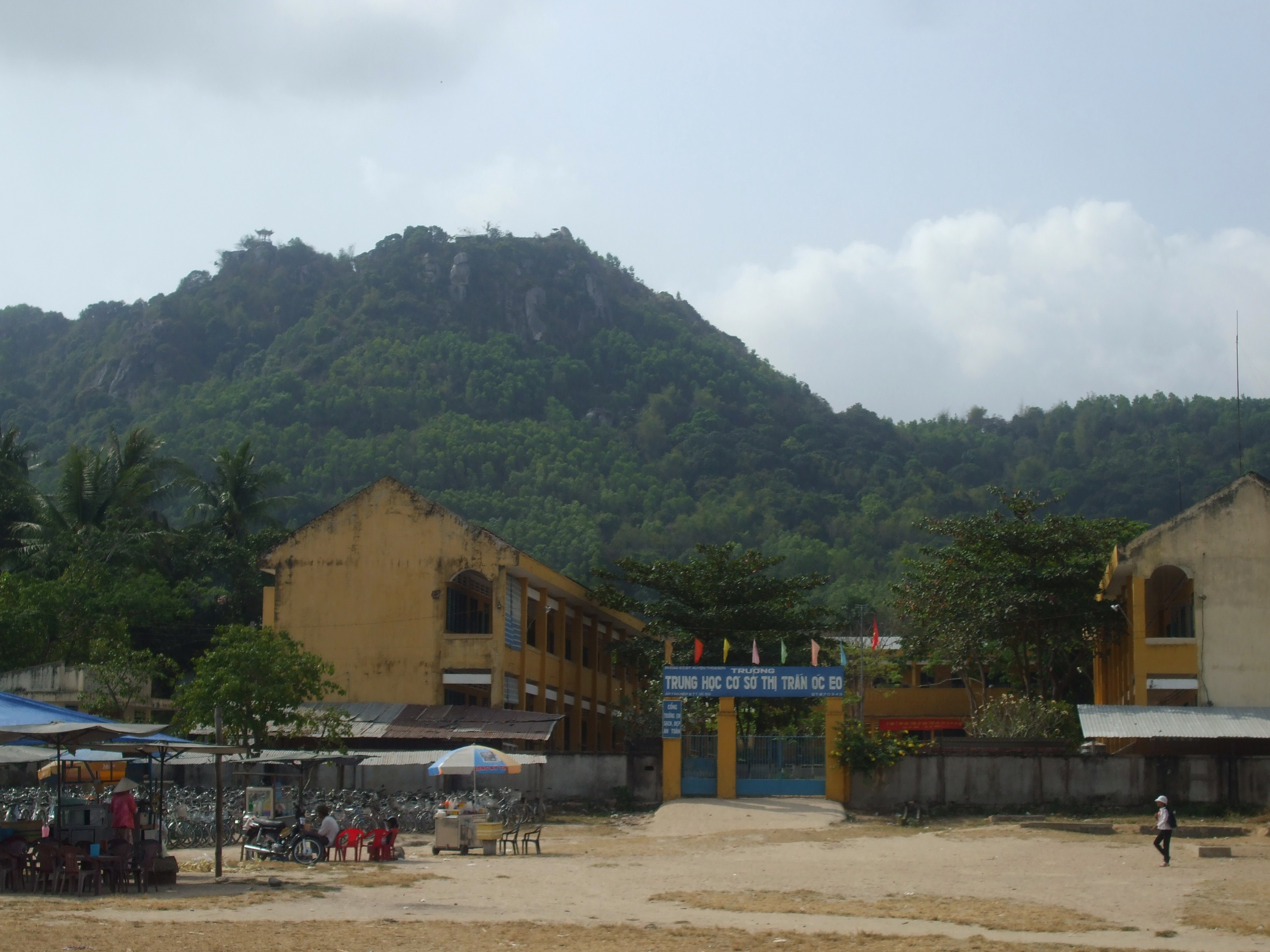
- Óc Eo

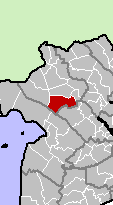
- Location in An Giang province
- Country: Vietnam
- Province: An Giang province
- Capital: Núi Sập

Area
  - District: 176 sq mi (456 km^{2})

Population (2019 census)
  - District: 163,427
  - Density: 928/sq mi (358/km^{2})
  - Urban: 40,969
- Time zone: UTC+07:00 (Indochina Time)

Thoại Sơn is a former rural district (huyện) of An Giang province in the Mekong Delta region of Vietnam.

In 2019 the district had a population of 163,427. The district covers an area of 456 km^{2} (176 sq mi). The district capital lies at Núi Sập.

The "Óc Eo" ruins of Cattara in the Kingdom of Funan is located here and they are believed to be from a trading port dating to between the 1st and 7th centuries CE. Thoại Sơn borders Châu Thành to the north, Tri Tôn to the west, Long Xuyên to the east and Kiên Giang province to the south.

The district is the location of Sap mountain, Ba mountain and the Hồ Ông Thoại tourist region.

On June 16, 2025, the Standing Committee of the National Assembly issued Resolution No. 1685/NQ-UBTVQH15. The district was dissolved and new wards were rearranged from the district.
