= Phú An =

Phú An may refer to several places in Vietnam:

- Phú An, Ho Chi Minh City, a ward of Ho Chi Minh City
- Phú An, An Giang, a commune of Phú Tân District, An Giang
- Phú An, Bình Dương, a commune of Bến Cát
- Phú An, Đồng Nai, a commune of Tân Phú District, Đồng Nai
- Phú An, Gia Lai, a commune of Đắk Pơ District
- Phú An, Hậu Giang, a commune of Châu Thành District, Hậu Giang
- Phú An, Thừa Thiên - Huế, a commune of Phú Vang District
- Phú An, Tiền Giang, a commune of Cai Lậy District
