= Vinh Thanh =

Vinh Thanh may refer to several populated places in Vietnam:

- Vĩnh Thạnh District, Cần Thơ, a rural district of Cần Thơ
- Vĩnh Thạnh District, Bình Định, a rural district of Bình Định Province

== Vĩnh Thanh ==
- Vĩnh Thanh, Kiên Giang, a ward of Rạch Giá
- Vĩnh Thanh, Bạc Liêu, a commune of Phước Long District, Bạc Liêu
- Vĩnh Thanh, Đồng Nai, a commune of Nhơn Trạch District

== Vĩnh Thành ==
- Vĩnh Thành, An Giang, a commune of Châu Thành District
- Vĩnh Thành, Bến Tre, a commune of Chợ Lách District
- Vĩnh Thành, Quảng Trị, a commune of Vĩnh Linh District
- Vĩnh Thành, Thanh Hóa, a commune of Vĩnh Lộc District
- Vĩnh Thành, Nghệ An, a commune of Yên Thành District
- Vĩnh Thành, Sóc Trăng, a commune of Thạnh Trị District

== Vĩnh Thạnh ==
- Vĩnh Thạnh, Cần Thơ, a commune of Cần Thơ
- Vĩnh Thạnh, Bình Định, a township and capital of Vĩnh Thạnh District, Bình Định Province
- Vĩnh Thạnh, Nha Trang, a commune of Nha Trang
- Vĩnh Thạnh, Kiên Giang, a commune of Giồng Riềng District
- Vĩnh Thạnh, Đồng Tháp, a commune of Lấp Vò District
- Vĩnh Thạnh, Long An, a commune of Tân Hưng District

== See also ==
- Vĩnh Thạnh Trung, a commune in Châu Phú District
