= Đông Hưng =

Đông Hưng may refer to several places in Vietnam, including:

- Đông Hưng district, a rural district of Thái Bình province
- Đông Hưng (township), a township and capital of Đông Hưng district
- Đông Hưng, Thanh Hóa, a commune of Thanh Hóa city
- Đông Hưng, Kiên Giang, a commune of An Minh district
- Đông Hưng, Cà Mau, a commune of Cái Nước district
- Đông Hưng, Bắc Giang, a commune of Lục Nam district
- Đông Hưng, Haiphong, a commune of Tiên Lãng district

== See also ==
- The rural communes of Đông Hưng A and Đông Hưng B in An Minh district, Kiên Giang province
