= U Minh Thượng district =

U Minh Thượng district Huyện U Minh Thượng
- District
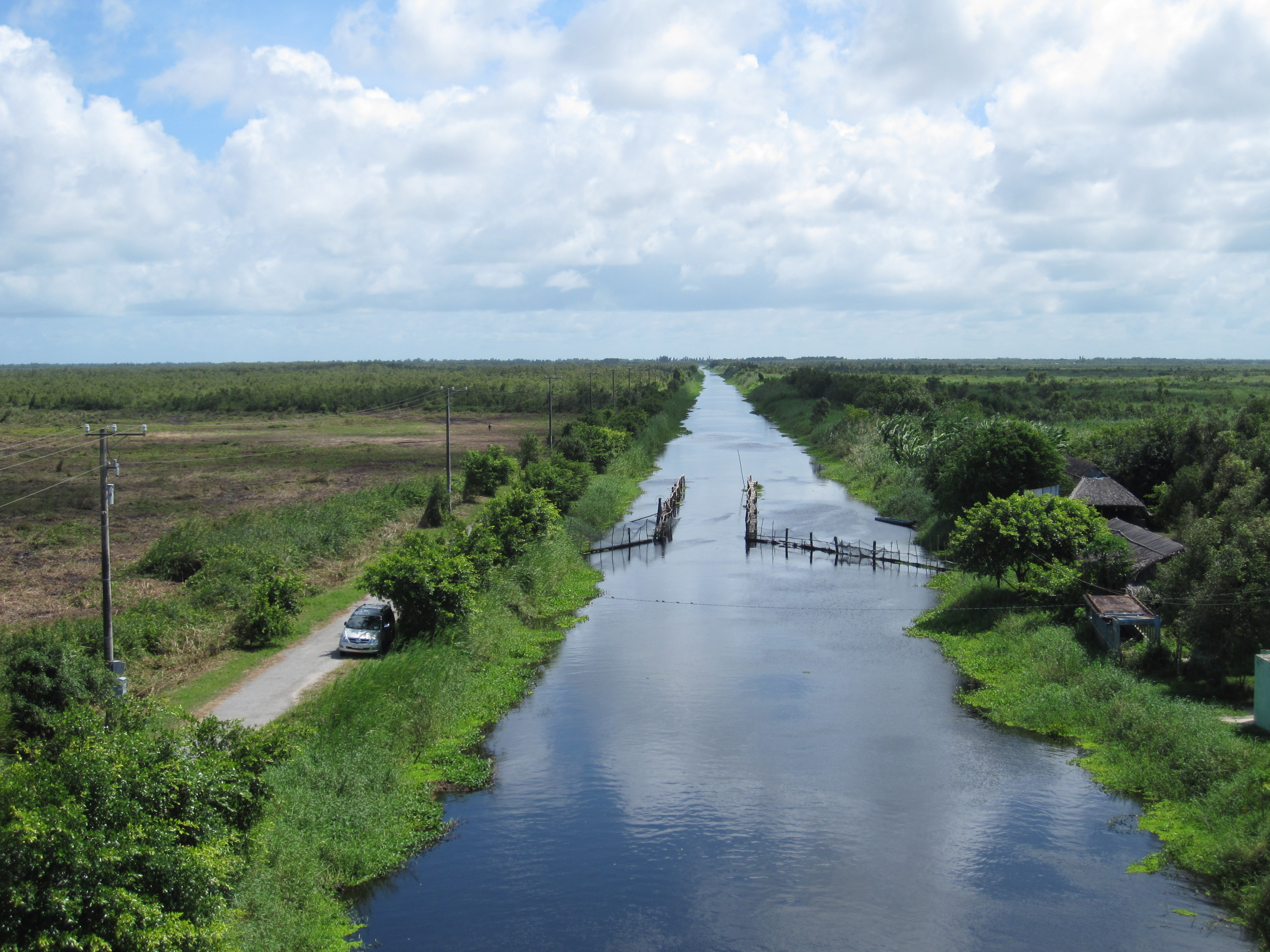
- U Minh Thuong Forest
- Country: Vietnam
- Region: Mekong Delta
- Province: Kiên Giang

Area
  - Total: 167.068 sq mi (432.703 km^{2})

Population (2019)
  - Total: 80,390
- Time zone: UTC+7 (Indochina Time)

U Minh Thượng ("Upper U Minh") is a former rural district of Kiên Giang province in Mekong Delta region of Vietnam. It was established in 2007. U Minh Thượng's area is 432.703 km^{2} (167.068 sq mi) and its population is 68,076 people. The district is divided into six communes including Thạnh Yên, Thạnh Yên A, An Minh Bắc, Minh Thuận, Vĩnh Hòa and Hòa Chánh.

U Minh Thượng is bordered with Vĩnh Thuận in the east; An Biên and An Minh in the west; Cà Mau province in the south; and Gò Quao in the north.
