= Tân Lập =

Tân Lập may refer to several places in Vietnam:

- Tân Lập, An Giang
- Tân Lập, Bắc Giang
- Tân Lập, Bắc Kạn
- Tân Lập, Nha Trang, Khánh Hòa province
