= Châu Thành district, An Giang =

Coordinates: 10°22′08″N 105°13′12″E

Châu Thành district Huyện Châu Thành
- District
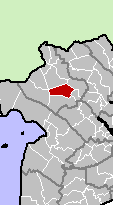
- Location in An Giang province
- Country: Vietnam
- Province: An Giang
- Capital: An Châu

Area
  - District: 134.1 sq mi (347.2 km^{2})

Population (2019 census)
  - District: 151,368
  - Density: 1,129/sq mi (436.0/km^{2})
  - Urban: 22,998
- Time zone: UTC+07:00 (Indochina Time)

Châu Thành is a district (huyện) of An Giang province in the Mekong Delta region of Vietnam.

As of 2019 the district had a population of 151,368. The district covers an area of 347 km^{2}. The district capital lies at An Châu.

It was created when the Châu Thành district was split into Châu Thành and Thoại Sơn districts, under decree 300/CP on August 23, 1979. Under South Vietnam, it was part of Long Xuyên province.

The district comprises the thị trấn An Châu (huyện lỵ) and 12 communes, which include a total of 63 hamlets. It borders four other districts, these being Tịnh Biên, Châu Phú, Chợ Mới, Thoại Sơn and the nearby city of Long Xuyên.

The terrain is flat, and is bisected by the Hậu River.

The ethnic groups in the area in order of size, are ethnic Vietnamese, Khmer Krom, Cham, and Hoa. Hòa Hảo is the most common religion in the area.
