= Khánh Hòa (disambiguation) =

Khánh Hòa is a province at the central of Vietnam.

Khánh Hoà may also refer to:

- Khánh Hòa, Sóc Trăng, a ward of Vĩnh Châu
- Khánh Hòa, An Giang, a commune of Châu Phú District
- Khánh Hòa, Yên Bái, a commune of Lục Yên District
- Khánh Hòa, Cà Mau, a commune of U Minh District
- Khánh Hòa, Ninh Bình, a commune of Yên Khánh District
