= Bình Mỹ =

Bình Mỹ may refer to several places in Vietnam:

- Bình Mỹ, Ho Chi Minh City, a commune in the former Củ Chi district
- Bình Mỹ, An Giang, a commune in the former Châu Phú district
- Bình Mỹ, Ninh Bình, a commune in the former Bình Lục district, previously a township of Hà Nam province
