= Vĩnh Trung =

Vĩnh Trung may refer to several places in Vietnam, including:

- Vĩnh Trung, Đà Nẵng, a ward of Thanh Khê District
- Vĩnh Trung, Quảng Ninh, a commune of Móng Cái
- Vĩnh Trung, Nha Trang, a commune of Nha Trang
- Vĩnh Trung, An Giang, a commune of Tịnh Biên District
- Vĩnh Trung, Hậu Giang, a commune of Vị Thủy District
- Vĩnh Trung, Quảng Trị, a commune of Vĩnh Linh District
