= Tân An =

Tân An is a name given to many places in Vietnam:

- Tân An, Cần Thơ ward, Cần Thơ city
- Tân An, Bắc Ninh ward, Bắc Ninh city
- Tân An, Đắk Lắk ward, Đắk Lắk province
- Tân An, Tây Ninh ward, Tây Ninh province
- Tân An, Haiphong commune, Haiphong city
- Tân An, Đồng Nai commune, Đồng Nai city
- Tân An, An Giang commune, An Giang province
- Tân An, Nghệ An commune, Nghệ An province
- Tân An, Tuyên Quang commune, Tuyên Quang province
- Tân An, Vĩnh Long commune, Vĩnh Long province

== Old place names ==
- Tân An (city), provincial city and capital of the former Long An province
- Tân An province, southern Vietnam (today is southern part of Tây Ninh province)
