= Long Điền =

Long Điền may refer to several places in Vietnam:

- Long Điền, Ho Chi Minh City, a commune of Ho Chi Minh City
- Long Điền, An Giang, a commune of An Giang Province
- Long Điền, Cà Mau, a commune of Cà Mau Province
- Long Điền District, a former rural district of Bà Rịa-Vũng Tàu Province
