= Vĩnh An =

Vĩnh An may refer to several places in Vietnam:

- Vĩnh An, Đồng Nai, a township and capital of Vĩnh Cửu District
- Vĩnh An, Haiphong, a rural commune of Vĩnh Bảo District
- Vĩnh An, An Giang, a rural commune of Châu Thành District
- Vĩnh An, Bắc Giang, a rural commune of Sơn Động District
- Vĩnh An, Bến Tre, a rural commune of Ba Tri District
- Vĩnh An, Bình Định, a rural commune of Tây Sơn District
- Vĩnh An, Thanh Hóa, a rural commune of Vĩnh Lộc District
