= U Minh Thượng =

Coordinates: 9°35′12″N 105°06′39″E

- Commune
- Interactive map of U Minh Thượng
- Country: Vietnam
- Region: Mekong Delta
- Province: An Giang
- Established: 16 June 2025

Area
  - Total: 286.47 km^{2} (110.61 sq mi)

Population (31 December 2024)
  - Total: 46,246
  - Density: 161/km^{2} (420/sq mi)
- Website: uminhthuong.angiang.gov.vn

U Minh Thượng is a commune in An Giang province, Vietnam.

On 12 June 2025, the National Assembly of Vietnam adopted Resolution No. 202/2025/QH15 on the reorganization of provincial-level administrative units, effective on the same date. Under the resolution, Kiên Giang province was merged into An Giang province.

On 16 June 2025, the National Assembly of Vietnam adopted Resolution No. 203/2025/QH15 amending and supplementing several articles of the Constitution of the Socialist Republic of Vietnam. Under the resolution, district-level administrative units nationwide ceased to operate from 1 July 2025.

The Standing Committee of the National Assembly of Vietnam issued Resolution No. 1654/NQ-UBTVQH15 on the arrangement of commune-level administrative units in An Giang province in 2025, effective from 16 June 2025. Under the resolution, the entire area and population of An Minh Bắc and Minh Thuận communes, formerly part of U Minh Thượng district in Kiên Giang province, were merged to form a new commune named U Minh Thượng.
