= Bảy Núi =

Mountain in Vietnam

- Thất Sơn
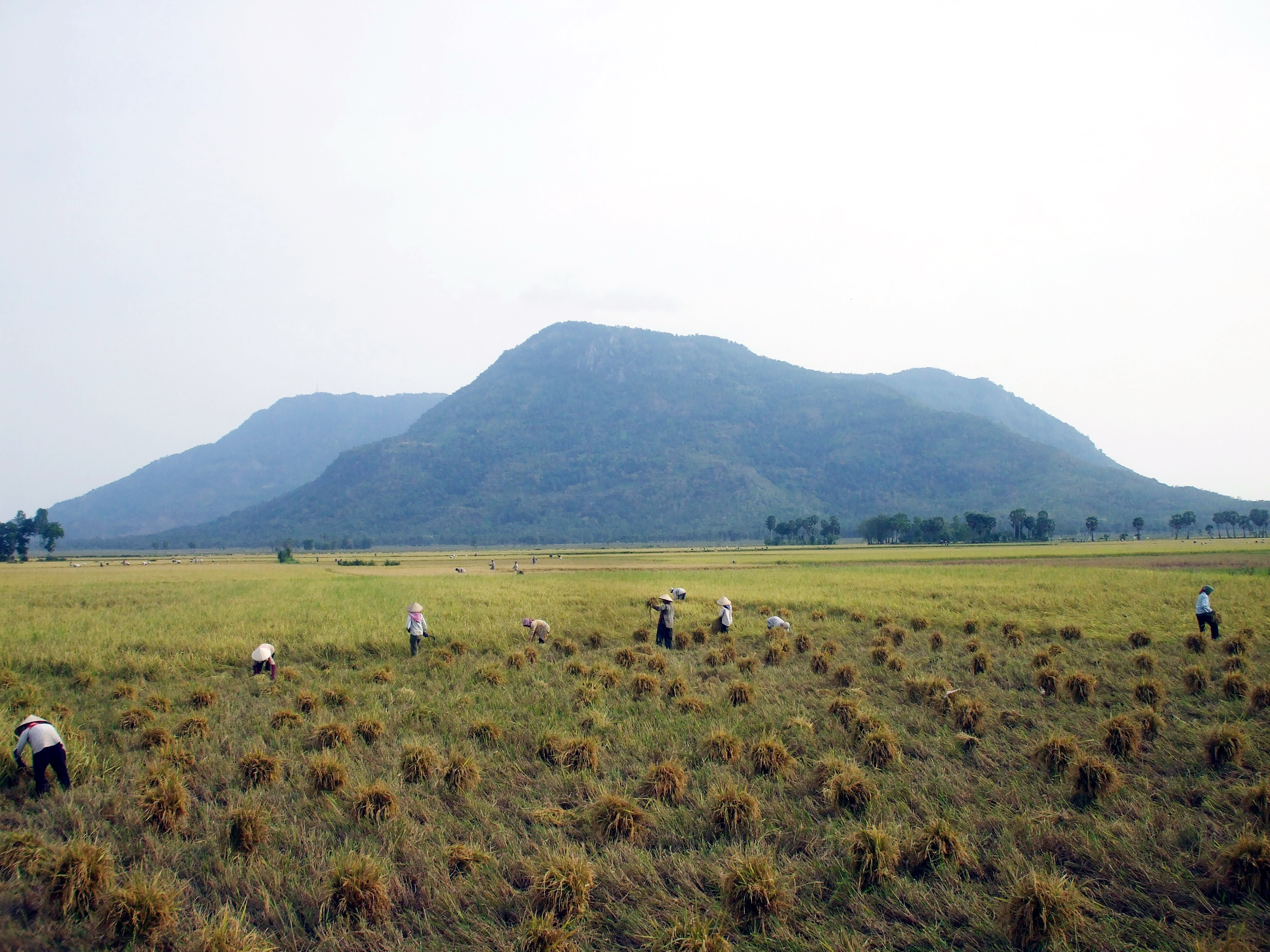
- Núi Cấm

Highest point
- Elevation: 710 m (2,330 ft)
- Listing: List of mountains in Vietnam
- Coordinates: 10°29′N 104°59′E

Geography
- Location within Vietnam
- Location: Cambodia – Vietnam border
- Parent range: Isolated hills

Climbing
- Easiest route: Drive

Bảy Núi (Vietnamese: [ɓa᷉ːj nǔj], Chữ Nôm: 罷𡶀, seven mountains), also known by the Sino-Vietnamese version Thất Sơn (Vietnamese: [tʰə́k ʂəːŋ], Chữ Hán: 七山), is a range of small mountains located in the Tri Tôn and Tịnh Biên districts in Vietnam's An Giang Province, very close to the Cambodian border.

The 710-metre Thiên Cấm Sơn (the Cấm Mountains) is the highest among the mountainous region of Thất Sơn and it is the highest peak in the whole Mekong Delta region. Endowed with such spectacular mountainous terrain, Núi Cấm is known as the "Đà Lạt of the Mekong Delta".

Before reaching the Seven Mountain, tourists have to ascend Ba The mountain. The mountain is approximately 200 meters above sea level and by the poetic Thoai Ha River, there is home to many species of monkeys, squirrels, herons, and wild birds

== Peaks ==
The common names of the seven mountains in the Thất Sơn range are:

- Núi Cấm (Thiên Cẩm Sơn) "Forbidden Mountain". The mountain is 716 meters in height and 7,500 meters in length. Cam mountain is the longest mountain in the Seven Mountains. It is the most sacred mountain in the Seven Mountains region. Cam mountain had built a path to the top of the mountain.
- Núi Dài Năm Giếng (Ngũ Hồ Sơn) "Long Five Wells Mountain" - The mountain is ranked as the fourth highest in the Seven Mountains, 265 meters above sea level in height. The West faces An Phu district. The physical features of the mountain are really rugged. However, from the top of the mountain, there is a panoramic view of Nha Bang township, and visitors also can see daily activities of Nha Bang residents
- Núi Cô Tô (Phụng Hoàng Sơn) - Cô Tô mountain is located in Tri ton district, An Giang province. The mountain is the third longest mountain in the range of Seven mountain with 5,800 meters in length and 614 meters in height. There are many visitors who enjoy walking on top of the mountain because of its length. The top of the mountain offers a view of a large lake. At twilight, especially, visitors and residents of Tri Ton enjoy the feeling of the fresh air.
- Núi Dài (Ngọa Long Sơn) "Long Mountain" - The mountain is the longest mountain in the Seven mountain, 8,000 meters in length. It is 580 meters in height. The mountain is 3 kilometers away from the central Ba Chuc which belongs to Chi Ton district. The mountain is the combination of many hard rocks such as volcanic rocks, granite rocks, Jurassic rocks.
- Núi Tượng (Liên Hoa Sơn) "Statue Mountain" - The mountain is located in the central Ba Chuc village. The mountain is 600 meters in length and 145 meters in height. It is the second smallest mountain in the Seven Mountains. Visitors can easily get lost on the way to the top of the mountain because of the winding road. Also, in the past, many illegal lumberjacks felled trees, so the trees had overgrown to fill the path.
- Núi Két (Anh Vũ Sơn) "Parrot Mountain" - The mountain is 225 meters in height with 1,100 meters in length, located 2,5 kilometers away from Nha Bang street-market. The path to the top of the mountain is uncultivated because it is a developing area, so it does not attract that many pedestrians, comparing to the other mountains. The scenery of the forest mountain still looks primitive, and it is very beautiful and unspoiled.
- Núi Nước (Thủy Đài Sơn) "Water Mountain" - This mountain is located about 2 kilometers in Ba Chuc town. Water Mountain is the smallest and lowest mountain of Seven Mountain with only 20 meters in height. The mountain is called by Water Mountain, that is because in the flood season, the mountain is often submerged in water. In the past, the mountain has been covered by water in the flood season, so the water pressure created a large force impact a large area of the mountain, so the rock on the mountain became very smooth and sparkling.

== History and Mystery of Seven Mountains ==
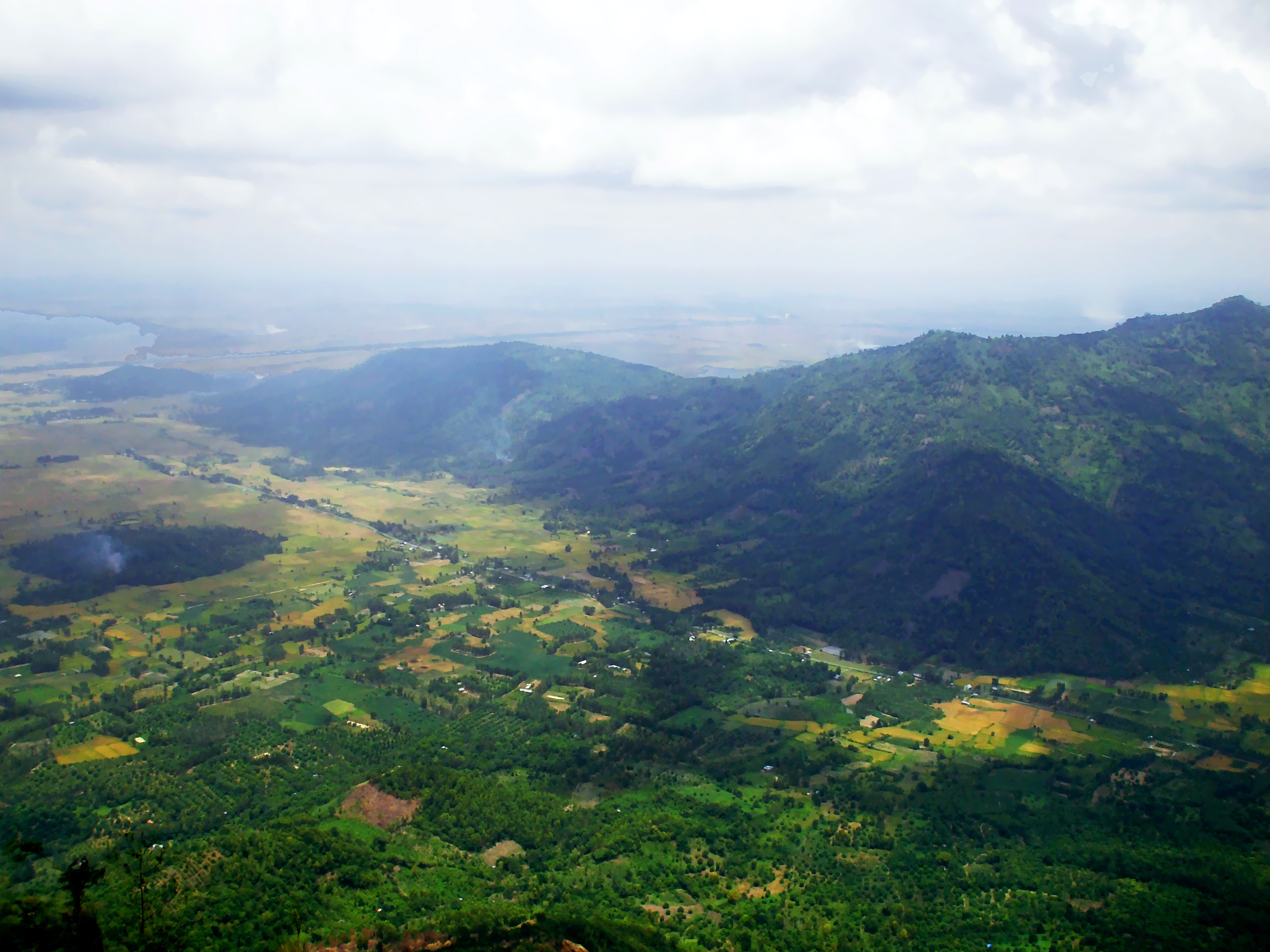
View of the That Son range from Núi Cấm

The prince Nguyễn Ánh, who later proclaimed himself the first emperor of the Nguyễn dynasty (1802–1945), sought refuge on the mountain from the Tây Sơn insurgents. Ánh forbade anyone to come to the mountain, hence its Vietnamese name meaning "forbidden mountain". Followers of the Bửu Sơn Kỳ Hương tradition, founded in An Giang in 1849, refer to these mountains as Bửu Sơn ("Precious Mountains"), since their founder, Đoàn Minh Huyên, is said to have spent time in meditation in these mountains.

The history of Thien Cam Mountain (Thiên Cẩm Sơn, "heaven's forbidden mountain") - Prince Nguyễn Ánh (later Gia Long Emperor) lost the battle who was wanted by Tây Sơn. He decided to hide in this mountain. The Mandarins had to ban people from going to the mountain with a fake reason that there were many ogres and poisonous creatures and beasts. The name of the mountain came after this event, The Forbidden Mountain.

The history of Co To Mountain - The Co To Mountain was a secret place to hide for Viet Cong soldiers in the Vietnam War. The place was covered by rock paths, wide, and narrow trail. Inside of the mountain, there was a large cave that used to call as the Tuyen Dao cave of An Giang Provincial Party Committee. The cave was used as the weapon storage, and could accommodate up to 150 people.

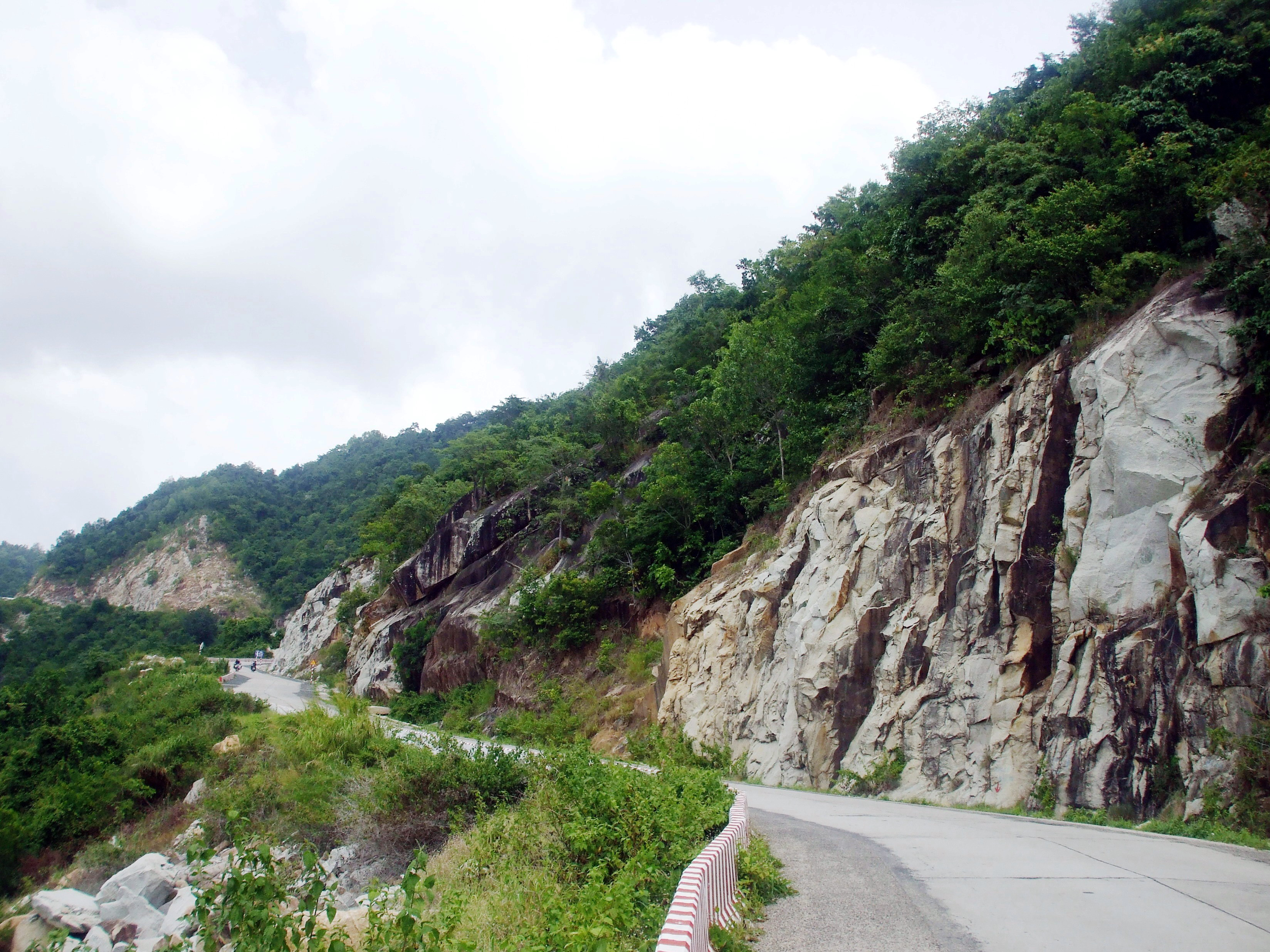
The road that leads up Núi Cấm (Forbidden Mountain)

The mystery of Dai Nam Gieng Mountain (Ngu Ho son, "Five Wells Mountain") - In the dry season, every well is always full of water mysteriously. It is because of this mystery that women and men usually come here to worship.

The history of Dai mountain -This was a dangerous forest area. Between 1962 and 1967, this place was a base of An Giang Provincial Party Committee in Vietnam War. According to the story, in 1969 a front-line platoon of 61 was bombed by enemy aircraft. The mouth of the cave collapsed. Seven soldiers were trapped in the cave. The seven soldiers used bamboo tubes to bring milk and porridge. After a few days, the unit had to leave the teammates and retreat to U Minh forest.

Ket Mountain (Anh Vũ Sơn) - According to history, in 1851, Doan Minh Huyen was a Buddha Master Tay An and his disciples went to the Ket mountain to develop the Ket Mountain. After a while, the Ket Mountain become a large and fertile lands. After they were gone, Hung Thoi and Xuan Son villages residents have continually built the land of the mountain and it became the Ket Mountain today.

Tuong Mountain - In the 1870s, Tuong Mountain was wild. Ngô Lợi was a student of Đoàn Minh Huyên who was the Tuong Mountain Keeper. He and his disciplines went to the mountain to develop a few small villages. They were called as An Dinh, An Thanh, An lap villages. He and his disciplines also built Tam Bao and Phi Lai temples. Tuong Mountain became more popular and attracted a lot of people visit

Nuoc Mountain - In 806–820, there was a gust from North Vietnam who was a discipline of Cao Bien (a Buddha Master). When he came to the Water Mountain, Cao Bien's discipline discovered a beast on Water mountain, so he used his hand to control a beast successfully and stopped the beast came out from the water. It was called Water Mountain after the event.

== Tourism ==
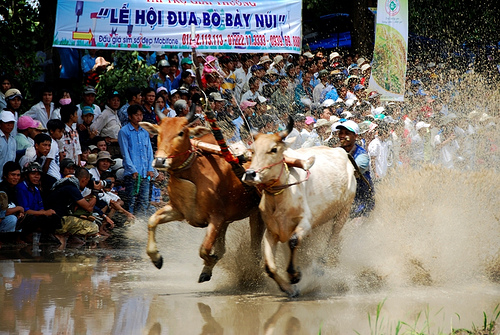
Bảy Núi bull racing festival

The mountain is commonly busy with tourists and pilgrims during the festival season, from the 4th to the 7th lunar month. About 3,000 people live on the mountain, with an average of 1,000 visitors per day.

Tourists can now visit Bà Chúa Xứ temple complex on Sam mountain, Great Buddha Pagoda and the Nui Cam Natural Reserve (Lam Vien Nui Cam), located nearby.

== Sources ==
- "The mystery of Seven Mountain (Chapter 2)". (n.d.) Seven mountain in Chau Doc. Retrieved from http://thatsonchaudoc.com/banviet2/TruyenSuuTam/DTLS_NhungHuyenThoaiKyBiVungTSCD_2.htm
- Hoang, P, H. (2015). The mysterious Seven Mountains in An Giang, Vietnam. Retrieved from https://vietnambeautifulplace.blogspot.com/2015/11/the-mysterious-seven-mountains-in-giang.html
- "Bay Nui (Seven Mountains)- The peaceful land and tranquil atmosphere". (n.d.). Vietnam tourism. Retrieved from http://www.vietnamtourism.info/destinations/mekong-river-delta/an-giang/bay-nui-seven-mountains-the-peaceful-land-and-tranquil-atmosphere.htm#.XJF28yJKiCh
- Wikipedia contributors. (2011, January 27). Co To Mountain. In Wikipedia, The Free Encyclopedia. Retrieved 6:23, March 19, 2019, from Núi_Cô_Tô
- Wikipedia contributors. (2018, May 21). Dai Mountain. In Wikipedia, The Free Encyclopedia. Retrieved 6:26, March 19, 2019, from Núi_Dài
- "Ngu Ho mountain discovery". (2011). nld. Retrieved from https://nld.com.vn/dia-phuong/kham-pha-ngu-ho-son-20111211024151502.htm
- Nguyen, B, H. (2015). Seven Mountains in That Son An Giang. Retrieved from https://znews.vn/bay-ngon-nui-trong-day-that-son-o-an-giang-post566199.html
- Wikipedia contributors. (2016, November 1). Ket Mountain. In Wikipedia, The Free Encyclopedia. Retrieved 6:32, March 19, 2019, from Núi_Két
