= Bình Hòa, An Giang =

Bình Hòa
- Rural commune
- Interactive map of Bình Hòa
- Country: Vietnam
- Province: An Giang
- Time zone: UTC+07:00 (Indochina Time)
- Climate: Aw

Bình Hòa is a rural commune (xã) of An Giang Province, Vietnam.
