= Nhơn Mỹ, An Giang =

Coordinates: 10°28′39″N 105°23′37″E

Nhơn Mỹ
- Rural commune and village
- Interactive map of Nhơn Mỹ
- Country: Vietnam
- Province: An Giang
- Time zone: UTC+07:00 (Indochina Time)

Nhơn Mỹ is a rural commune (xã) and village of An Giang Province, Vietnam.
