= Châu Phong =

- Rural commune
- Interactive map of Châu Phong
- Coordinates: 10°44′25″N 105°09′57″E
- Country: Vietnam
- Province: An Giang
- Time zone: UTC+07:00 (Indochina Time)
- Climate: Aw

Châu Phong is a rural commune (xã) of An Giang Province, Vietnam.
