= Cần Đăng =

Coordinates: 10°27′27″N 105°17′40″E

- Rural commune
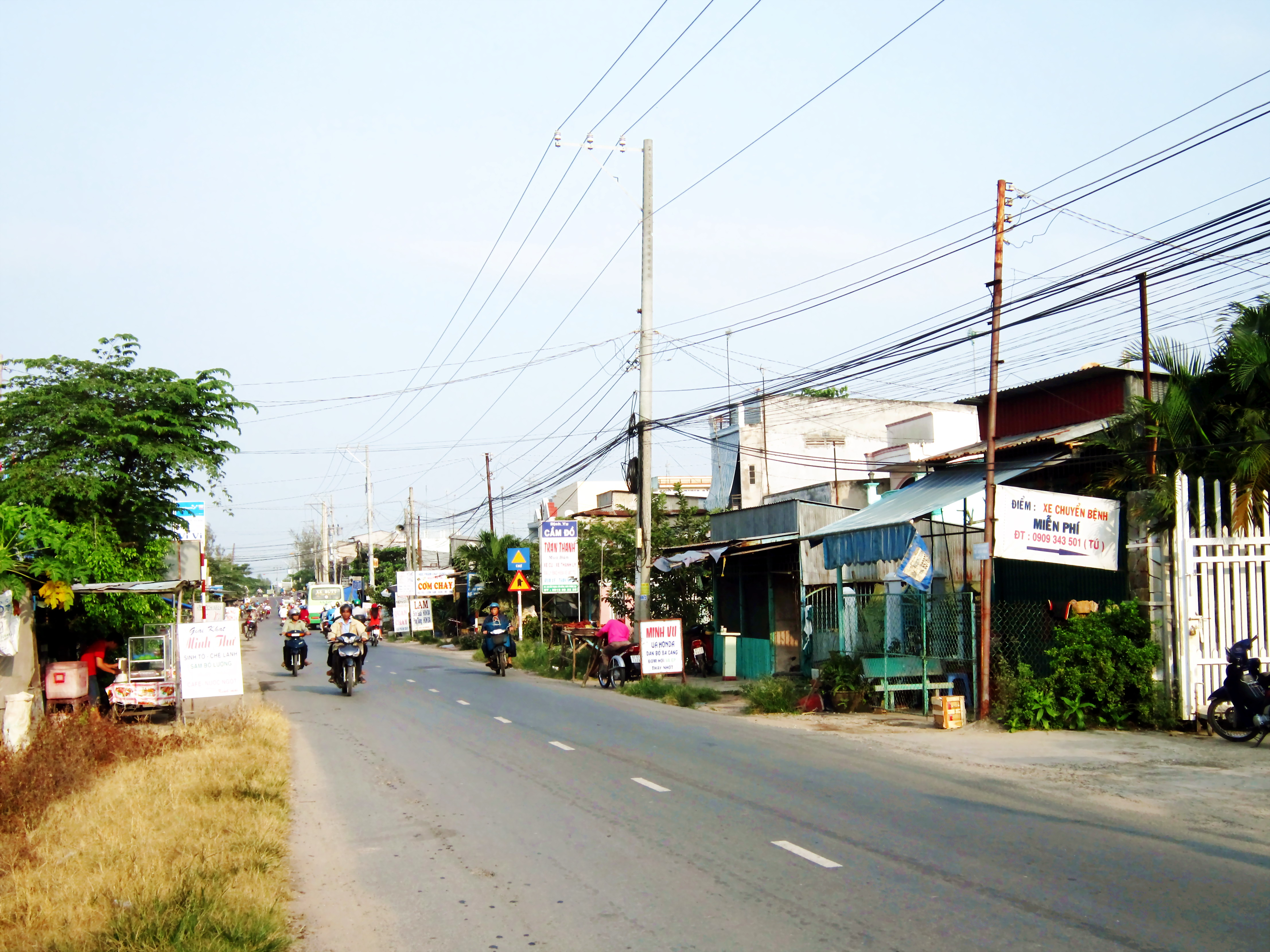
- Interactive map of Cần Đăng
- Country: Vietnam
- Province: An Giang
- Time zone: UTC+07:00 (Indochina Time)
- Climate: Aw

Cần Đăng is a rural commune (xã) of An Giang Province, Vietnam.
