= Phú Lâm, An Giang =

Rural commune and village in Vietnam

Coordinates: 10°43′47″N 105°16′27″E

Phú Lâm
- Rural commune and village
- Interactive map of Phú Lâm
- Country: Vietnam
- Province: An Giang
- Time zone: UTC+07:00 (Indochina Time)

Phú Lâm is a rural commune (xã) and village of An Giang Province, Vietnam.
