= Thạnh Mỹ Tây, An Giang =

Thạnh Mỹ Tây
- Rural commune and village
- Location in Vietnam
- Coordinates: 10°32′38″N 105°8′52″E
- Country: Vietnam
- Province: An Giang
- Time zone: UTC+07:00 (Indochina Time)
- Climate: Aw

Thạnh Mỹ Tây is a rural commune (xã) and village of An Giang Province, Vietnam.
