= Hội An, An Giang =

Rural commune and village in Vietnam

Coordinates: 10°26′45″N 105°32′22″E

Hội An Xã Hội An
- Rural commune and village
- Interactive map of Hội An
- Country: Vietnam
- Province: An Giang
- Time zone: UTC+07:00 (Indochina Time)

Hội An is a rural commune (xã) of An Giang Province, Vietnam.

In 2025, Hội An town, Hòa An commune and Hòa Bình commune were reorganized into a new commune named Hội An commune.
