= Thoại Sơn, An Giang =

Coordinates: 10°16′N 105°16′E

Thoại Sơn
- Commune
- Interactive map of Thoại Sơn
- Country: Vietnam
- Province: An Giang
- Time zone: UTC+07:00 (Indochina Time)
- Climate: Aw

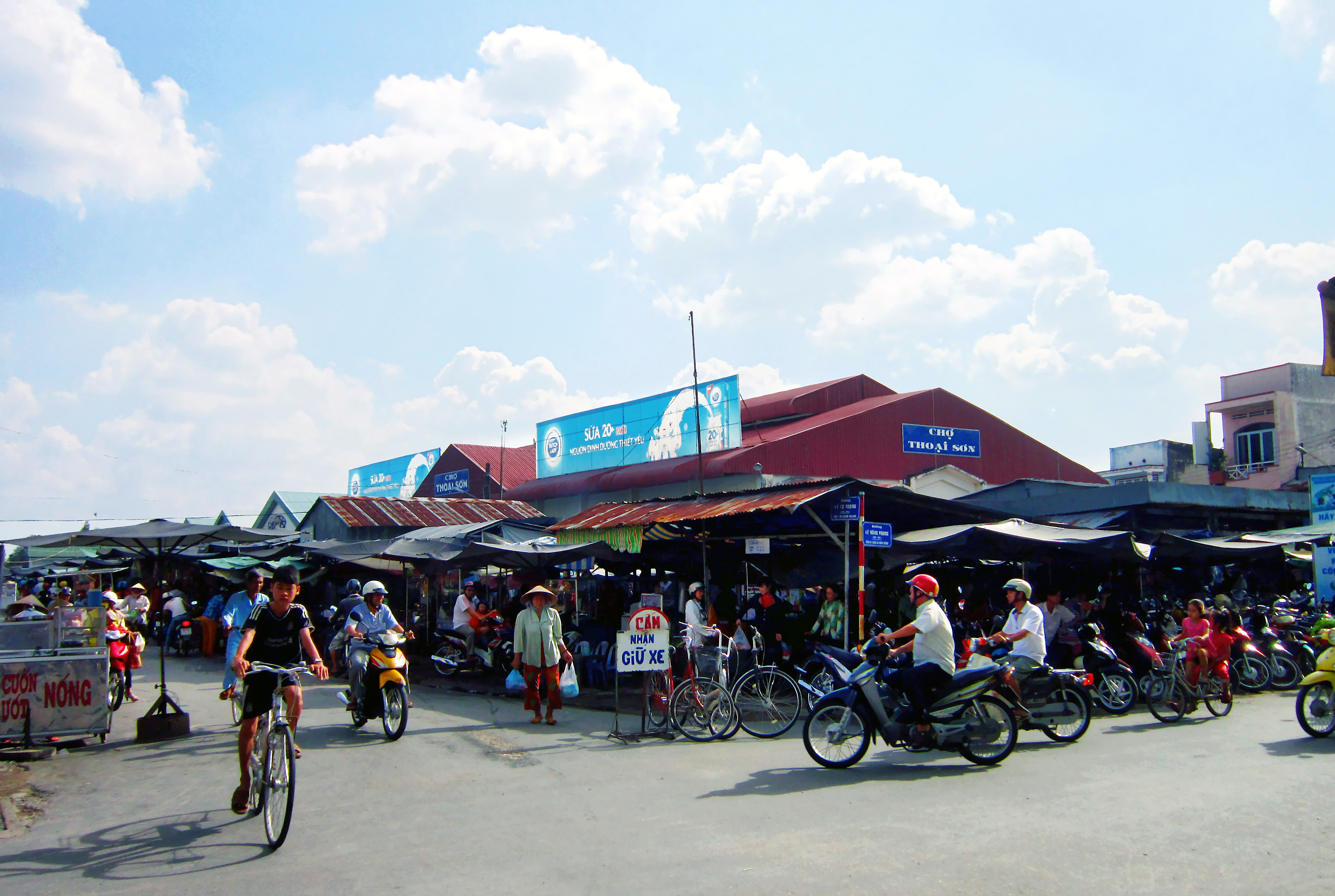
Thoại Sơn Market, Thoại Sơn

Thoại Sơn is a commune (xã) of An Giang Province, Vietnam.
