= Tân Châu, An Giang =

Tân Châu
- Ward
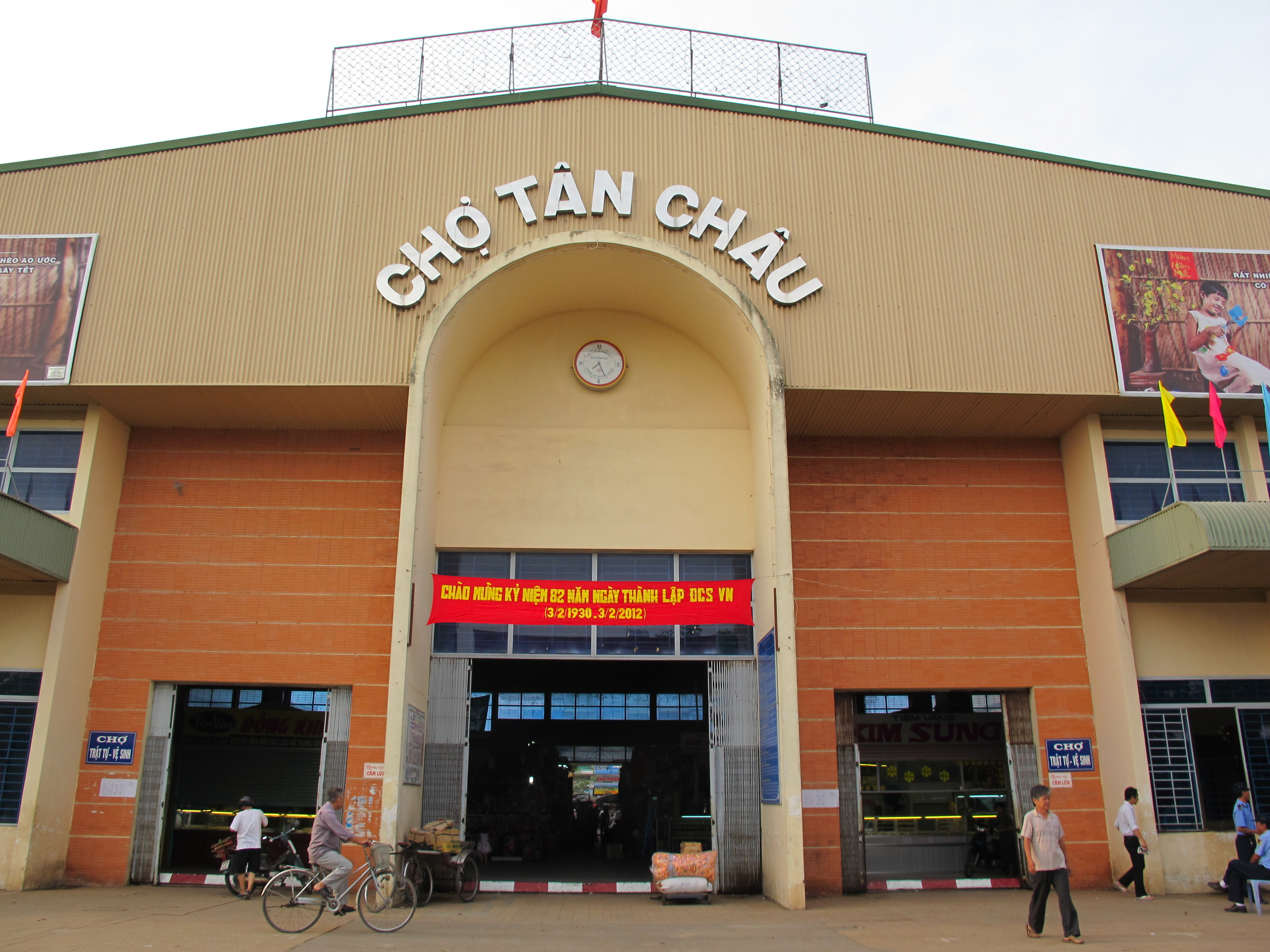
- Tân Châu Market in Long Thạnh Ward
- Interactive map of Tân Châu
- Country: Vietnam
- Province: An Giang

Area
  - Total: 4.42 km^{2} (1.71 sq mi)

Population (2019)
  - Total: 13,979
  - Density: 3,163/km^{2} (8,190/sq mi)
- Time zone: UTC+07:00 (Indochina Time)
- Administrative Code: 30376
- Climate: Tropical savanna

Tân Châu is a ward (phường) of An Giang Province, Vietnam.
