= Núi Cấm, An Giang =

Coordinates: 10°28′15″N 105°02′40″E

Núi Cấm
- Rural commune and village
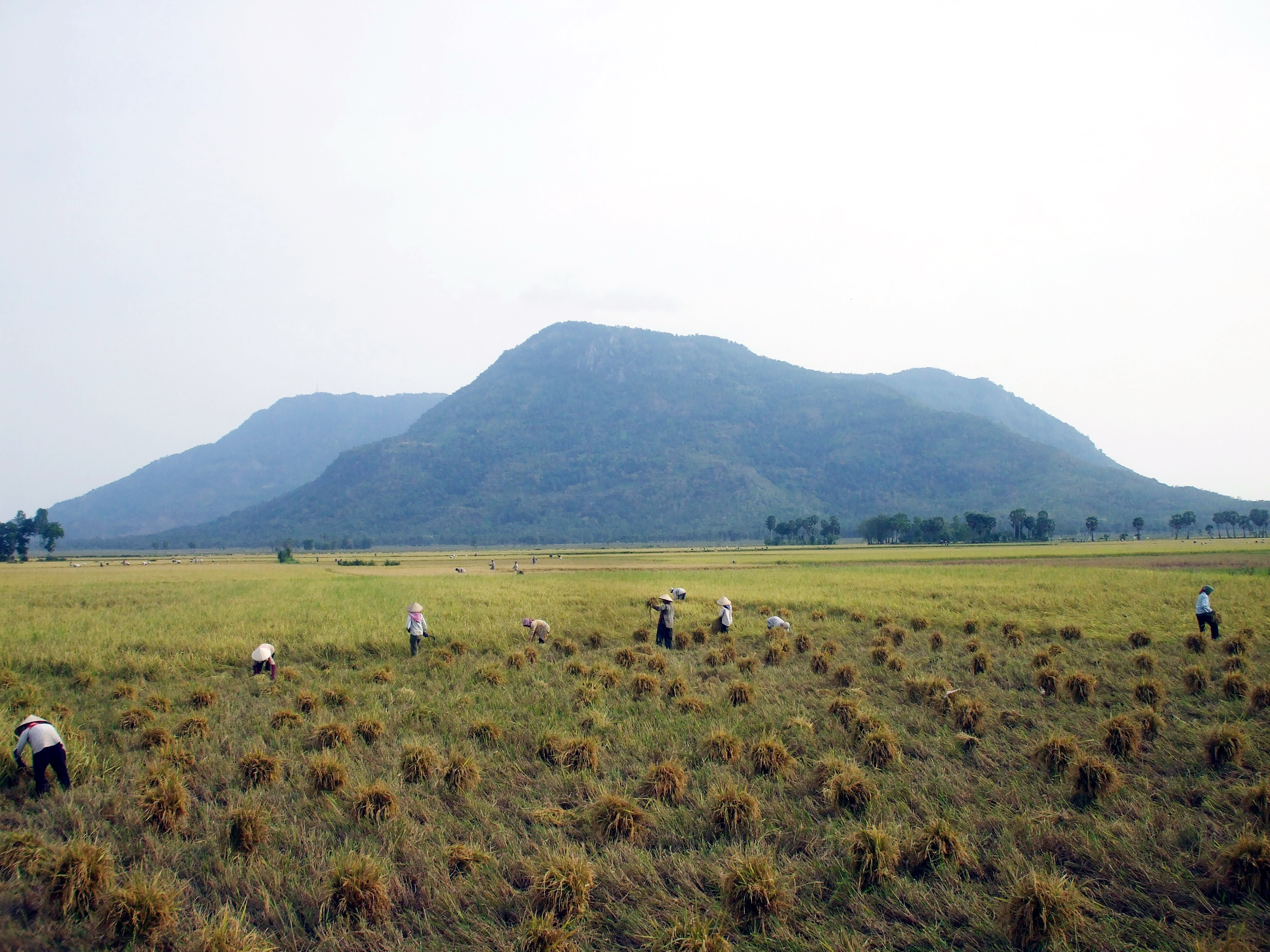
- View of Núi Cấm
- Interactive map of Núi Cấm
- Country: Vietnam
- Province: An Giang
- Time zone: UTC+07:00 (Indochina Time)

Núi Cấm is a rural commune (xã) and village of An Giang Province, Vietnam.
