= Phú Hòa, An Giang =

Phú Hòa
- Commune
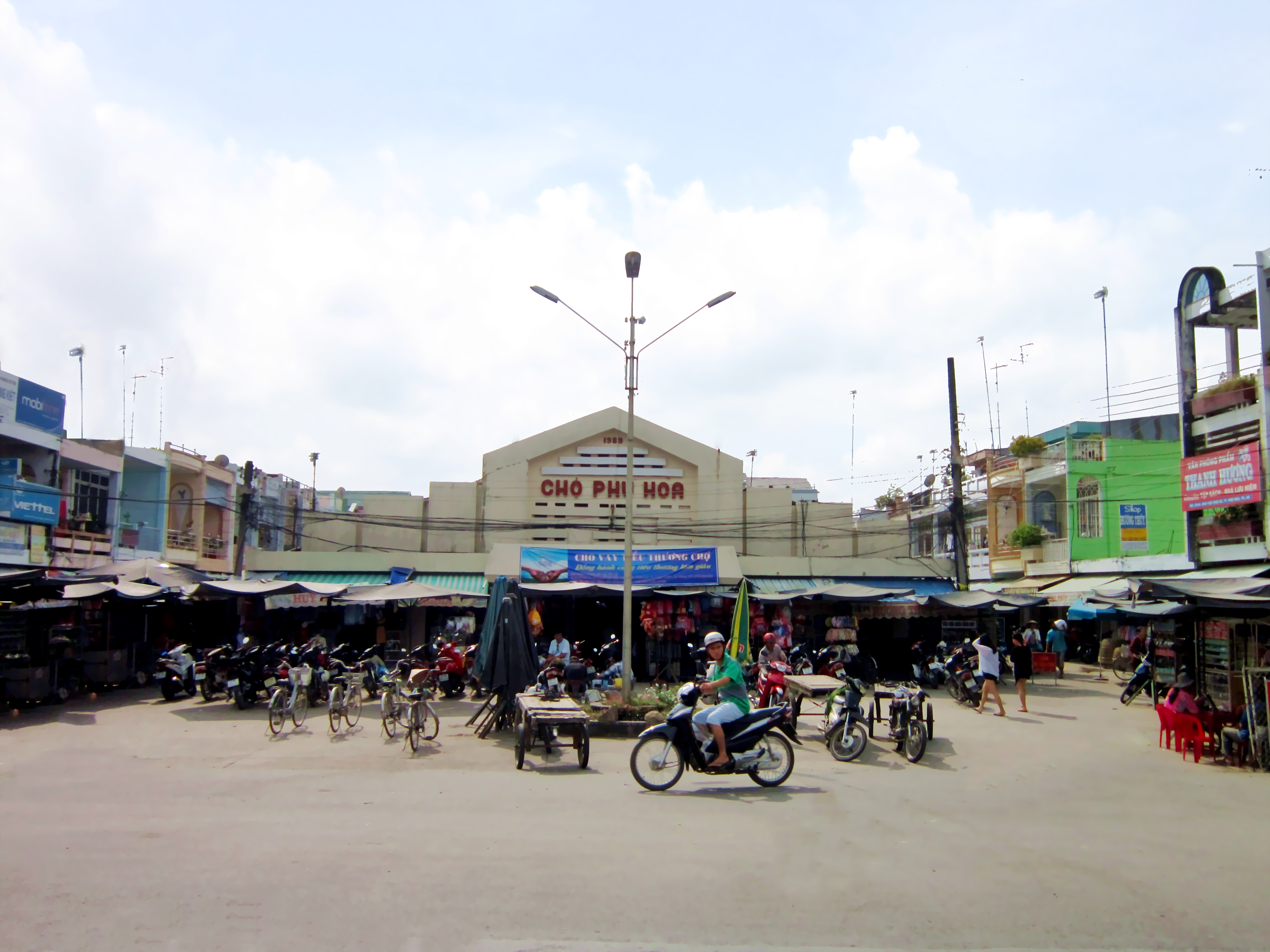
- Interactive map of Phú Hòa
- Country: Vietnam
- Province: An Giang
- Time zone: UTC+07:00 (Indochina Time)
- Climate: Aw

Phú Hòa is a commune (xã) of An Giang Province, Vietnam.
