= Vĩnh Trạch, An Giang =

Rural commune in Vietnam

Vĩnh Trạch
- Rural commune
- Interactive map of Vĩnh Trạch
- Country: Vietnam
- Province: An Giang
- Time zone: UTC+07:00 (Indochina Time)
- Climate: Aw

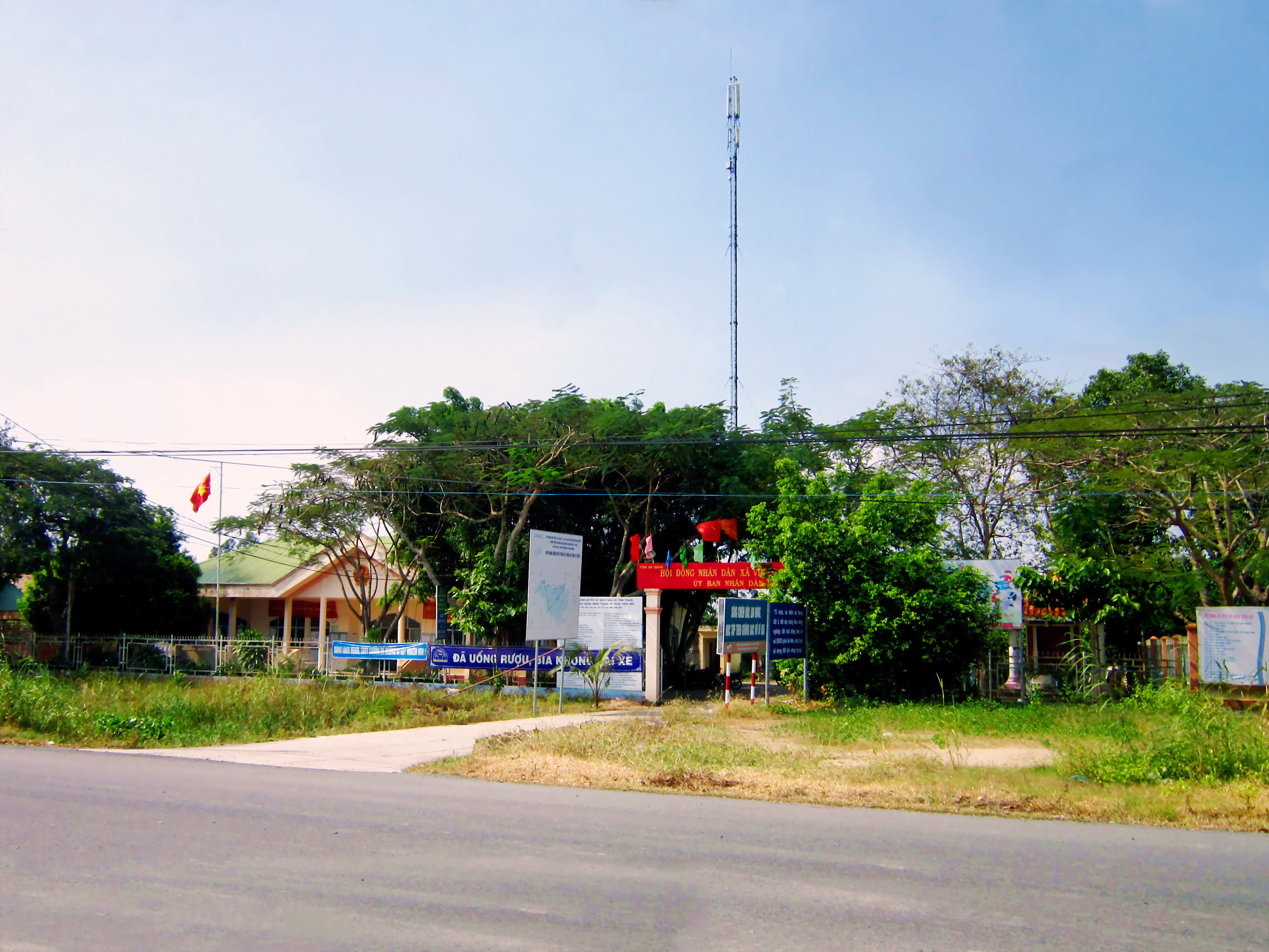
Vĩnh Trạch

Vĩnh Trạch is a rural commune (xã) of An Giang Province, Vietnam.

On June 12, 2025, the Standing Committee of the National Assembly issued Resolution No. 1654/NQ-UBTVQH15 on the arrangement of commune-level administrative units in An Giang Province. Accordingly, the entire natural area and population size of Vĩnh Khánh Commune and Vĩnh Trạch Commune were merged to form a new commune named Vĩnh Trạch Commune.
