= Vĩnh Xương =

Coordinates: 10.8972°N 105.1719°E

- Rural commune and village
- Interactive map of Vĩnh Xương
- Country: Vietnam
- Province: An Giang
- Time zone: UTC+07:00 (Indochina Time)

Vĩnh Xương is a rural commune (xã) and village of An Giang Province, Vietnam.

== International border gate ==
Vĩnh Xương is the location of an international border crossing with Cambodia, with the official name Sông Tiền. Its counterpart across the border is Khaorm Sam Nor Kaoh Roka border gate, Kandal Province, Cambodia. Besides conventional Vietnamese visas, this border crossing is also listed as a Vietnamese Evisa entry point for foreigners.

== Gallery ==
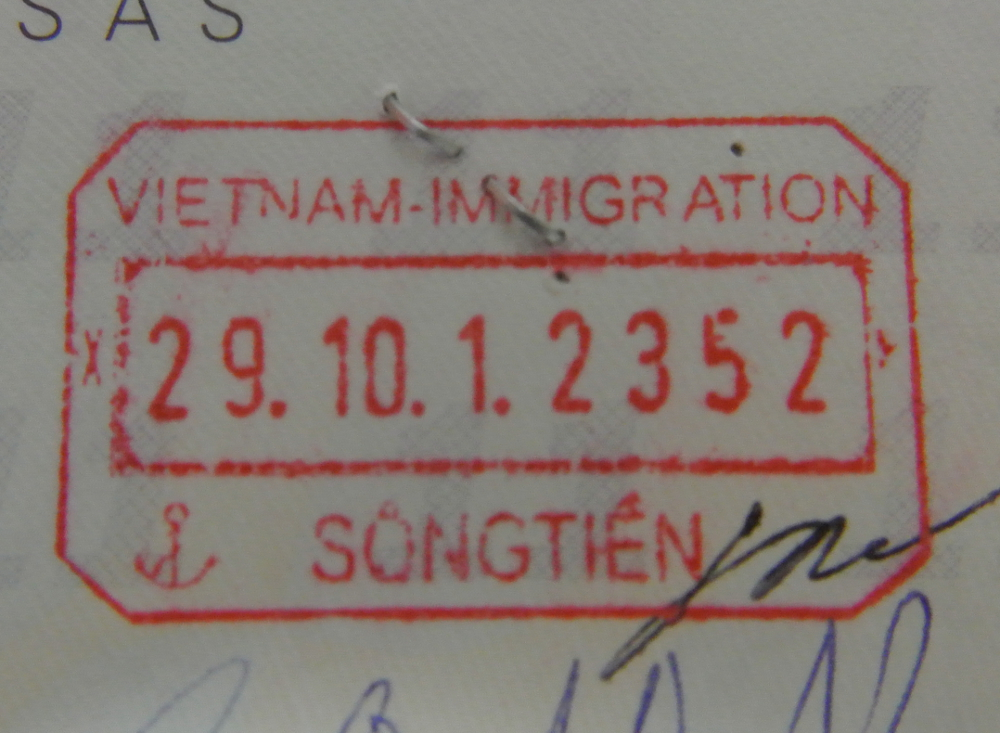
Sông Tiền International bordergate exit stamp.
