= Long Kiến =

Coordinates: 10.4658°N 105.4683°E

- Rural commune and village
- Interactive map of Long Kiến
- Country: Vietnam
- Province: An Giang
- Time zone: UTC+07:00 (Indochina Time)

Long Kiến is a rural commune (xã) and village of An Giang Province, Vietnam.
