= Cù Lao Giêng =

Coordinates: 10.5083°N 105.5064°E

Cù Lao Giêng Xã Cù Lao Giêng
- Rural commune and village
- Interactive map of Cù Lao Giêng
- Country: Vietnam
- Province: An Giang
- Time zone: UTC+07:00 (Indochina Time)

Cù Lao Giêng is a rural commune (xã) and village of An Giang province, Vietnam.
