= Long Phú, An Giang =

Coordinates: 10.7739°N 105.2253°E

Long Phú
- Ward
- Interactive map of Long Phú
- Country: Vietnam
- Province: An Giang
- Time zone: UTC+07:00 (Indochina Time)
- Climate: Aw

Long Phú is a ward (phường) of An Giang Province, Vietnam.
