= Chợ Mới, An Giang =

Chợ Mới
- Commune
- Location in Vietnam
- Coordinates: 10°33′N 105°24′E
- Country: Vietnam
- Province: An Giang Province

Area
  - Total: 1.19 sq mi (3.07 km^{2})

Population (1999)
  - Total: 12,898
  - Density: 10,880/sq mi (4,201/km^{2})
- Time zone: UTC+07:00
- Climate: Aw

Chợ Mới is a commune of An Giang province, Vietnam.

It is known as "the Mecca" of the Hòa Hảo sect, a new religious movement of Vietnam.
