= Vĩnh Bình =

Vĩnh Bình may refer to:

- Vĩnh Bình, Đồng Tháp, a commune in Đồng Tháp province
- Vĩnh Bình, An Giang, a commune in An Giang province

== Names of former places ==
- Vĩnh Bình province, a former province in South Vietnam (today part of Vĩnh Long province)
