= Óc Eo, An Giang =

Coordinates: 21°13′N 106°00′E

Óc Eo
- Rural commune
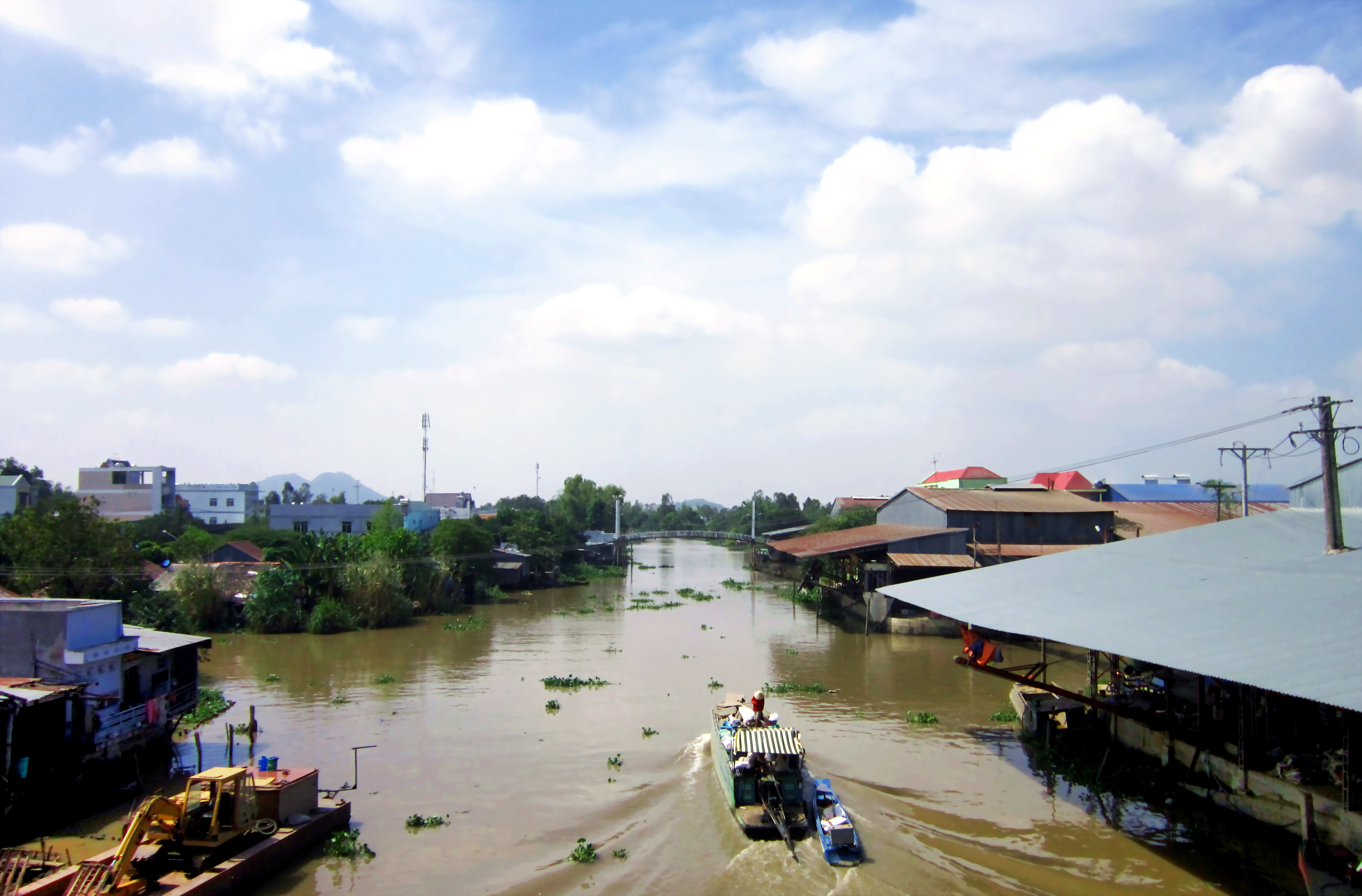
- Interactive map of Óc Eo
- Country: Vietnam
- Province: An Giang
- Time zone: UTC+07:00 (Indochina Time)
- Climate: Aw

Óc Eo is a rural commune (xã) of An Giang Province, Vietnam.
