= Long Điền, An Giang =

Long Điền
- Commune
- Location in Vietnam
- Coordinates: 20°52′N 105°40′E
- Country: Vietnam
- Province: An Giang
- Established: 17 October 2003

Area
  - Total: 3.12 sq mi (8.08 km^{2})

Population (2003)
  - Total: 15,540
  - Density: 4,980/sq mi (1,923/km^{2})
- Time zone: UTC+07:00 (Indochina Time)

Long Điền is a commune (xã) of An Giang Province, Vietnam.
