= Thới Sơn, An Giang =

Coordinates: 11°00′N 106°47′E

Thới Sơn
- ward
- Interactive map of Thới Sơn
- Country: Vietnam
- Province: An Giang
- Time zone: UTC+07:00 (Indochina Time)
- Climate: Aw

Thới Sơn is a ward (phường) of An Giang Province, Vietnam.
