= Phú An, An Giang =

Coordinates: 10°39′31″N 105°20′00″E

Phú An
- Rural commune and village
- Interactive map of Phú An
- Country: Vietnam
- Province: An Giang
- Time zone: UTC+07:00 (Indochina Time)

Phú An is a rural commune (xã) and village of An Giang Province, Vietnam.
