= Tân Thạnh, An Giang =

Tân Thạnh
- Rural commune
- Country: Vietnam
- Province: An Giang
- Time zone: UTC+07:00 (Indochina Time)
- Climate: Aw

Tân Thạnh is a rural commune (xã) of An Giang Province, Vietnam.
