= Vĩnh Bình, An Giang =

Rural commune of Châu Thành District in An Giang Province, Vietnam

Vĩnh Bình
- Rural commune
- Interactive map of Vĩnh Bình
- Country: Vietnam
- Province: An Giang
- Time zone: UTC+07:00 (Indochina Time)
- Climate: Aw

Vĩnh Bình is a rural commune (xã) of An Giang Province, Vietnam.
