= Bình Mỹ, An Giang =

Coordinates: 10.5281°N 105.2794°E

Bình Mỹ
- Rural commune and village
- Interactive map of Bình Mỹ
- Country: Vietnam
- Province: An Giang
- Time zone: UTC+07:00 (Indochina Time)
- Climate: Aw

Bình Mỹ is a rural commune (xã) and village of An Giang Province, Vietnam.
