= Đắk Pơ district =

Đak Pơ district Huyện Đak Pơ
- District
- Interactive map of Đak Pơ district
- Country: Vietnam
- Region: Central Highlands
- Province: Gia Lai province
- Capital: Đak Pơ

Area
  - Total: 192.70 sq mi (499.08 km^{2})

Population (31/12/2024)
  - Total: 47,333
  - Density: 245.64/sq mi (94.841/km^{2})
- Time zone: UTC+7 (Indochina Time)

Đak Pơ is a district (huyện) of Gia Lai province in the Central Highlands region of Vietnam.

As of 2024 the district had a population of 47,333. The district covers an area of 499.08 km². The district capital lies at Đak Pơ.

== Geography ==
Dak Po district is located in the east of Gia Lai province, bordering An Khe town, Tay Son district and Binh Dinh province to the east, Mang Yang district to the west, Kong Chro district to the south, and the Kbang district in the northern direction.

== Administration ==
Dak Po district has 8 administrative units at the commune level, including Dak Po town (district capital) and 7 communes: An Thanh, Cu An, Ha Tam, Phu An, Tan An, Ya Hoi, Yang Bac.

== History ==
Dak Po is one of the areas affected by Agent Orange during the US military's chemical spraying campaign that began on August 10, 1961.

Before 2003, Dak Po district was part of An Khe district.

On December 9, 2003, An Khe district was divided into An Khe town and Dak Po district. Dak Po district was established on the basis of the remaining 7 communes of An Khe district: An Thanh, Cu An, Ha Tam, Phu An, Tan An, Ya Hoi and Yang Bac. At the same time, Dak Po commune was established on the basis of 1,963 hectares of natural area and 3,092 people of An Thanh commune.

When it was first established, the district had 8 administrative units, including 8 communes: An Thanh, Dak Po (district center), Cu An, Ha Tam, Phu An, Tan An, Ya Hoi and Yang Bac.

On December 23, 2013, Dak Po town was established on the basis of the entire 2,178.18 hectares (5,382.4 acres) of natural area and 4,620 people of Dak Po commune. Since then, Dak Po district consists of 1 town and 7 communes as it is today.

Dak Po is also the hometown of the famous hero Nup. This is where a victory took place during the resistance war against the French by the Viet Minh army. The 96th Regiment destroyed the 100th Army Corps. In the Dak Po battle on June 24, 1954, they liberated the entire An Khe district and the eastern area of Pleiku town; coordinated with the Pathet Lao army to liberate many areas in Xieng Khouang.

== Transportation ==
Dak Po district has National Highway 19 passing through it, which is a vital traffic route connecting the Central Coast and the Central Highlands, all the way to Cambodia.
