= Vĩnh An, An Giang =

Rural commune in Vietnam

Vĩnh An
- Rural commune
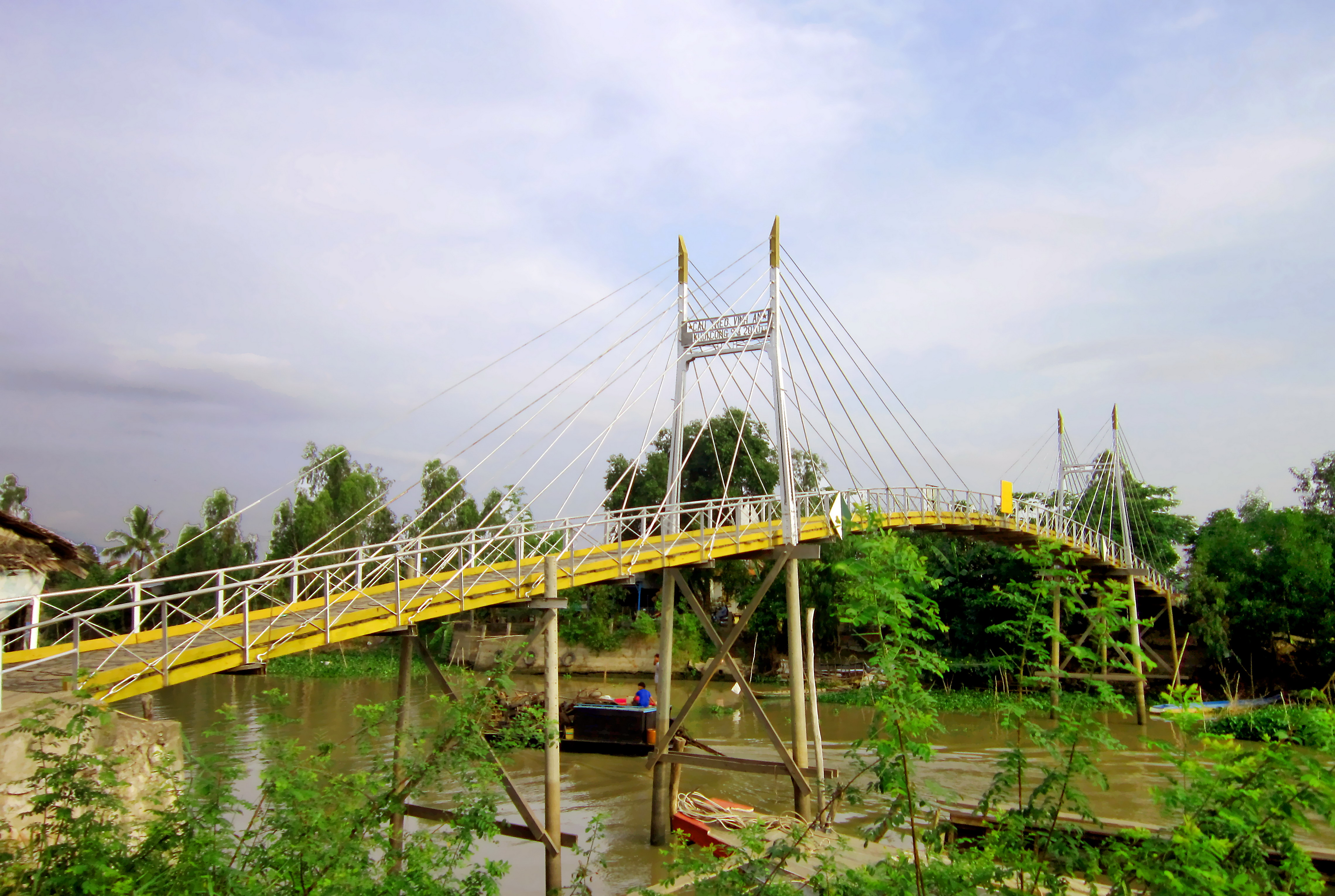
- Cable-stayed bridge in Vĩnh An
- Interactive map of Vĩnh An
- Country: Vietnam
- Province: An Giang
- Time zone: UTC+07:00 (Indochina Time)
- Climate: Aw

Vĩnh An is a rural commune (xã) of An Giang Province, Vietnam.
