= Tân An, An Giang =

Tân An
- Commune
- Location in Vietnam
- Coordinates: 10.8125°N 105.1888°E
- Country: Vietnam
- Province: An Giang
- Time zone: UTC+07:00 (Indochina Time)
- Climate: Aw

Tân An is a commune (xã) of An Giang province, Vietnam.
