= Vĩnh Hòa, An Giang =

Vĩnh Hòa
- Rural commune
- Interactive map of Vĩnh Hòa
- Country: Vietnam
- Province: An Giang
- Time zone: UTC+07:00 (Indochina Time)
- Climate: Aw

Vĩnh Hòa is a rural commune (xã) of An Giang Province, Vietnam.
