= Tây Phú =

Coordinates: 10°21′N 105°16′E

- Rural commune
- Interactive map of Tây Phú
- Country: Vietnam
- Province: An Giang
- Time zone: UTC+07:00 (Indochina Time)
- Climate: Aw

Tây Phú is a rural commune (xã) of An Giang Province, Vietnam.
