= An Cư, An Giang =

An Cư
- Rural commune and village
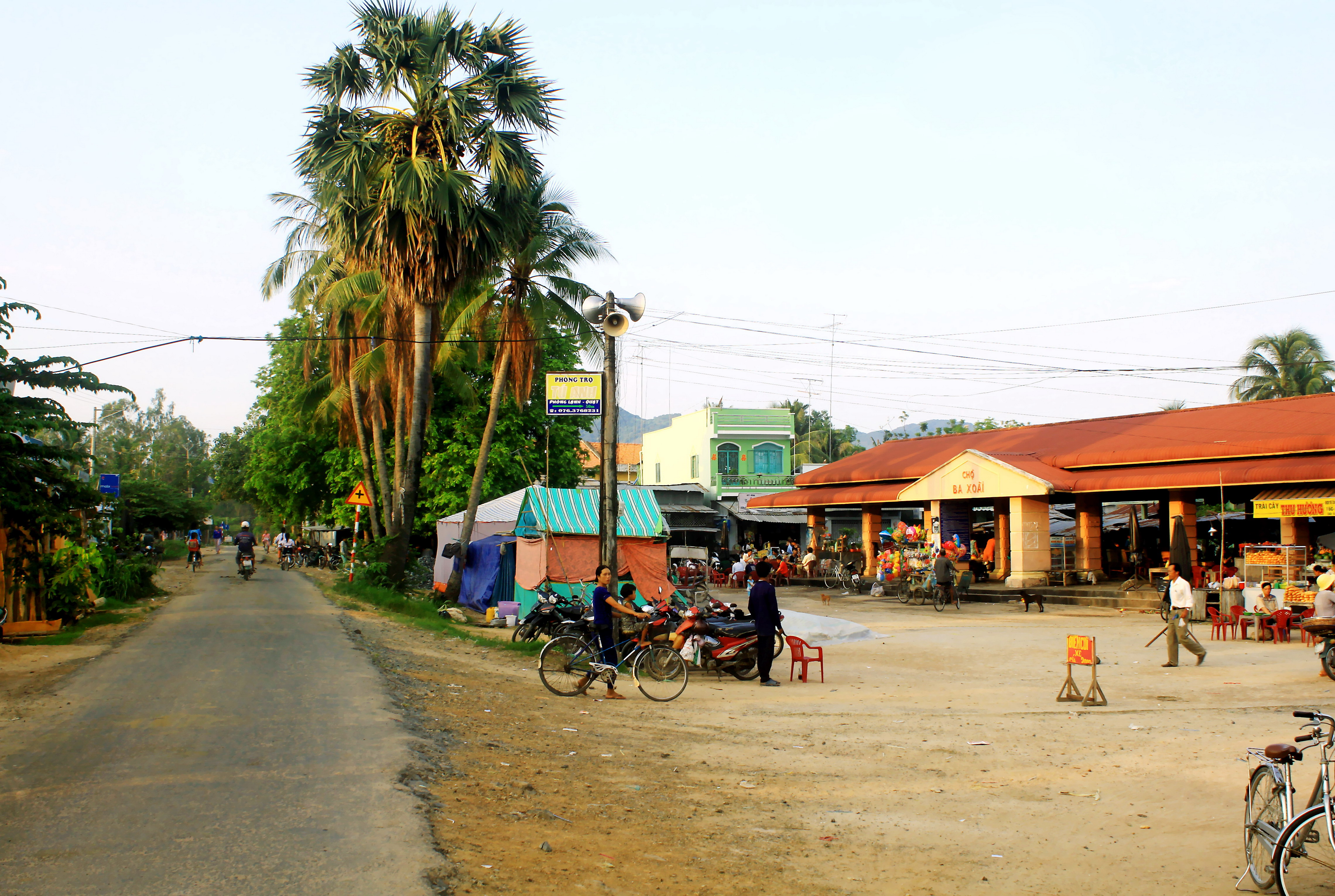

- Location in Vietnam
- Coordinates: 10°22′1″N 106°1′5″E
- Country: Vietnam
- Province: An Giang
- Time zone: UTC+07:00 (Indochina Time)

An Cư is a rural commune (xã) and village of the An Giang Province, Vietnam.
