= Mỹ Đức, An Giang =

Mỹ Đức
- Rural commune and village
- Location in Vietnam
- Coordinates: 10°39′59″N 105°10′47″E
- Country: Vietnam
- Province: An Giang
- Time zone: UTC+07:00 (Indochina Time)
- Climate: Aw

Mỹ Đức is a rural commune (xã) and village of An Giang Province, Vietnam.
