= Tri Tôn =

- Commune and town
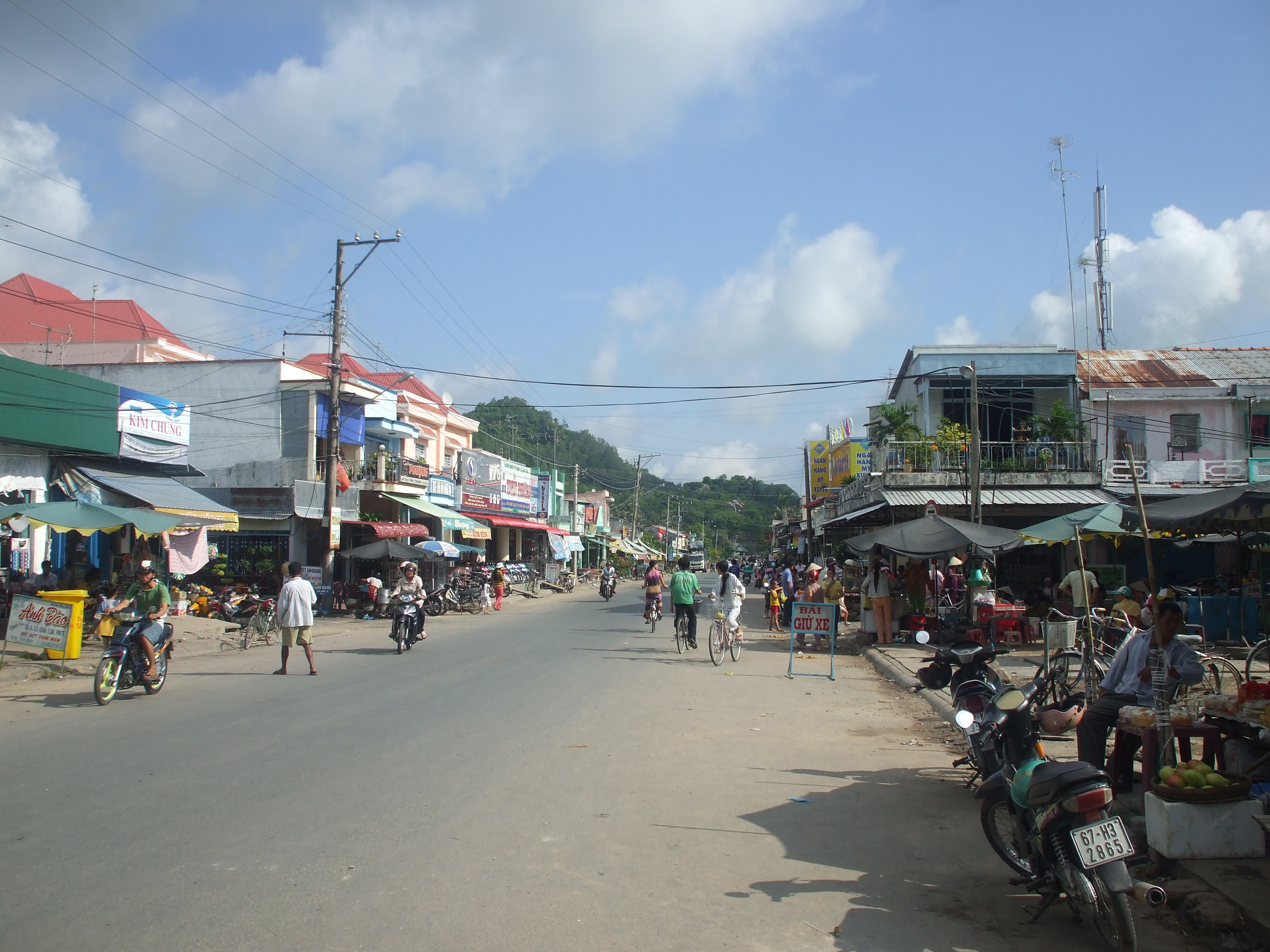

- Location in Vietnam
- Coordinates: 10°25′N 105°0′E
- Country: Vietnam
- Province: An Giang Province
- Time zone: UTC+7 (UTC+7)
- Climate: Aw

Tri Tôn is a commune (xã) of An Giang Province, Vietnam. In native Khmer language, it is called Srok Svayton.
