= Vĩnh Thạnh Trung =

Coordinates: 10.5750°N 105.2158°E

- Rural commune and village
- Interactive map of Vĩnh Thạnh Trung
- Country: Vietnam
- Province: An Giang
- Time zone: UTC+07:00 (Indochina Time)

Vĩnh Thạnh Trung is a rural commune (xã) and village of An Giang Province, Vietnam.
