= An Châu, An Giang =

Township and capital of Châu Thành District in An Giang Province, Vietnam

An Châu
- Commune
- Location in Vietnam
- Coordinates: 10.4436°N 105.3847°E
- Country: Vietnam
- Province: An Giang
- Time zone: UTC+07:00 (Indochina Time)
- Climate: Aw

An Châu is a commune (xã) of An Giang Province, Vietnam.
