= An Minh district =

Coordinates: 9.667°N 105.000°E

An Minh district Huyện An Minh
- District
- Interactive map of An Minh district
- Country: Vietnam
- Region: Mekong Delta
- Province: Kiên Giang province
- Capital: Thứ Mười Một

Area
  - Total: 275 sq mi (711 km^{2})

Population (2018)
  - Total: 120,193
- Time zone: UTC+7 (Indochina Time)

An Minh (Vietnamese: An Minh) is a former rural district (huyện) of Kiên Giang province in the Mekong Delta region of Vietnam.

== Divisions ==
The district is divided into the following communes:

An Minh, Đông Thạnh, Tân Thạnh, Thuận Hoà, Vân Khánh Đông, Vân Khánh Tây, Vân Khánh, Đông Hưng, Đông Hưng A, Đông Hưng B and Đông Hoà.

As of 2003 the district had a population of 112,215. The district covers an area of 711 km^{2} (275 sq mi). The district capital lies at Thứ Mười Một.
