= An Giang province =

Province of Vietnam

An Giang
- Province
- Tỉnh An Giang 省安江
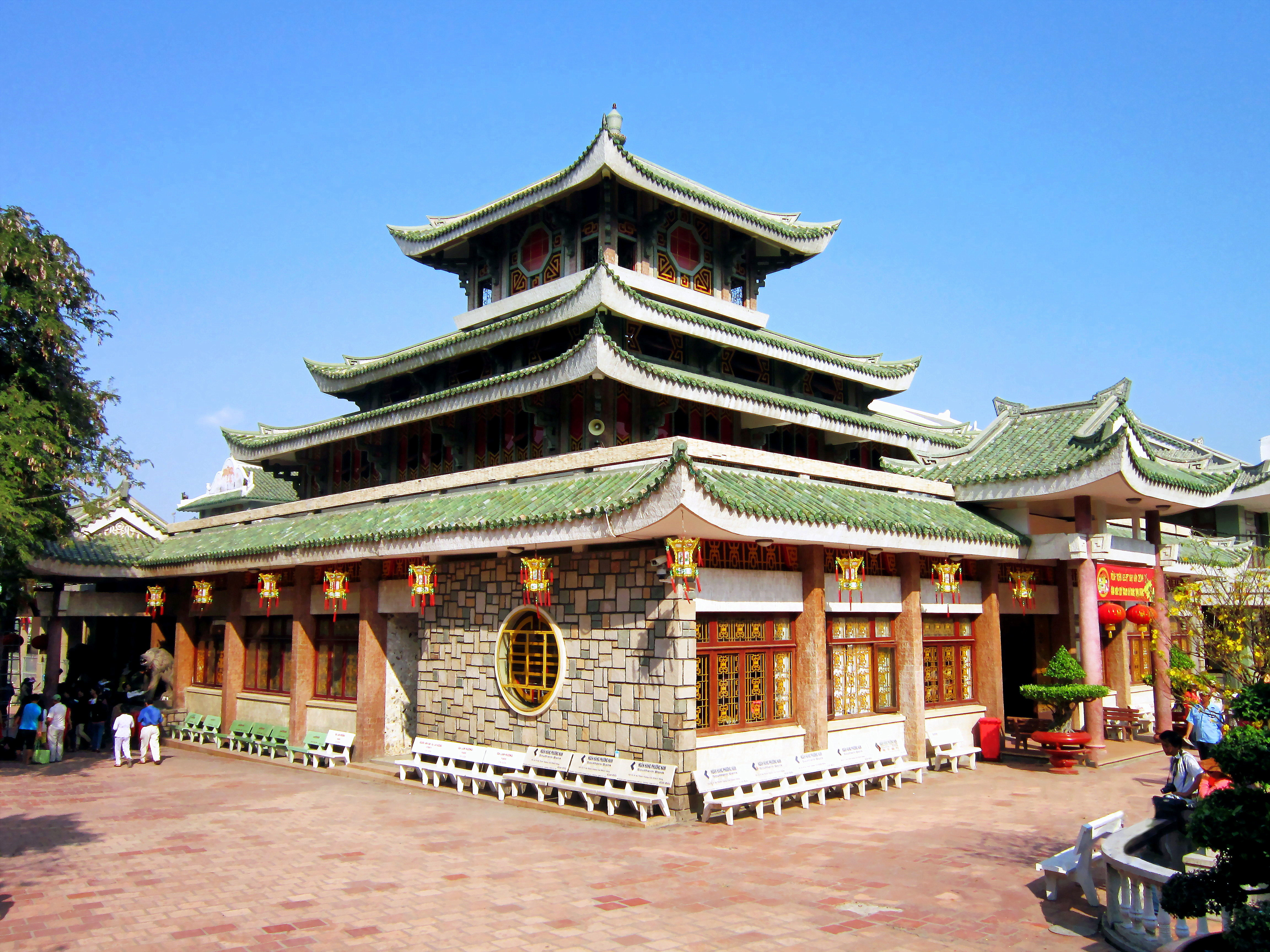
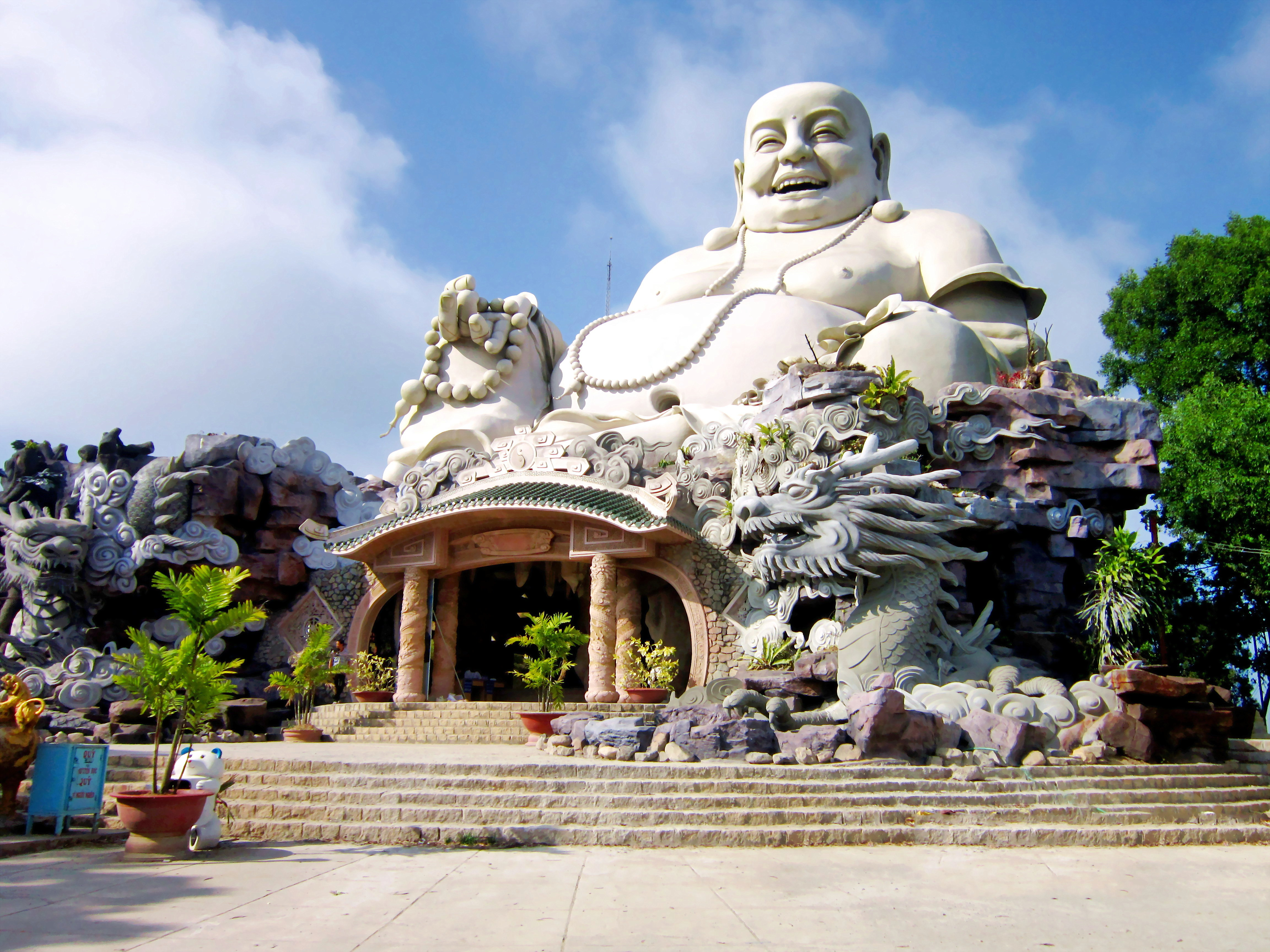
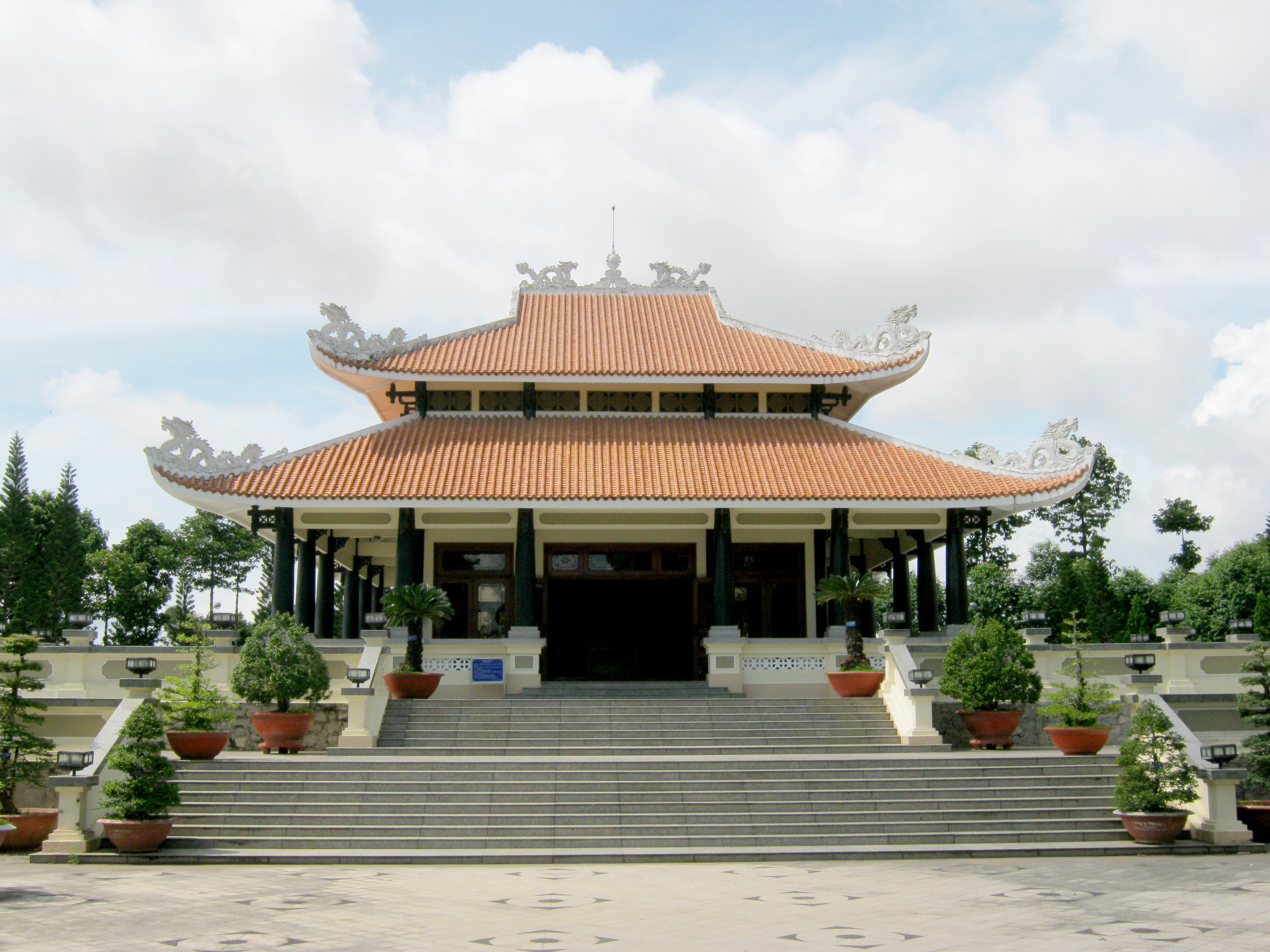
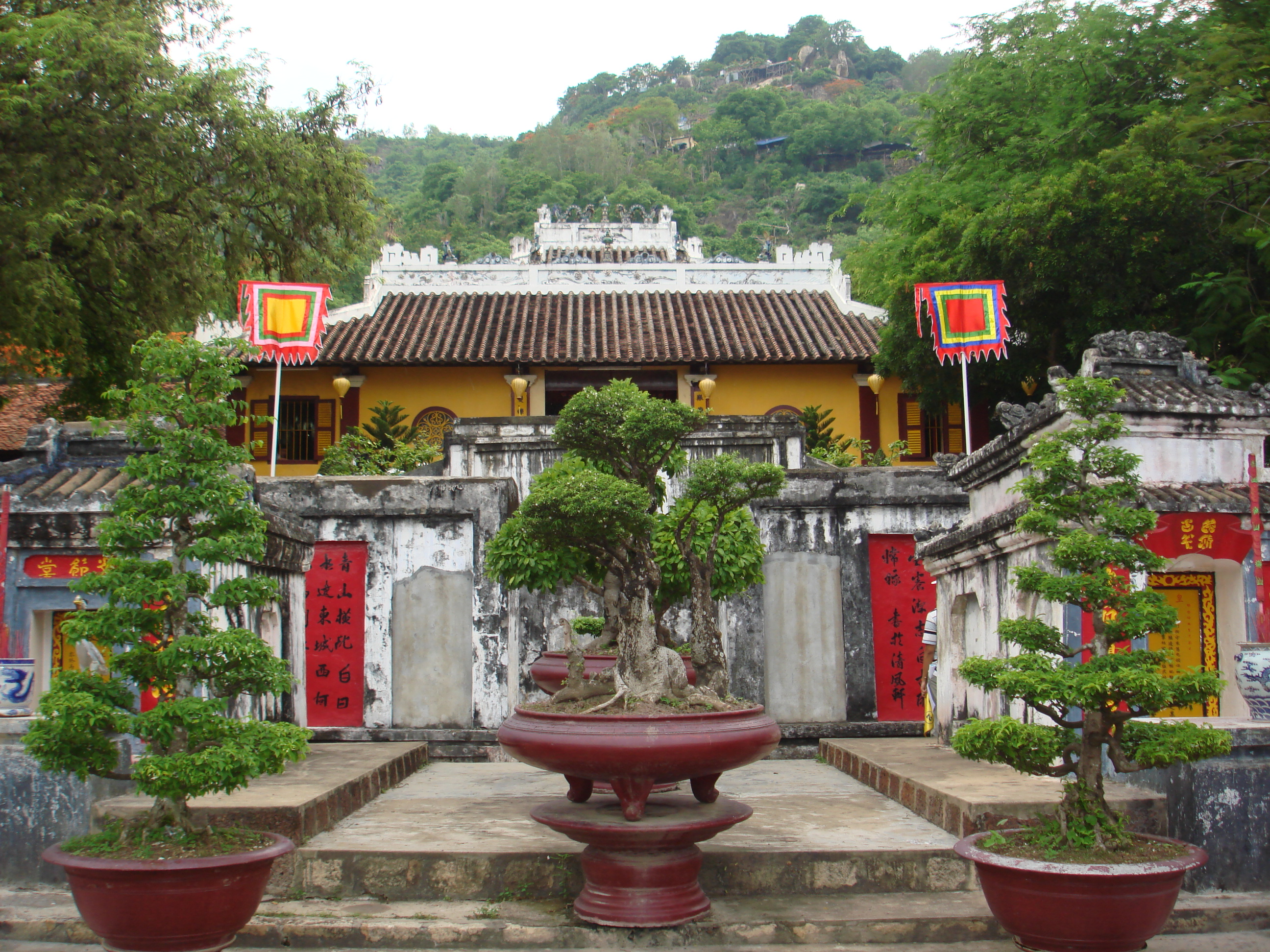
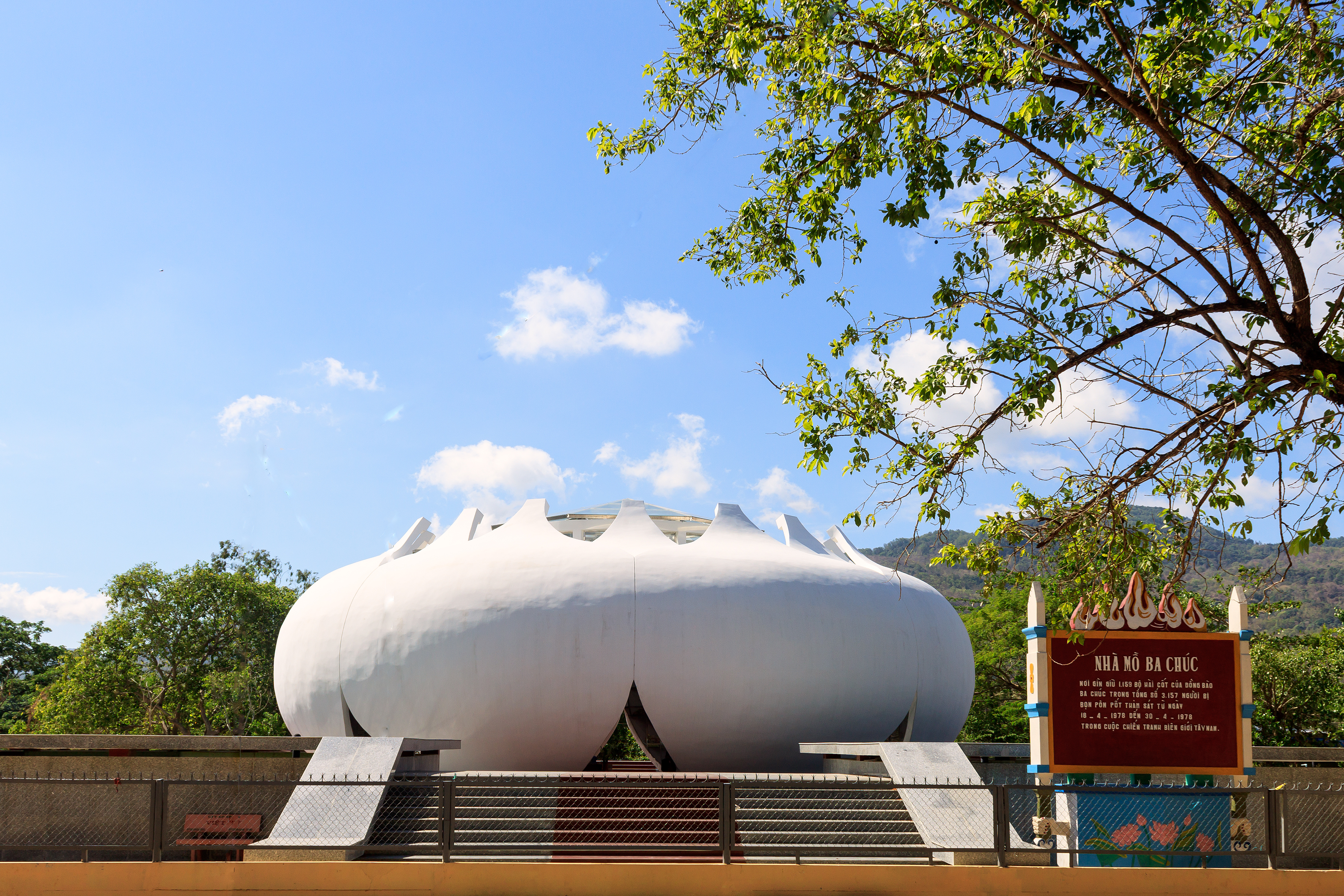
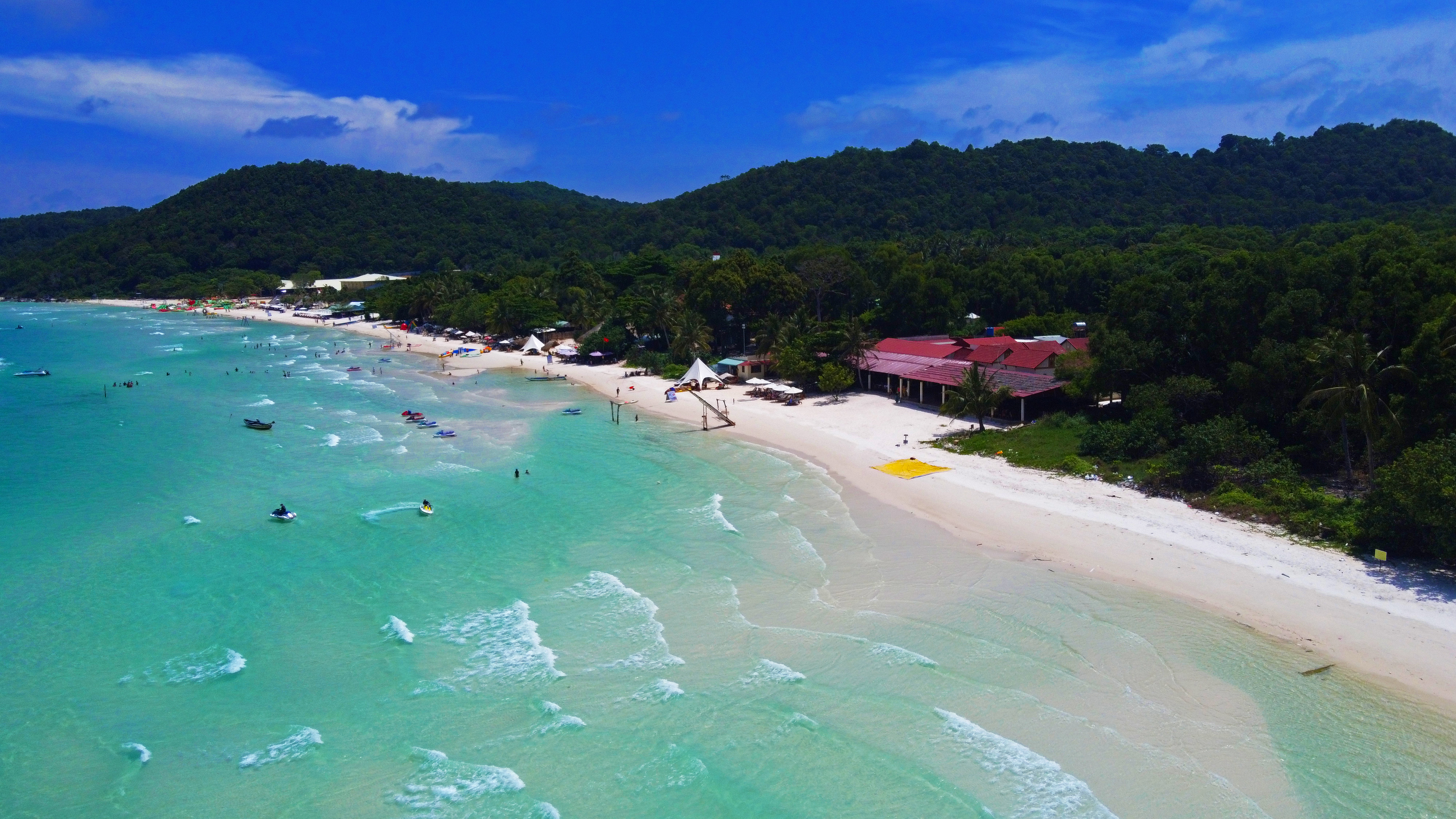
- Bà Chúa Xứ Temple of Sam Mountain, Maitreya Buddha statue sitting on Cấm Mountain in Tịnh Biên, Temple of late President Tôn Đức Thắng, Mausoleum of Thoại Ngọc Hầu, Tomb of Ba Chúc, Island of Phú Quốc

- Seal
- Nickname(s): The Land of Seven Mountains; The coastal land of Mekong Delta
- Motto: Harmonious blend of nature - Rich cultural identity (tourism only)
- Location of An Giang within Vietnam
- Interactive map of An Giang
- Coordinates: 10°30′N 105°10′E
- Country: Vietnam
- Region: Mekong Delta
- Capital of Province: Rạch Giá ward

Government
  - People's Council Chair: Nguyễn Thanh Nhàn
  - People's Committee Chair: Hồ Văn Mừng

Area
  - Total: 9,888.91 km^{2} (3,818.13 sq mi)

Population (2025)
  - Total: 4,952,238
  - Density: 500.787/km^{2} (1,297.03/sq mi)

Demographics
  - Ethnicities: Vietnamese, Khmer, Hoa, Chăm

GDP
  - Total: VND 74.297 trillion US$ 3.227 billion
- Time zone: UTC+7 (ICT)
- Area codes: 296
- ISO 3166 code: VN-44
- HDI (2020): ▲0.663 (55th)
- Website: angiang.gov.vn/en

An Giang is a province of Vietnam and is located in the Mekong Delta, in the country's southwestern part.

== Geography ==
An Giang is a province located in the westernmost part of the Mekong Delta region of Vietnam. Located 187 km southwest of Hồ Chí Minh City, this province comprises the mainland, islands, and archipelagos. This province has a geographical location:

- To the north, it borders the Kingdom of Cambodia.
- To the east, it borders Đồng Tháp province.
- To the west lies a coastline bordering the Gulf of Thailand.
- To the south, it borders Cà Mau province.
- To the southeast, it borders Cần Thơ city.

== Administrative divisions ==
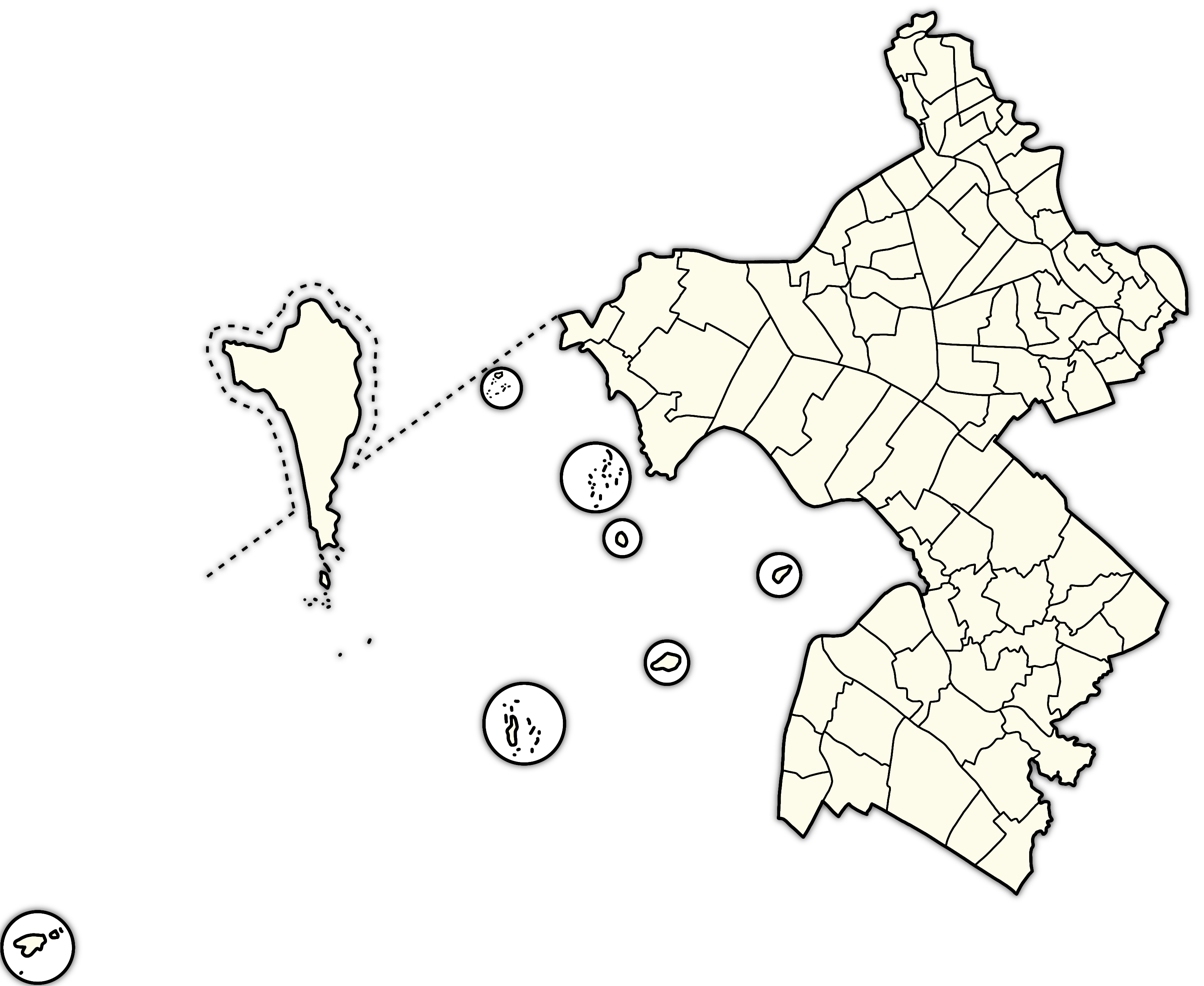
Administrative divisions in An Giang province.

An Giang province is divided into 102 commune-level administrative units, including 14 wards, 85 communes and 3 special zones.

- 14 wards: Rạch Giá (capital province), Vĩnh Thông, Hà Tiên, Tô Châu, Long Xuyên, Mỹ Thới, Bình Đức, Châu Đốc, Vĩnh Tế, Tân Châu, Long Phú, Chi Lăng, Thới Sơn, Tịnh Biên.
- 85 communes: An Biên, An Châu, An Cư, An Minh, An Phú, Ba Chúc, Bình An, Bình Giang, Bình Hòa, Bình Mỹ, Bình Sơn, Bình Thạnh Đông, Cần Đăng, Châu Phong, Châu Phú, Châu Thành, Chợ Mới, Chợ Vàm, Cô Tô, Cù Lao Giêng, Định Hòa, Định Mỹ, Đông Hòa, Đông Hưng, Đông Thái, Giang Thành, Giồng Riềng, Gò Quao, Hòa Điền, Hòa Hưng, Hòa Lạc, Hòa Thuận, Hội An, Hòn Đất, Hòn Nghệ, Khánh Bình, Kiên Lương, Long Điền, Long Kiến, Long Thạnh, Mỹ Đức, Mỹ Hòa Hưng, Mỹ Thuận, Ngọc Chúc, Nhơn Hội, Nhơn Mỹ, Núi Cấm, Óc Eo, Ô Lâm, Phú An, Phú Hòa, Phú Hữu, Phú Lâm, Phú Tân, Sơn Hải, Sơn Kiên, Tân Hiệp, Tân An, Tân Hội, Tân Thạnh, Tây Phú, Tây Yên, Thạnh Đông, Thạnh Hưng, Thạnh Lộc, Thạnh Mỹ Tây, Thoại Sơn, Tiên Hải, Tri Tôn, U Minh Thượng, Vân Khánh, Vĩnh An, Vĩnh Bình, Vĩnh Điều, Vĩnh Gia, Vĩnh Hanh, Vĩnh Hậu, Vĩnh Hòa, Vĩnh Hòa Hưng, Vĩnh Phong, Vĩnh Thạnh Trung, Vĩnh Thuận, Vĩnh Trạch, Vĩnh Tuy, Vĩnh Xương.
- 3 special zone: Phú Quốc, Thổ Châu, Kiên Hải.

== History ==
=== Under Nguyễn lords ===
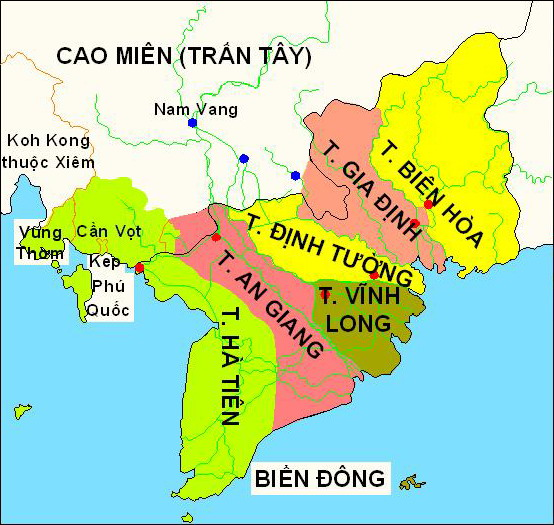
Nam Kỳ Lục tỉnh (1832 - 1841)

An Giang was the former territory of Chân Lạp. In 1757, Cambodia's King Nặc Đôn (Ang Tong) died. (Note: Nặc Nguyên (Ang Snguon) died since 1755. Nặc Đôn (Ang Tong) succeeded and reigned till 1757.) The regent Nặc Nhuận paid his two prefectures: Trà Vinh and Ba Thắc as tribute to Lord Võ to get approval as the new king of Cambodia. Afterward, Nặc Nhuận's son-in-law killed him to ascend the crown. Nặc Đôn's grandson, Nặc Tôn (Ang Ton) fled to Hà Tiên seeking for military aid. Lord Võ appointed Nặc Tôn as the new king of Cambodia and ordered Mạc Thiên Tứ and his troops to escort Nặc Tôn back. In return, Nặc Tôn ceded the Tầm Phong Long region to Lord Võ. Lord Võ divided this region to three sub-regions: Châu Đốc, Tân Châu, and Đông Khẩu, under the administration of Long Hồ palace.

=== Under Nguyễn dynasty ===
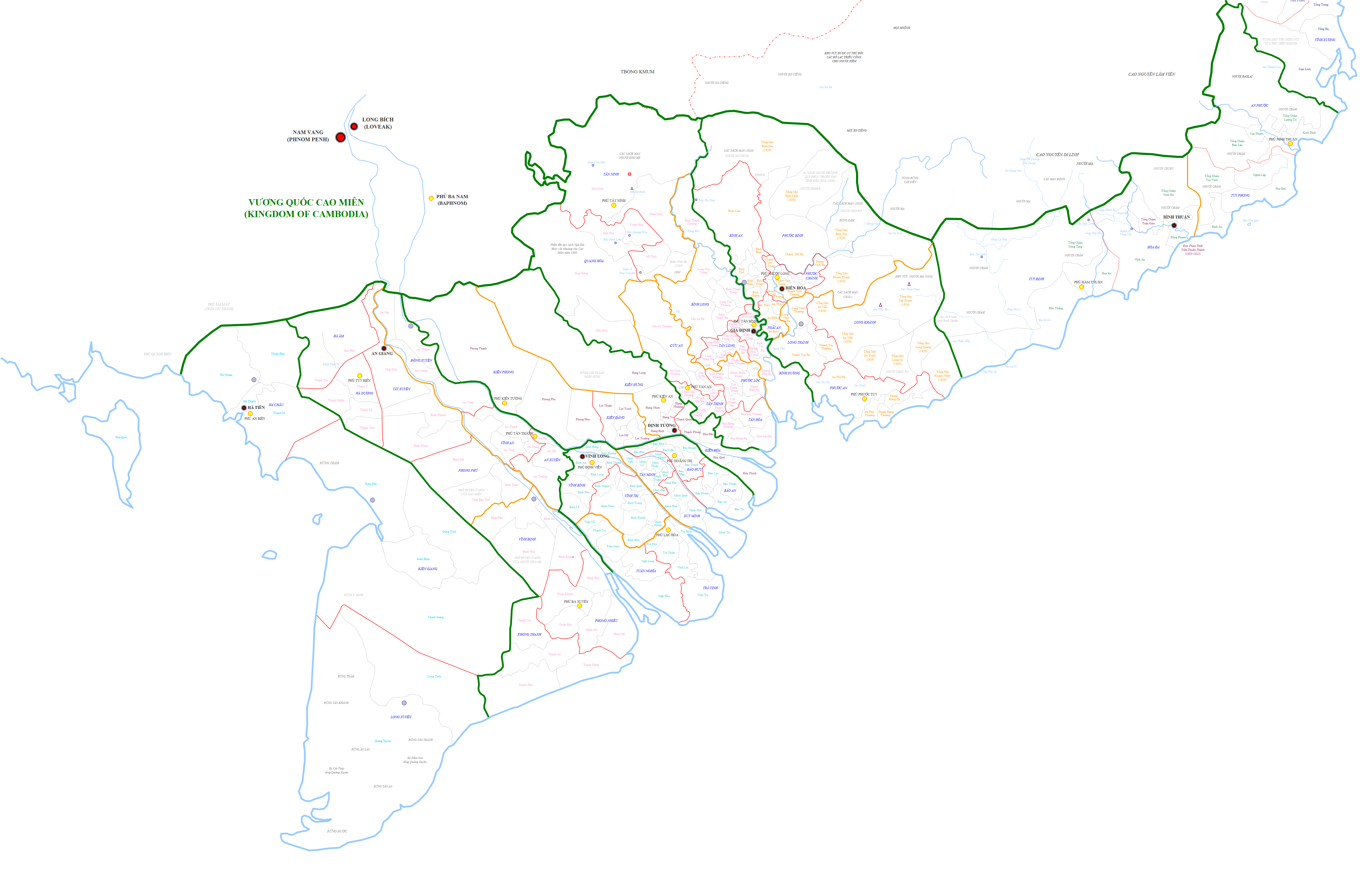
Six Provinces of Lower Cochinchina, and Bình Thuận in 1850

In 1808, Emperor Gia Long renamed Lower Cochinchina from Gia Định trấn to Gia Định thành, its four palaces (dinh): Phiên Trấn, Trấn Biên, Trấn Định, Vĩnh Trấn (Long Hồ) were also renamed to protectorate (trấn): Phiên An, Biên Hoà, Định Tường, Vĩnh Thanh respectively. Định Viễn district was renamed to Định Viễn prefecture. Vĩnh Thanh protectorate contained both Vĩnh Long and An Giang.

An Giang province was first established in 1832 when Emperor Minh Mạng divided Lower Cochinchina into Six Provinces. An Giang province contained two prefectures: Tân Thành,Tuy Biên, divided into four districts: Vĩnh An, Vĩnh Định, Đông Xuyên, and Tây Xuyên. Lê Đại Cương was appointed the governor-general of An – Hà (An Giang – Hà Tiên) cum viceroy of Chân Lạp. Under Cương administration were: Ngô Bá Nhân – An Giang provincial governor, and Phạm Xuân Bích - Hà Tiên provincial governor, both were appointed before.

=== After August Revolution ===
On 22/10/1956, South Vietnam president Ngô Đình Diệm issued Decree No. 143-NV merging Châu Đốc province and Long Xuyên province to reestablish An Giang province.

=== 2025 Merger ===
On June 12, 2025, the National Assembly passed Resolution No. 202/2025/QH15, which took effect the same day, merging Kiên Giang Province into An Giang Province.

== Etymology ==
An Giang is derived from the Sino-Vietnamese word: 安江, meaning "peaceful river." The designation dates back to the Nguyễn dynasty era. In 1832, during the reign of Minh Mạng, it was formally established as one of the southern provinces of Vietnam.

== Demographics ==
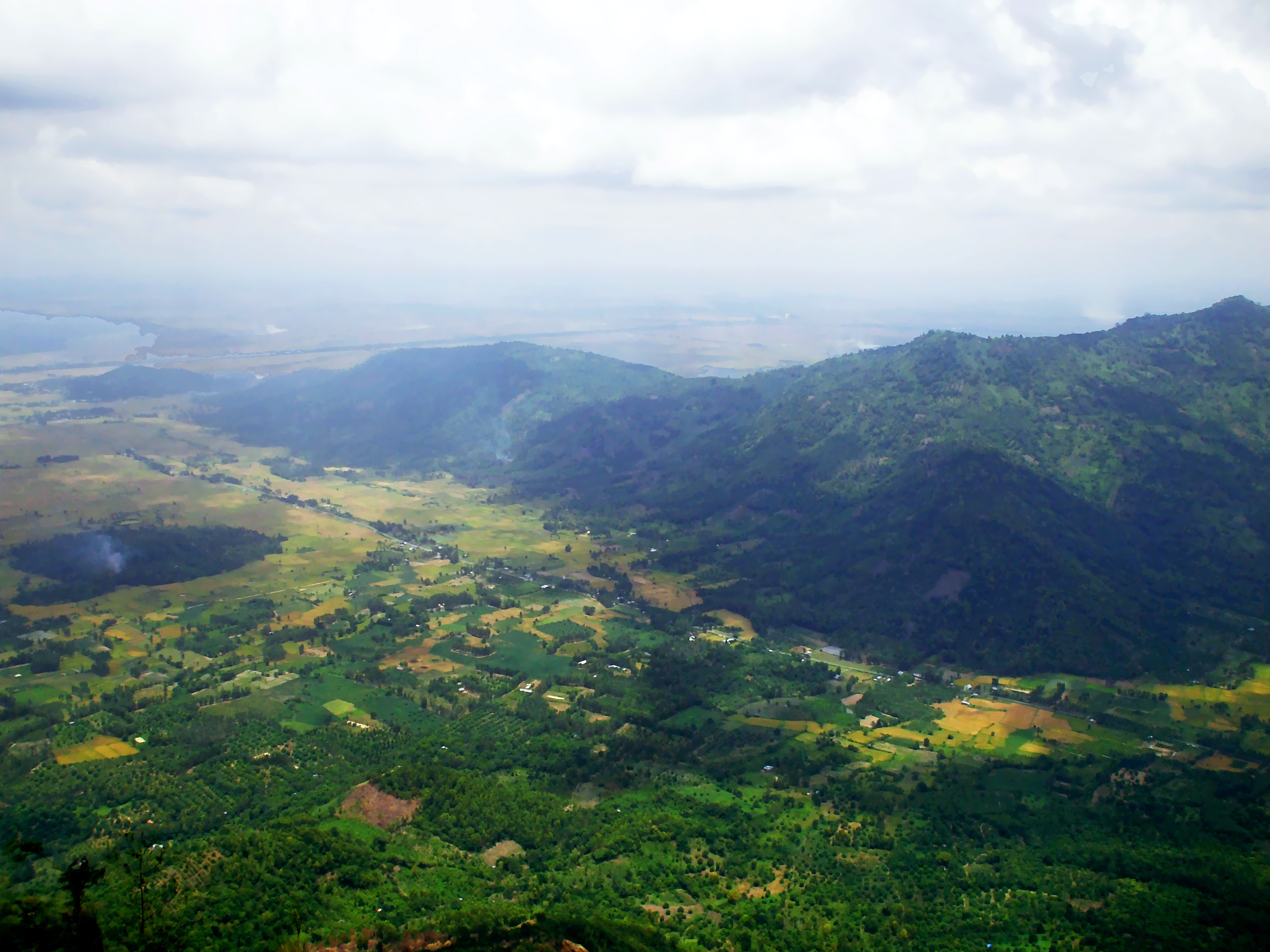
Cam Mountains

As of 2020, An Giang Province covers an area of 3,536.83 square kilometers with a population of 1,904,532 people, resulting in a population density of 539 people per square kilometer. The province is home to 24,011 households of ethnic minorities, comprising 114,632 people, accounting for 5.17% of the provincial population.
