= Gio Linh district =

Coordinates: 16.917°N 107.000°E

Gio Linh Rural District Huyện Gio Linh
- Rural District
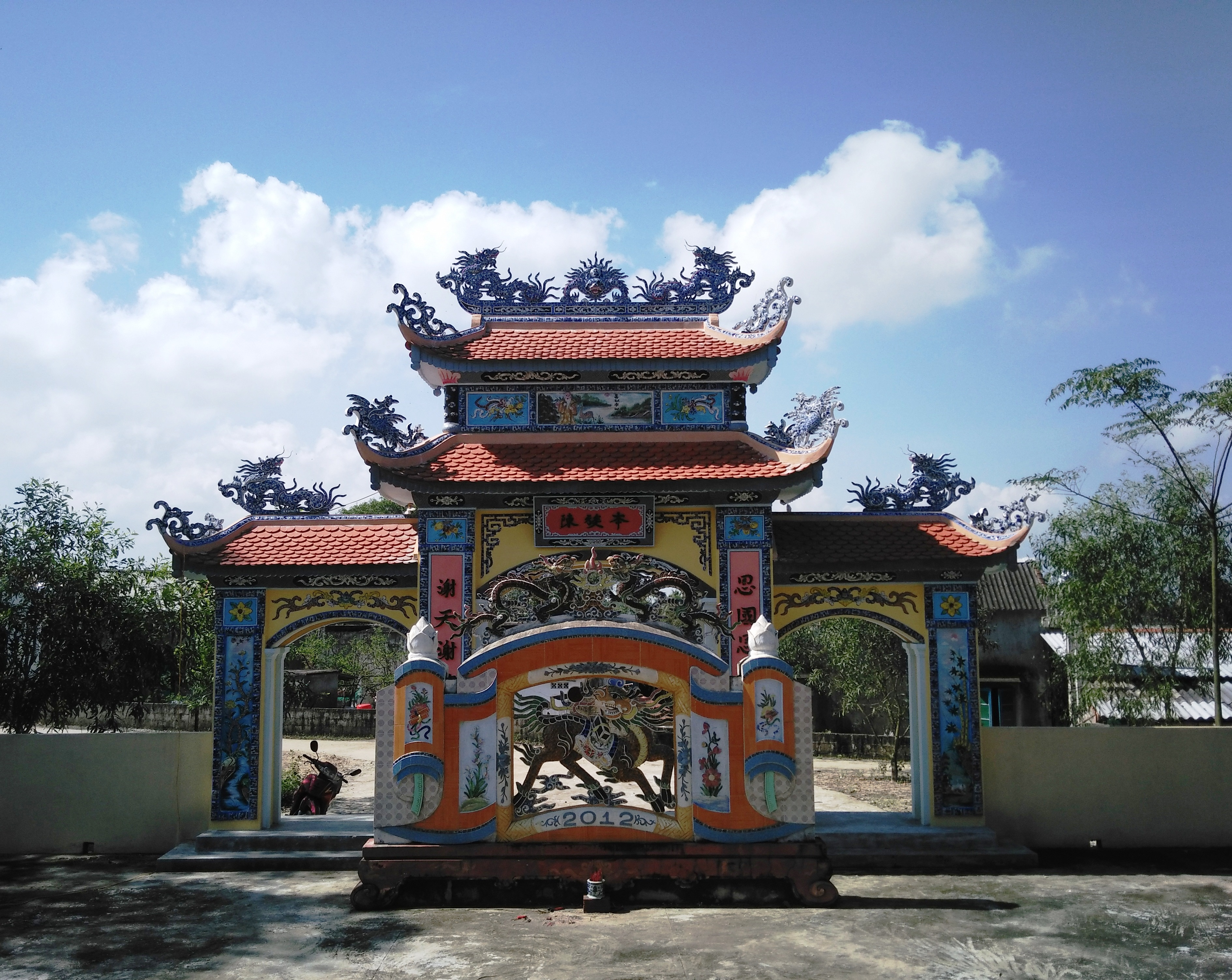
- Trần clan lineage hall in Cát Sơn, Gio Linh.

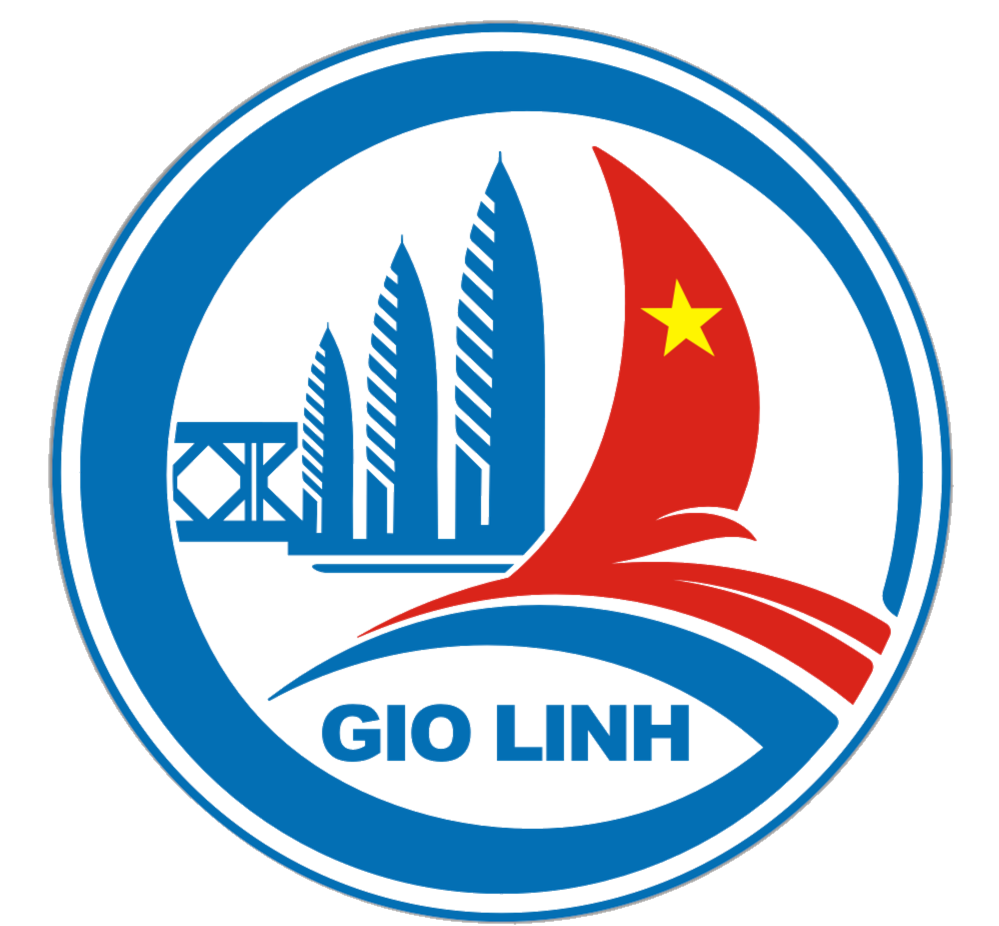
- Seal
- Nickname: "Sunshineland" (Miền nắng-cháy)
- Interactive map of Gio Linh Rural District
- Country: Vietnam
- Region: North Central Coast
- Province: Quảng Trị
- Establishment: 1306
- Dissolution: June 31, 2025
- Central hall: W3FP+94M, Gio Linh Township, Gio Linh Rural District, Quảng Trị Province

Government
  - Type: Rural district
  - District Committee's Chairman: Võ Đắc Hóa
  - People Council's chairman: Trương Chí Trung
  - Front Committee's chairman: Nguyễn Thiên Bình
  - Party Committee's Secretary: Lê Tiến Dũng

Area
  - Rural District: 159 km^{2} (61 sq mi)

Population (2019)
  - Rural District: 75,176
  - Urban: 13,666
  - Metro: 61,610
- Time zone: UTC+7 (Indochina Time)
- ZIP code: 48350 (Note: From December 31, 2022 to June 31, 2025.)
- Area code: 466
- Website: Giolinh.Quangtri.gov.vn; Giolinh.Quangtri.dcs.vn

Gio Linh is a former rural district of Quảng Trị province in the North Central Coast region of Vietnam.

== History ==
Its name Gio Linh /jɜːlɪŋ/ or sometimes Do Linh (由靈 from Đại Nam nhất thống chí) in modern-Vietnamese language was originated from an ancient area of Champa, which was Ulik /uːlɪk/. (Note: Trần Kỳ Phương, Bước đầu xác định danh hiệu các tù trưởng quốc thuộc miền Bắc vương quốc cổ Chiêm Thành khoảng giữa thế kỷ XI-XV (Preliminary study of the names of the chiefdoms in the Northern part of the old Cham Kingdom from 11th to 15th century), Tạp chí Nghiên cứu và Phát triển, số 54, Hà Nội, 2006.) This old domain corresponds to all of districts Gio Linh and Vĩnh Linh and a small part of Triệu Phong district today.

=== Middle Ages ===
According to an agreement reached in 1306, Cham king Jaya Simhavarman III ceded two prefectures Ulik and Vuyar in the Northern part of Champa to Annamese emperor Trần Anh Tông in exchange for the wedding with a younger sister of the emperor, Princess Huyền Trân. Experiencing many names, from Ma Linh to Minh Linh (Later Lê Dynasty), or Chiêu Linh to Vĩnh Linh (Nguyễn Dynasty), in the end, the name of Gio Linh has been used for the longest.

For some centuries this domain has almost no interest to exploit. Its residents were mostly Hroi people (người Hời), besides, a few Annamese border guards (lính thú). It was only actually recorded as the period of the Nguyễn Phúc clan, or XVI century. It belonged to one of the three basic lands (đất căn bản) of the Nguyễn Lords, which has been included modern Quảng Trị, Huế, Quảng Nam. The residents from Gio Linh rural district have received priority to be selected as guards and servants in the Citadel of Phú Xuân. However, the majority of the rural district's people only liked fishing, which was identified by explorer Sir John Barrow in the late 18th century.

In 1831 Emperor Minh Mệnh issued a document to separate the Northern part of Gio Linh into a new district, Chiêu Linh.

=== 20th century ===
During the Indochina War, it was a very fierce fighting place of the French Legionary Forces with the Việt-Minh guerrilla groups. According to the memoirs of composer Phạm Duy, French soldiers including white and black skin caused many massacre and worse rape in each sweeping batch. There were even some villages that no longer have male persons because of the cruelty of paratroopers. (Note: Memoirs of Phạm Duy in Vietnamese, chapters 28 and 29.) That is what touched him to compose the famous song The Mother of Gio Linh (Bà mẹ Gio Linh).

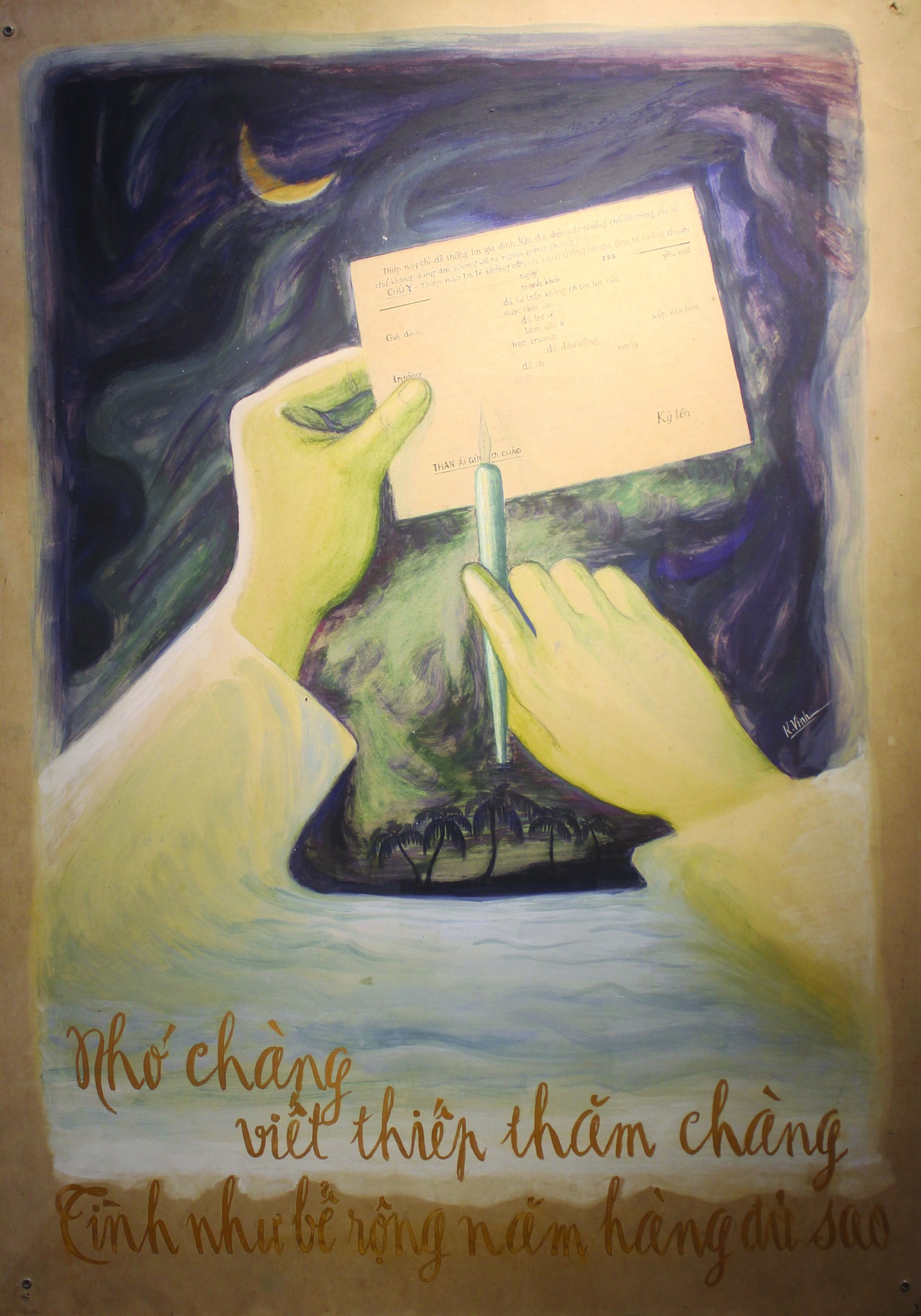
The propaganda poster from North Vietnam in the standard form of the crossing postcard.

From the spirit of the Geneva Agreement in 1954, the area of Gio Linh rural district was located on the South of the 17th parallel, so it automatically became part of DMZ. Because Hiền Lương Bridge from Vĩnh Linh district (North) to Gio Linh district (South) was the only place that Vietnam's two regions can interact with each other, Gio Linh was entrusted by the Government of the Republic of Vietnam : Becoming a place to receive and deliver "postcards what crossing the border" (bưu-thiệp vượt tuyến). This was a humanitarian support program for families with people living in both regions, who were allowed to contact each other in a limited manner through a letter of censorship. However, this program was really suspended in 1964, when the Vietnam War began.

From 1967 until Vietnam was completely unified, Gio Linh area was deleted its demilitarized status to return to the dangerous fighting zone. Therefore, Gio Linh was the site of the northernmost Allied position during the Vietnam War. It was under the command of the 12th Marine, and the 1967 hill commander was then USMC Major Alfred M. Gray, Jr. who eventually retired in 1991 as General and Commandant of the USMC. The position was on highway 1 and expanded on an existing 1950-era French fort, which was Tà Cơn. The fort was occupied by a company of the Army of Vietnam First Division. The USMC command had a typical unit strength ranging from 200 to 600 men, depending on the believed level of ground assault risk. During the period April 1967 to September 1967 they suffered 28 killed and 200 wounded. This event was remembered in the historical documents of the Vietnam People's Army as "Victory of Gio An", although it really had a local significance of tactics at that time.

In the period from 1971 to 1973, Gio Linh along with Cam Lộ and Đông Hà were the three main battlefields of the Quảng Trị conflict. According to memoir Fiery Summer (Saigon, 1973) by author Phan Nhật Nam, the participants "if they want to be injured, it is too easy; because they just raise their fingers through the mouth of the cellar to be shot". According to BBC and AP's reports, President Nguyễn Văn Thiệu's War Cabinet has mobilized the most warlike divisions to the fighting area. From January 25 to 31, 1973, the Republic of Vietnam Marine Division conducted the Tango City operations under the US fire support to recapture Cửa Việt Port from the North forces. These efforts were to increase the advantage at the Paris Peace Conference. However, in the end, both sides declared victory.

On March 11, 1977, according to Decision 62-CP of the Government of Vietnam, three rural districts of Vĩnh Linh, Gio Linh and Cam Lộ were merged to become Bến Hải Rural District. By March 23, 1990, according to Decision 91-HĐBT of dividing districts Bến Hải and Triệu Hải, Gio Linh was re-established from Bến Hải district.

=== 21st century ===
According to Decision 42/2015/QĐ-TTg of Prime Minister Nguyễn Tấn Dũng on the establishment of the Southeast Economic Zone of Quảng Trị Province (Khu Kinh-tế Đông-nam Quảng-trị, KKT DNQT), what was issued on November 3, 2015, including 17 communes and townships, of which Gio Linh rural district has 4 communes Gio Quang, Gio Mai, Gio Hải, Gio Việt, and Cửa Việt township.

Therefore, the Cửa Việt Tourism Service Area (Khu phức-hợp dịch-vụ du-lịch Cửa-Việt) will be built and raised internationally, gradually from 2015 to 2035.

To meet the project to arrange and merge administrative units by the Government of Vietnam, Gio Linh Rural District was officially dissolved from 00:00, June 1, 2025. Its name is still reserved with its cultural and historical significance to become Gio Linh Commune.

== Geography ==
=== Administration ===
The area of Gio Linh rural district is located on the National Route 1 of Vietnam. It borders Vĩnh Linh district to the North and Đông Hà to the South. In foreign relations, Gio Linh has long been a very important transit port (cảng trung chuyển) of Laos, a neighboring country without the sea.

On November 14, 2024, the National Assembly Standing Committee issued Resolution 1281/NQ-UBTVQH15 on the Arrangement of communal administrative units in Quảng Trị province in the period of 2023–2025. Accordingly, Gio Linh rural district includes :

- 2 townships : Gio Linh (capital), Cửa Việt.
- 12 communes : Gio An, Gio Hải, Gio Mai, Gio Mỹ, Gio Quang, Gio Sơn, Hải Thái, Linh Trường, Phong Bình, Trung Giang, Trung Hải, Trung Sơn.

=== Society ===
According to 2019 statistics there are all 75,296 people in Gio Linh rural district. However, due to the not high educational and economic conditions compared to the common ground of Quảng Trị province, the population growth rate in the rural district is almost negligible.

Southwest Parish (giáo xứ Nam Tây) is under Quảng Trị Deanery, what is located in the area of two communes Gio Sơn and Hải Thái. Its patrol saint was Virgin Mary. According to historical documents, Southwest residents are the thought to have received the Gospel in 1615 and mostly associated with the establishment of the Đàng Trong Church. But it was not until 1659 that the Jesuit priests founded a community, which was called Mai Xá Rú, an unknown word. By 1685, the representatives of the Paris Foreign Missions Society changed its name to Southwest.

The current priest is Bishop Peter Huỳnh Văn Nguyên, who has been inaugurated at the Mass of July 29, 2015. Besides, the number of parishioners in 2019 reached about 72,000 of the 4 parish areas.

== Culture ==
According to the Đại Nam nhất thống chí (Nguyễn Dynasty's national atlas), At the time of the Nguyễn Lords began to explore Đàng Trong, the main component of Gio Linh was the Hroi, the Tanka and a very small number of Kẻ Trại. Through the next migrations, this area had groups of Mường and Thái. The new and old groups of people are very small, so they quickly mixed with each other to survive on a relatively dry land. Until the 1946 census of the independent and unified Vietnam, all the persons in Gio Linh rural district were registered as Kinh people. Currently, the Gio Linh local language still retains many words as a derivative form of Cham, Cantonese and Tai.

=== Arts ===
Since 1948, in the Vietnamese literature and performing arts, there is a trend of writing about the place name of Gio Linh rural district, which has suffered a lot of pain during the 30 years of the Indochina War.

Literature

- Phan Nhật Nam's three memoirs : Dọc đường số Một (Along Highway One), Ải trần gian (Hell on Earth), Mùa hè đỏ lửa (Summer of Raging Fire).
- Nguyễn Minh Châu's two novels : Cỏ lau (Switchgrasses), Miền cháy (Fire Land).
- Chu Lai's play : Khúc tráng ca ngày ấy (Magnanimous Melodies for Those Days).

Music

- Phạm Duy's three songs : Bà mẹ Gio Linh (The Mother of Gio Linh), Bà mẹ quê (The Village Mother), Mẹ trùng dương (The Maritime Mother).
- Lam Phương's song : Chuyến đò vĩ tuyến (The Boat Crosses the Parallel).
- Trúc Phương's song : Trên bốn vùng chiến thuật (At the Four Tactical Zones).
- Lê Minh Bằng's song : Thương về vùng hỏa tuyến (Love for the Free Fire Zone).
- Trịnh Công Sơn's song : Hát trên những xác người (Sing on the Corpses).
- Hoàng Hiệp's two songs : Câu hò bên bờ Hiền Lương (Singing at the Hiền Lương River Side), (Note: Melody by Hoàng Hiệp and poem by Đằng Giao in Hanoi 1956.) Cô gái vót chông (The Girl is Strong).
- The Political Education Department's two songs : Ta sẽ về Đông Hà (We will Return to Đông Hà), Giờ phản công (Time of Counterattack).
- Tô Kiều Ngân and Trương Hoàng Xuân's song : Cờ ta bay trên Quảng Trị thân yêu (Our Flags Over the Beloved Citadel). (Note: With their pen name Lê-kim-Hoa to celebrate the victory of the Republic of Vietnam Military Forces in summer 1972.)
- Trần Hoàn's song : Quảng Trị yêu thương (Beloved Quảng Trị).
- Nguyễn Chí Quý's poem and Cương Huyền's song : Mời anh về Gio Linh quê em (Please Visit My Homeland Gio Linh).

=== Tourism ===
The striped snakehead is not only economic significance because of its high productivity and profit, but also considered the latest symbol of modern culture in Gio Linh rural district. According to local legends, this specialty was previously called as "royal fish" (cá tiến vua), because it was used to release the normal meals of the Nguyễn Dynasty.

Besides, the custom of whale worship (lễ nghinh Ông) is also a unique feature of Gio Linh rural district. However, it has really been faded since the 2000s, which has not yet taken measures to recover.

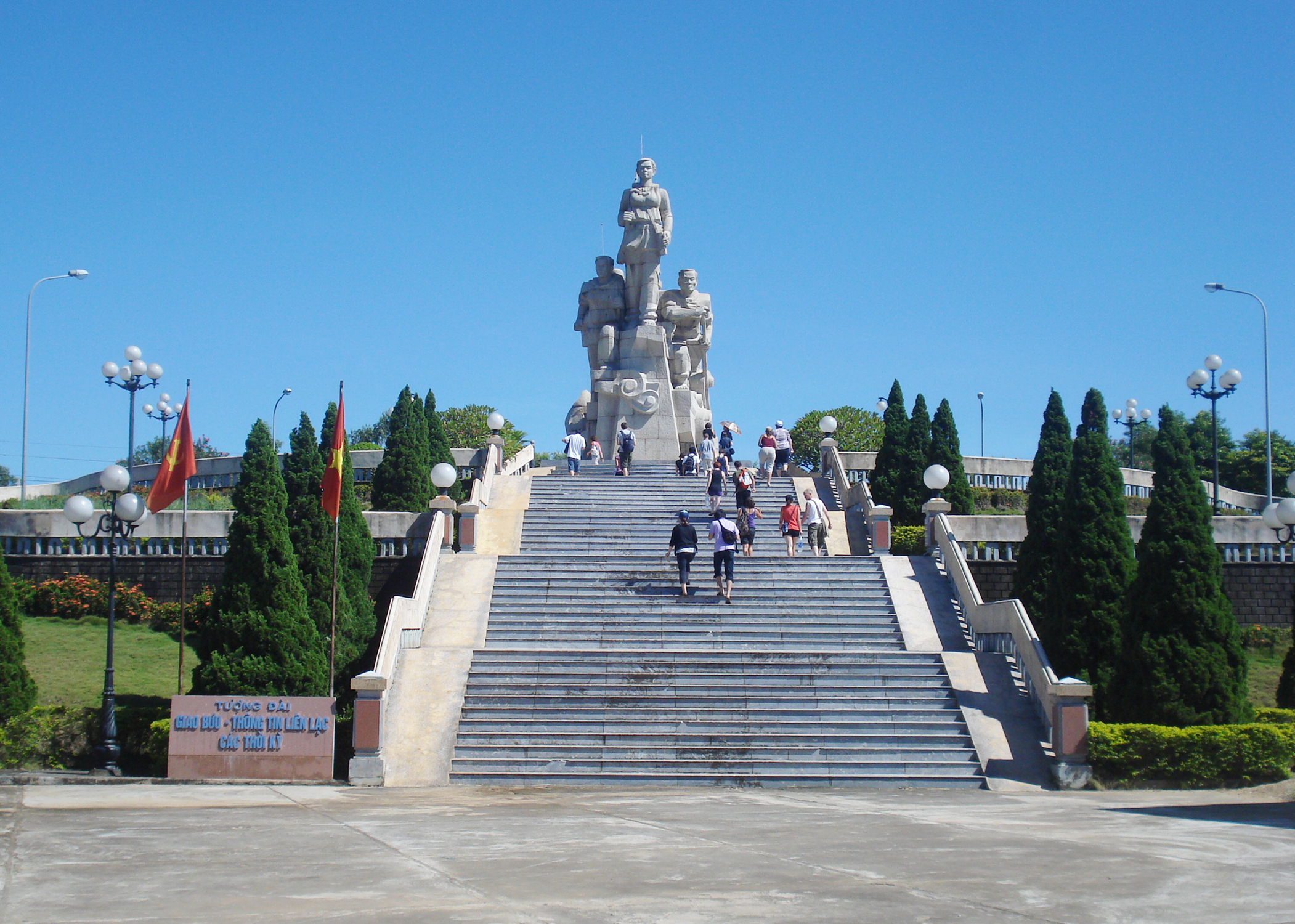
The Post Office monument.

Hiền Lương Bridge in the fact was collapsed in 1967 by bombs, but it was entrusted by the Government of Vietnam to Quảng Trị Provincial People's Committee for restoration from 2001 to 2008. By 2005, the Hiền Lương – Bến Hải National Historical Site (Di tích lịch sử Đôi bờ Hiền Lương – Bến Hải) was especially officially established. Its area spreads from the communes of Vĩnh Thành, Vĩnh Giang, Vĩnh Sơn and Cửa Tùng township to Trung Hải commune. This monument has been used for traditional education and historical-cultural tourism since 2010s. It has been ranked as a special monument by the Ministry of Culture and Information of Vietnam and is also considered one of the "red addresses" (địa-chỉ đỏ) of the whole Vietnam.

== Economy ==
Since the 2000s the Gio Linh Rural District People's Committee has determined the exploitation of the potential and strengths of their economy, which takes the sea and sand as the main direction to be able to promote both the economy and society in development.

The total annual production value in the whole area increased from 13 to 15%. Gio Linh is one of the rural districts with a fleet of fishing from offshore to the nearest shore in Quảng Trị province with 764 ships of all kinds, total capacity of over 45,000 CV, including 155 offshore ships. The total output of fishing annually reaches over 14,000 tons, of which 5,000 tons for the export. Fish sauce, dried fish, jellyfish, small shrimp, squid... processed in Gio Linh waters have become a strong brand in Vietnam market.

Only in 2019 there were two solar power projects implemented in Gio Thành commune (now belonging to Gio Hải commune) with a total investment of nearly 550 billions Vietnam dongs. Thereby, three solar factories were enough to provide electricity to the entire civil field of Quảng Trị province. The planned Quảng Trị Airport will be also constructed in Gio Quang commune.

Besides, the former Cồn Tiên – Dốc Miếu Military Base Complex, which was founded by the McNamara Line Electronic Barrier program, soon became an industrial crop area for high yields in the whole province. The three types of industrial crops are very important for Gio Linh district's economy, which has been planted by the appropriate terrain and soil quality: Rubber, pepper and tea.

== See also ==
- Cồn Cỏ
- Triệu Phong
- Vĩnh Linh
