= Vĩnh Linh district =

Coordinates: 17.083°N 107.000°E

Vĩnh Linh district Huyện Vĩnh Linh
- District
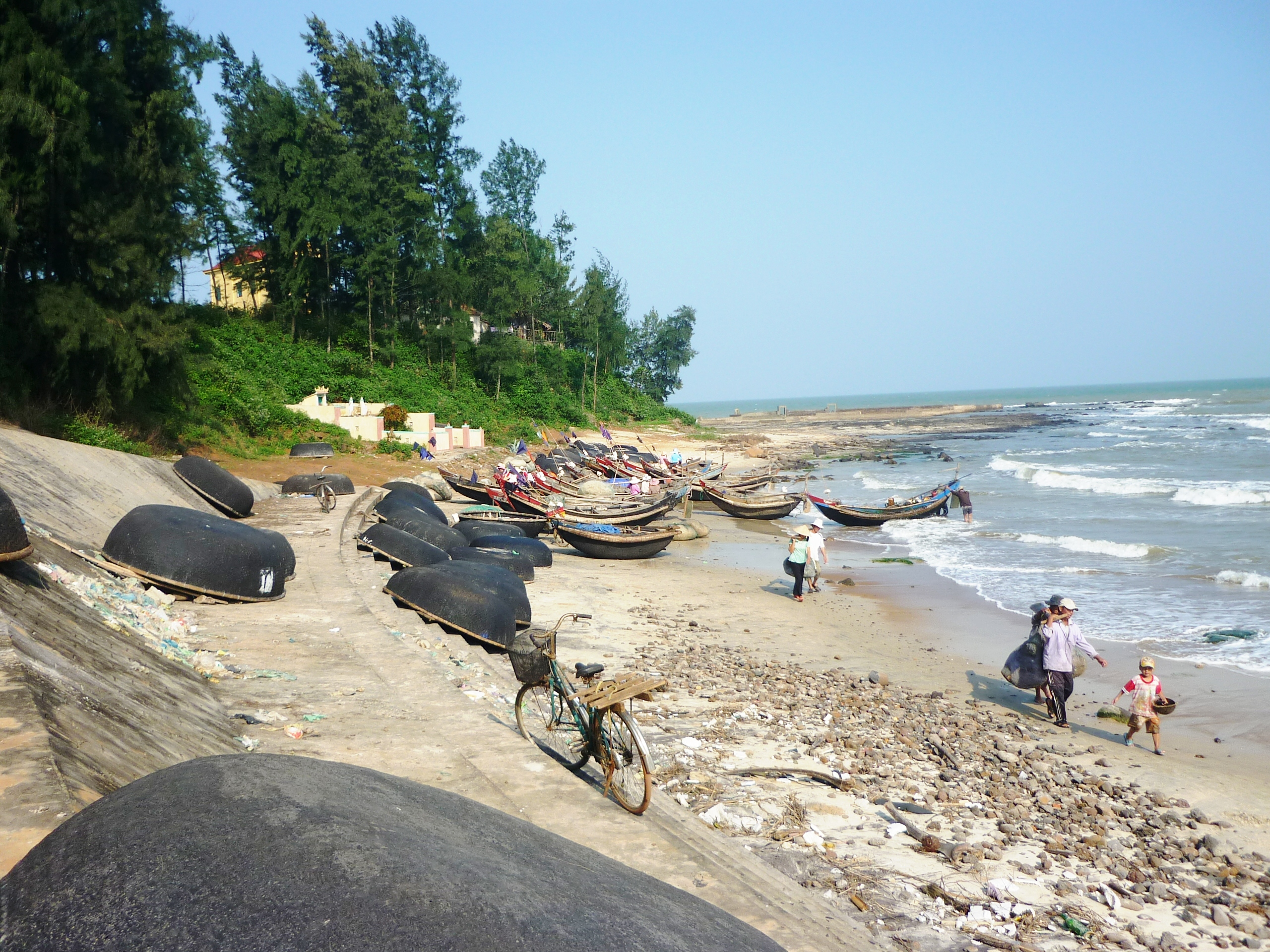
- A corner of Vịnh Mốc fishing village

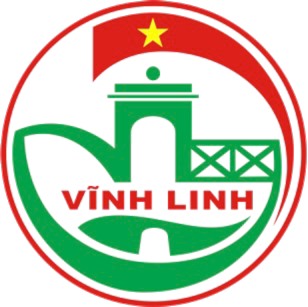
- Seal
- Interactive map of Vĩnh Linh district
- Country: Vietnam
- Region: North Central Coast
- Province: Quảng Trị
- Capital: Hồ Xá

Area
  - Total: 240 sq mi (620 km^{2})

Population (2003)
  - Total: 88,243
- Time zone: UTC+7 (UTC + 7)

Vĩnh Linh is a former rural district of Quảng Trị province in the North Central Coast region of Vietnam. A coastal district, it is bordered to the east by the South China Sea, to the south by Gio Linh district, to the southwest by Hướng Hóa district, and to the north by Quảng Bình province (Lệ Thủy district).

== Administrative divisions ==
The district is subdivided into 3 townships (Bến Quan, Cửa Tùng and the district seat Hồ Xá) and 19 communes: Vĩnh Ô, Vĩnh Khê, Vĩnh Hà, Vĩnh Long, Vĩnh Chấp, Vĩnh Lâm, Vĩnh Sơn, Vĩnh Thủy, Vĩnh Nam, Vĩnh Trung, Vĩnh Tú, Vĩnh Thái, Vĩnh Hiền, Vĩnh Hòa, Vĩnh Thạch, Vĩnh Kim, Vĩnh Giang, Vĩnh Tân, Vĩnh Thành. Vinh Linh was the site of the Seventeenth parallel, the temporary borderline between North Vietnam and South Vietnam in Vietnam War and suffered heavy bombardment by the USA. The Bến Hải River and Hiền Lương Bridge are located here. The National Route 1 and North–South Railway cross Vinh Linh. As of 2003 the district had a population of 88,243. The district covers an area of 647 km^{2}. The district capital lies at Hồ Xá. Around 1,000 of the population are Montagnards.

== History ==
The district was formerly known as Ma Linh, Chiêu Linh, Minh Lương and Minh Linh. The first two names were used when the area was part of Champa before the southwards expansion of Vietnam. In 1831, the Nguyễn dynasty established Quảng Trị province, and made Vinh Linh the administrative headquarters. The district was split during the Partition of Vietnam.

In 2004 Cồn Cỏ island was split out of the district to become its own district.

The district has locations that are heritage-listed, including some of a national level of importance, such as the Hiền Lương shores, Vịnh Mốc tunnels, Hiền Lương Bridge and Bến Hải River

== Economy ==
The old-growth forest of Ru Linh and the Cua Tung beach are also in the district. Agriculture is the main economic activity in the area, accounting for 51% of the production. Industry accounts for 28% and tertiary activities 21%. The main products include prawns, rice, pepper, rubber, mahogany and ironwood.
