= Hiền Lương Bridge =

Hiền Lương Bridge Cầu Hiền Lương
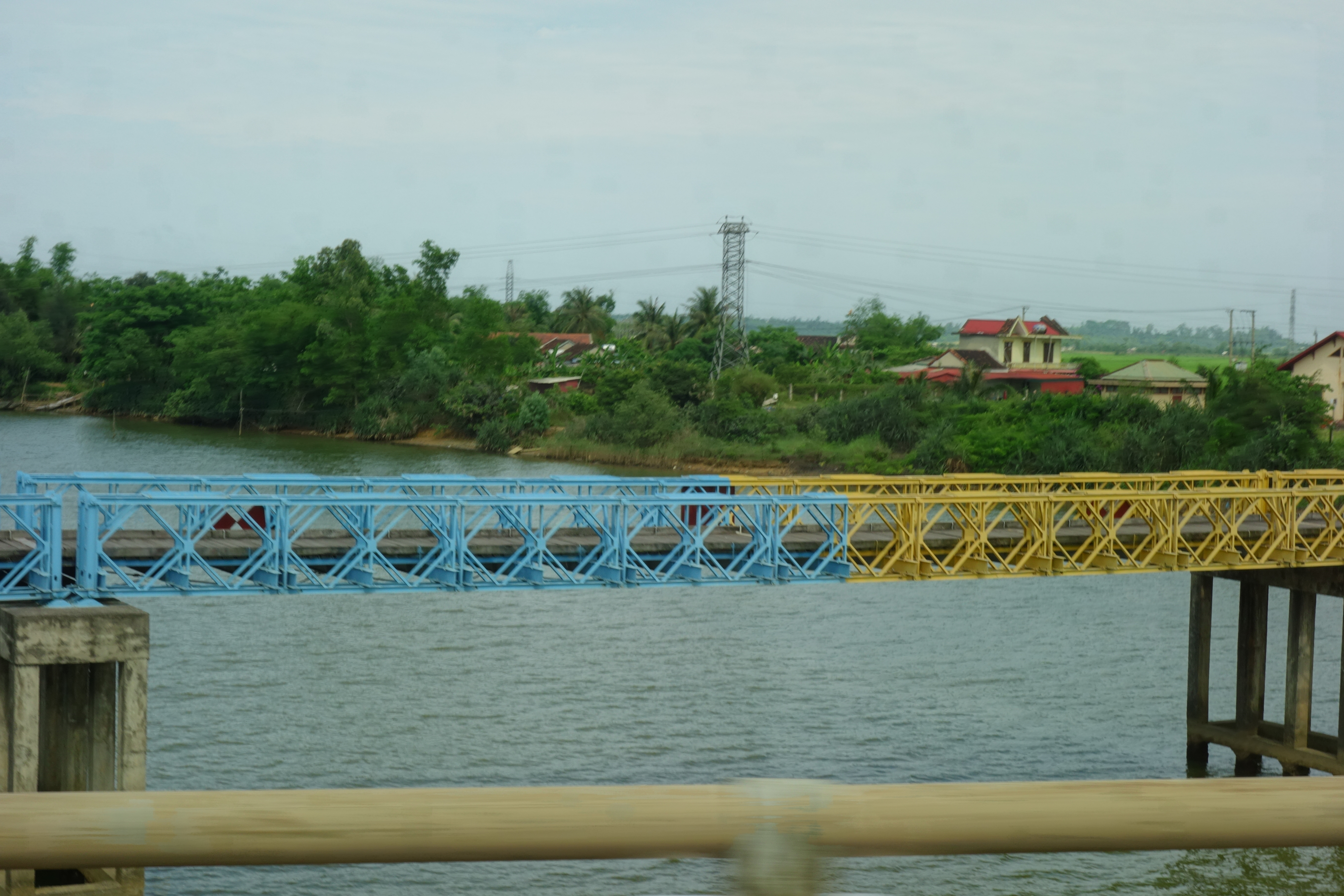
- Hiền Lương Bridge (Blue is North and Yellow is South)
- Coordinates: 17°00′16″N 107°03′06″E
- Carries: AH1
- Crosses: Bến Hải River
- Locale: Hiền Lương village, Hiền Thành commune, Vĩnh Linh district, Quảng Trị province

History
- Opened: 1952
- Rebuilt: 2003

Location
- Interactive map of Hiền Lương Bridge

The Hiền Lương Bridge (Vietnamese: Cầu Hiền Lương) is a bridge over Bến Hải River, Vĩnh Linh District, Quảng Trị Province, North Central Coast, Việt Nam. Located at the 17th Parallel, it was bisected by the border between South Vietnam and North Vietnam during the Vietnam War, from 1954 to 1975.

== History ==
Being located at the inter-Vietnamese border splitting the country into warring halves, the Hiền Lương bridge witnessed symbolic and propaganda conflicts between the two sides of the war. Both South Vietnam and North Vietnam deployed huge high-powered speakers to broadcast their message as far as possible. Moreover, whenever the South Vietnamese repainted their part of the bridge, the North Vietnamese also repainted their part with the very same color, to signify their will to unify the Vietnamese nation.

Both sides also built massive flag poles in a race of size and height, ending with a 38.6-meter height pole built by the North. After this, the South attempted to destroy the opposing flag by intense airstrikes and naval bombardment. Later during the 1965-68 American bombardment campaign, the DRV flags were also targeted many times by American airstrikes. The 1967 bombing destroyed both the bridge and the flag pole. The DRV responded by rebuilding a new temporary flag pole every time the old one was destroyed. Sewing machines were sent to the frontline to reduce the required manufacturing time. Local people also assisted the sewing, with two women tailors named Trần Thị Viễn and Ngô Thị Diễm being made Hero of the People's Armed Forces for their significant contributions to the task.

American bombs completely destroyed the Hiền Lương bridge in 1967. Temporary pontoon bridges were used before a proper replacement bridge was built adjacent to the original crossing in 1974, in order to support military logistics during the 1975 spring offensive. It was opened to public use following reunification in 1975 as part of National Route 1, and was rebuilt to modern standards in 1996.

The original Hiền Lương bridge was rebuilt as a pedestrian crossing at its historic location in 2003, designed as an exact replica of the 1952 French concrete-and-wood bridge. The bridge's northern and southern halves were painted in blue and yellow respectively in 2014, replicating its divided appearance during the Vietnam War.

== Gallery ==
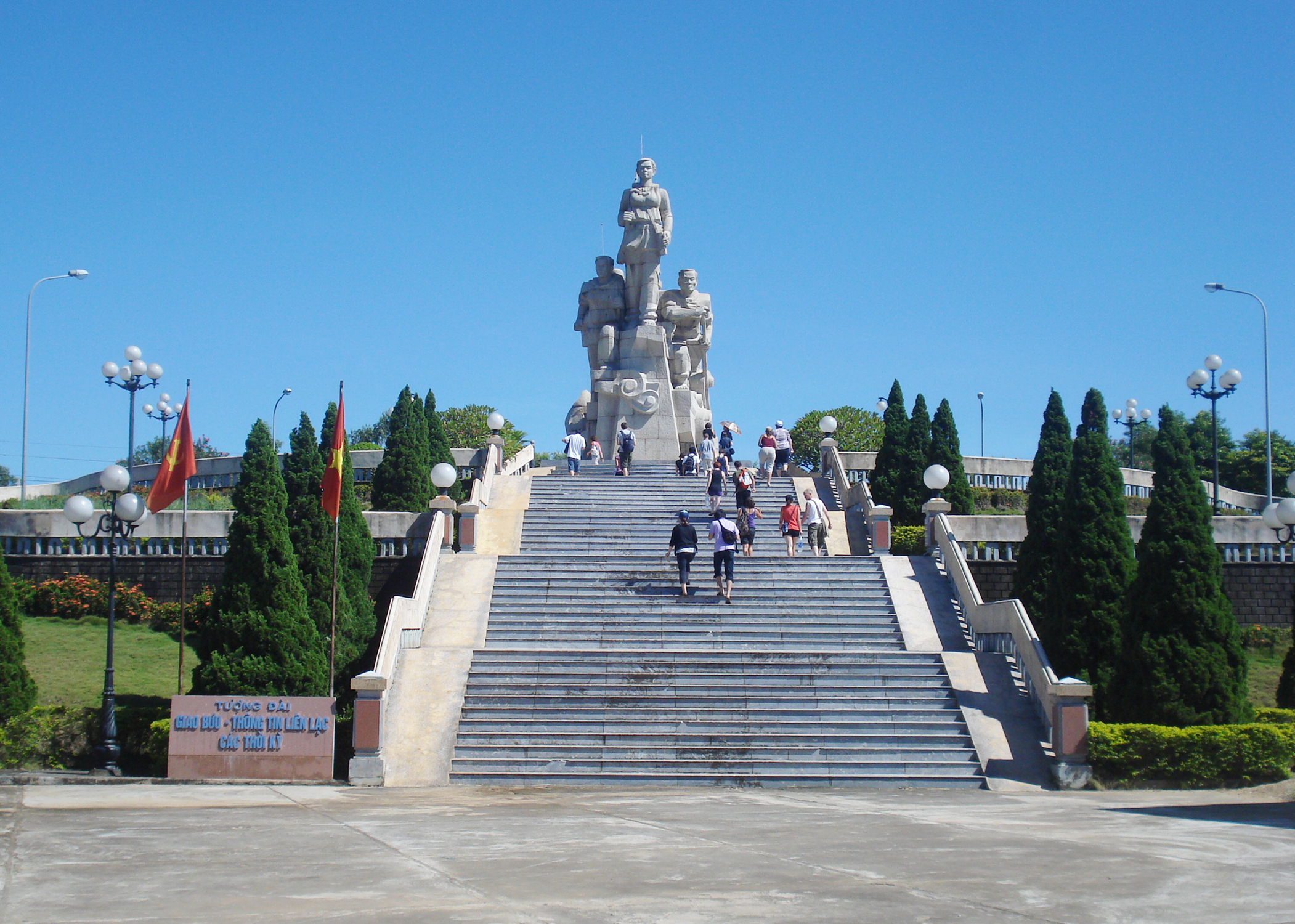
Postal Delivery and Radio Communications Monument on the south bank

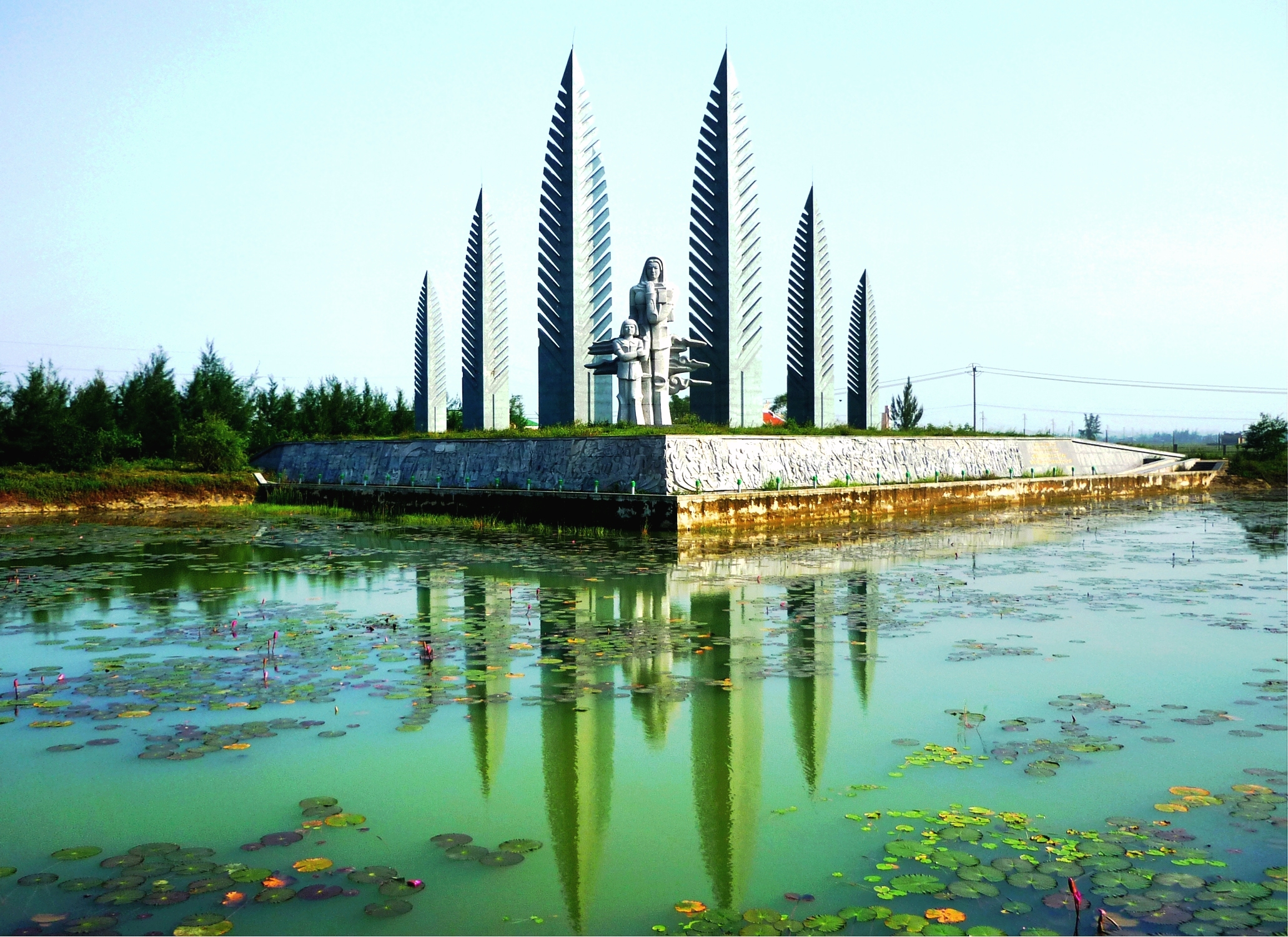
"Aspiring to Reunification" Monument on the south bank, built 2002

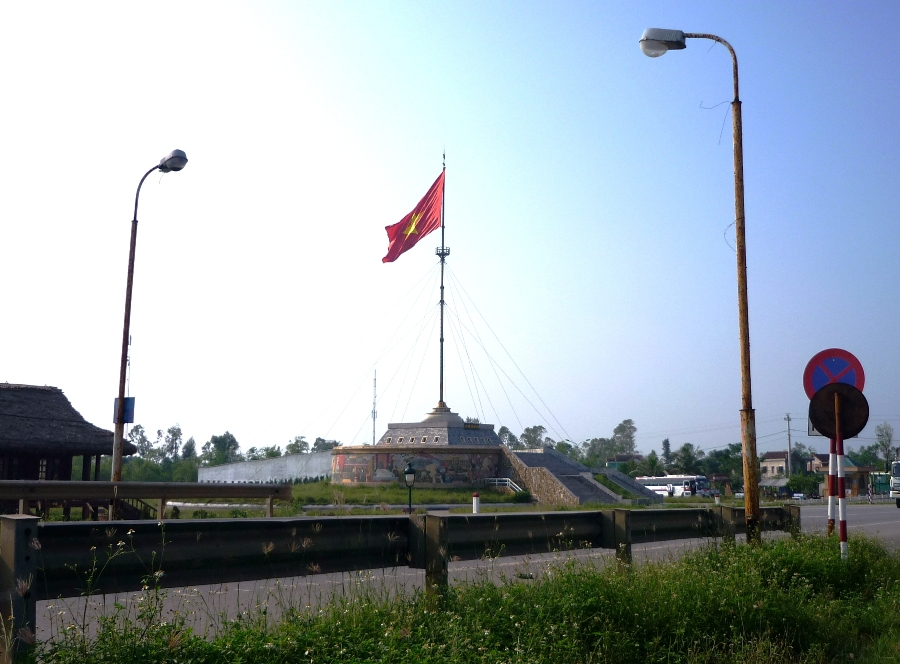
Monumental Vietnamese flagpole on the north bank, built 2005
