= Cồn Cỏ =

Coordinates: 17°10′N 107°21′E

Cồn Cỏ Đặc khu Cồn Cỏ
- Special administrative region
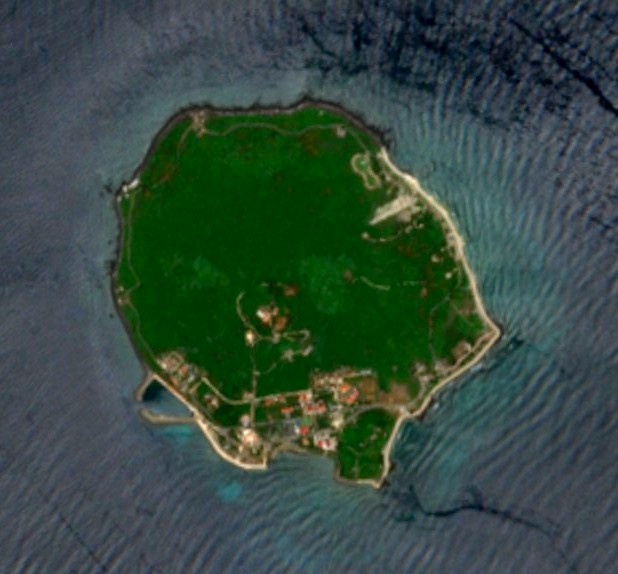
- Satellite image of Cồn Cỏ Island.
- Nicknames: "The Jade" (Viên ngọc xanh) "The Outport of the East Sea" (Tiền đồn biển Đông)
- Motto: "Brighten the future" (Bừng sáng tương lai)
- Interactive map of Cồn Cỏ
- Country: Vietnam
- Region: North Central Coast
- Province: Quảng Trị
- Establishment: October 1, 2004

Government
  - People Committee's Chairman: Võ Viết Cường
  - People Council's chairman: Nguyễn Văn Thành
  - Front Committee's chairman: Nguyễn Lê Tài
  - Party Committee's Secretary: Võ Viết Cường

Area
  - Total: 2.3 km^{2} (0.89 sq mi)

Population (2023)
  - Total: 400
  - Density: 170/km^{2} (450/sq mi)
- Time zone: UTC+7 (Indochina Time)
- ZIP code: 48950
- Website: conco.quangtri.gov.vn

Cồn Cỏ is a special administrative region of Quảng Trị province in the North Central Coast region of Vietnam.

== History ==
Cồn Cỏ is an island and is located 27 km to the east of Mũi Lay, what is the farthest place in the east of Quảng Trị mainland.

=== Middle Ages ===
By recent archaeological work, in the Bến Nghè area of the island, there are rock artefacts believed to date to the Stone Age, tens of thousands of years ago. In the first few centuries CE, Areca Tribes inhabited the island.

According to local legends, the last Cham residents left the island in the 18th century to yield Kinh groups settling down. There were no conflicts that occurred, because the water source and survival conditions in this island are inherently limited. Excavations undertaken in 1994 show that during the 17th and 18th centuries, the island was a stopover point for Vietnamese sea merchants.

During the time of the Nguyễn dynasty, the island was used to imprison convicts, and some objects such as chains and metal clasps have been found there.

=== 20th century ===
Due to its proximity to the Vietnamese Demilitarized Zone, during the Vietnam War, Tigris Insula was used as a base for North Vietnamese military forces.

On 14 March 1965 the island was attacked by Republic of Vietnam Air Force A-1 Skyraiders.

On 27 June 1972, North Vietnamese coastal artillery on Cồn Cỏ Island fired on US warships, including USS Blue Ridge, supporting a landing of South Vietnamese Marines near the Cửa Việt River.

After Vietnam reunited (July 2, 1976), Cồn Cỏ Island was part of Vĩnh Quang commune, Vĩnh Linh district, Quảng Trị province. Because this area has a special defense and security, it has not had any level of civil government. Instead, it was the direct management of a command of a naval battalion ("bộ tư lịnh hải quân Cồn Cỏ", then "ban chỉ huy quân sự hải đảo Cồn Cỏ"). Besides, Cồn Cỏ Airport (phi cảng Cồn Cỏ) and aviation activities are under the control of the air force.

=== 21st century ===
According to Decree No. 174/2004/ND-CP of the Government of Vietnam, which was issued on October 1, 2004, Vĩnh Quang commune was renamed Cửa Tùng township, but Cồn Cỏ Island was separated from Vĩnh Linh area to become into Cồn Cỏ Island District.

Since November 2015, Cồn Cỏ has been converted from the regulation of military island to civil island. This has allowed the normalization of commercial and tourism activities.

According to the orientation of the Provincial People's Committee, what was proposed in an interdisciplinary meeting in November 2024, Cồn Cỏ and the surrounding waters will be a key economic zone (mô hình kinh tế trọng điểm) of the whole Quảng Trị in the period from 2025 to 2035. Accordingly, the provincial authorities will deduce and invite investment to bring Cồn Cỏ Island into a port. Also according to this resolution, the future of the inhabitants on the island must face a challenge that they want to develop a multi-service economy and to protect the ecological environment. In particular, the problem of electricity and soft drinks has not yet been properly solved.

== Geography ==
=== Topography ===
Map of Cồn Cỏ Island.

Cồn Cỏ Island has an area of 2.3 km^{2} (0.89 sq mi), the isometric form of hills, the highest peak of 63m. This is a young volcanic island, composed of basalt and basalt tuff stones of Neogene – Quaternary age.

Before it became its own district, the island was in the commune of Vĩnh Quang, in Vĩnh Linh district of Quảng Trị Province. The island became a district through Decree 174/2004 NĐ-CP of October 1, 2004. Province officials held a ceremony to create the district on April 18, 2005.

As of 2023 the district had a population of 400. The district covers an area of 2.3 km^{2}, making one of the smallest districts in Vietnam. The district capital lies at Đảo Cồn Cỏ.

=== Climate ===
Climate data for Cồn Cỏ
| Month | Jan | Feb | Mar | Apr | May | Jun | Jul | Aug | Sep | Oct | Nov | Dec | Year |
|---|---|---|---|---|---|---|---|---|---|---|---|---|---|
| Record high °C (°F) | 31.6 (88.9) | 34.2 (93.6) | 34.2 (93.6) | 35.8 (96.4) | 38.6 (101.5) | 38.4 (101.1) | 37.8 (100.0) | 38.1 (100.6) | 37.5 (99.5) | 34.2 (93.6) | 31.6 (88.9) | 30.7 (87.3) | 38.6 (101.5) |
| Mean daily maximum °C (°F) | 23.0 (73.4) | 23.2 (73.8) | 24.8 (76.6) | 27.7 (81.9) | 31.1 (88.0) | 33.0 (91.4) | 33.1 (91.6) | 32.7 (90.9) | 30.8 (87.4) | 28.9 (84.0) | 26.7 (80.1) | 24.0 (75.2) | 28.3 (82.9) |
| Daily mean °C (°F) | 20.7 (69.3) | 20.9 (69.6) | 22.2 (72.0) | 24.8 (76.6) | 27.8 (82.0) | 29.5 (85.1) | 29.6 (85.3) | 29.4 (84.9) | 28.1 (82.6) | 26.6 (79.9) | 24.6 (76.3) | 22.0 (71.6) | 25.5 (77.9) |
| Mean daily minimum °C (°F) | 18.9 (66.0) | 19.2 (66.6) | 20.4 (68.7) | 22.8 (73.0) | 25.4 (77.7) | 27.2 (81.0) | 27.2 (81.0) | 27.1 (80.8) | 25.8 (78.4) | 24.5 (76.1) | 22.9 (73.2) | 20.4 (68.7) | 23.5 (74.3) |
| Record low °C (°F) | 10.7 (51.3) | 13.3 (55.9) | 12.4 (54.3) | 17.1 (62.8) | 19.3 (66.7) | 22.7 (72.9) | 22.6 (72.7) | 23.5 (74.3) | 21.0 (69.8) | 18.7 (65.7) | 14.2 (57.6) | 11.1 (52.0) | 10.7 (51.3) |
| Average precipitation mm (inches) | 147.9 (5.82) | 69.1 (2.72) | 62.7 (2.47) | 58.6 (2.31) | 81.0 (3.19) | 72.9 (2.87) | 65.9 (2.59) | 172.5 (6.79) | 426.5 (16.79) | 512.2 (20.17) | 317.0 (12.48) | 237.5 (9.35) | 2,223.8 (87.55) |
| Average rainy days | 15.8 | 13.0 | 11.5 | 8.3 | 7.8 | 4.7 | 4.7 | 8.2 | 14.9 | 19.2 | 17.8 | 18.4 | 144.7 |
| Average relative humidity (%) | 89.6 | 92.2 | 92.6 | 91.2 | 86.0 | 78.9 | 76.9 | 78.1 | 82.7 | 85.0 | 84.4 | 86.0 | 85.4 |
| Mean monthly sunshine hours | 89.6 | 107.6 | 148.0 | 142.2 | 248.7 | 259.9 | 277.8 | 215.0 | 173.9 | 95.1 | 82.3 | 91.6 | 1,931.4 |
Source: Vietnam Institute for Building Science and Technology

== Culture ==
Because Cồn Cỏ area was quite high in defense, it was less known for decades. Starting in the 2000s, only one service is called Cồn Cỏ Tourism with the function of bringing visitors to Cồn Cỏ and promoting its beauty to the outside.

Every year, every April is the beginning of the Cồn Cỏ tourist season. Tourists are taken to the island to attend the memorial service for those who are still alive (lễ truy điệu sống), a custom that is thought to have been existed for a long time. These are the people who are going to board a fishing boat in the ocean or are about to go to the battle. Their fate is considered to be very scary but also full of glory. Therefore, the memorial service is the way that relatives text them that they will never be forgotten.

Until the time of COVID-19 pandemic, the most typical cultural work on Cồn Cỏ Island was just Hoa Phong Ba Kindergarten and Primary School ("the stormy flower"), what was built all 5 billion Vietnam dongs by the Petroleum Drilling and Drilling Corporation from 2011 to 2015. This was also known as one of the rare areas in Vietnam almost no infection from COVID-19.

== See also ==
- Palao Campa
- Lý Sơn
- Phú Quý
