= Mai Xá, Gio Mai =

Coordinates: 16.8787°N 107.1325°E

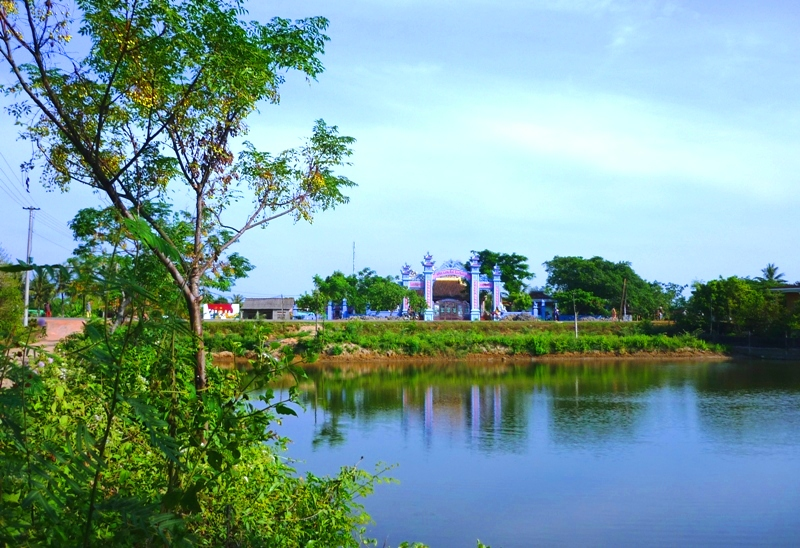
Panorama of Mai Xá Chánh Communal House – the symbol of village

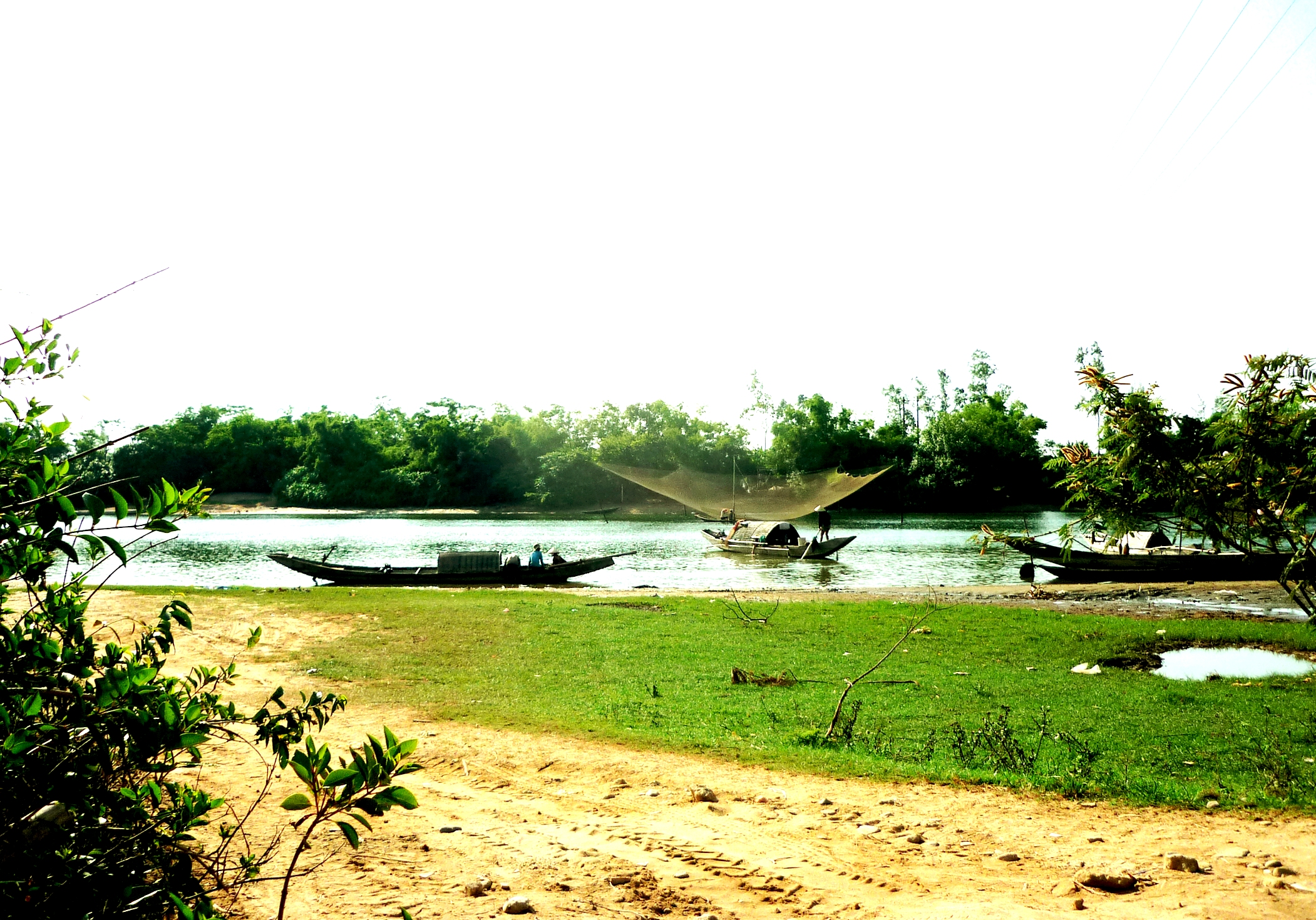
Fishing on Hiếu River.

Mai Xá is an ancient village in Gio Mai Commune, Gio Linh District, Quảng Trị Province, Vietnam.

== Images ==
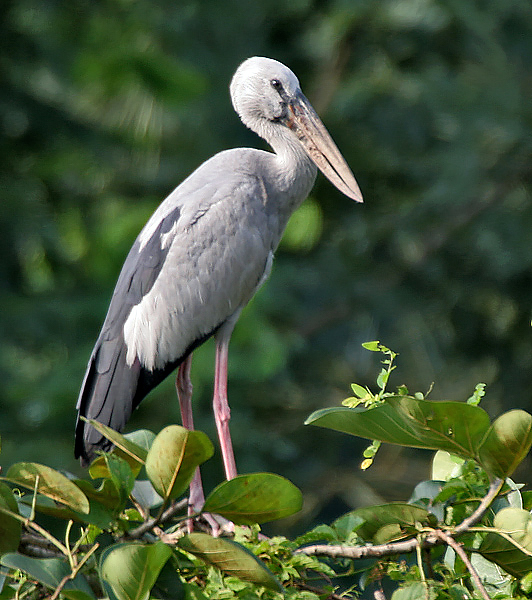
Stork

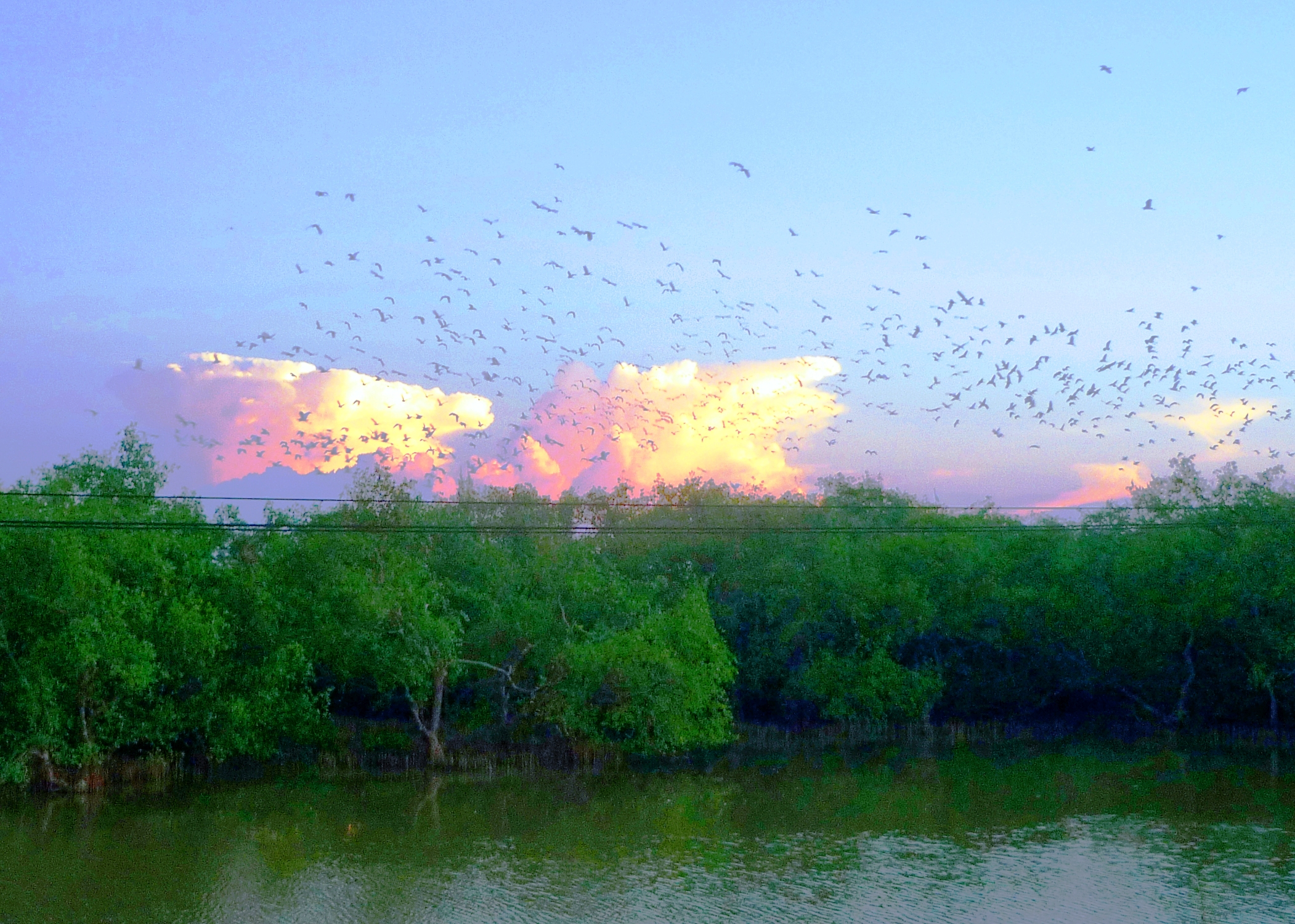
White Stork on Hà Cộc at sunset

== See also ==
- Vietnam War
- Tourism in Vietnam
