= Vịnh Mốc tunnels =

Tunnel complex in Quảng Trị, Vietnam

Coordinates: 17.073°N 107.111°E

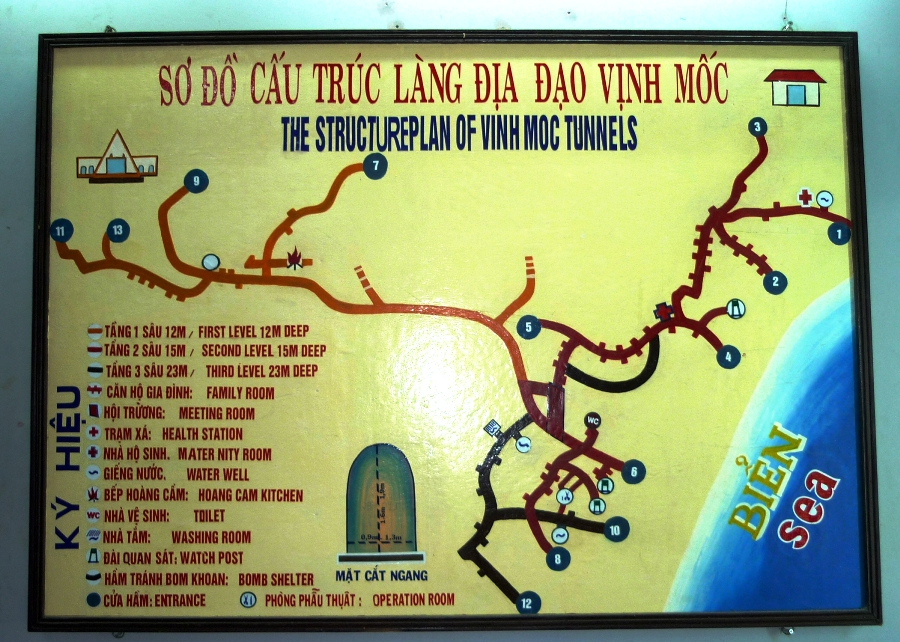
The structural plan of Vịnh Mốc Tunnels.

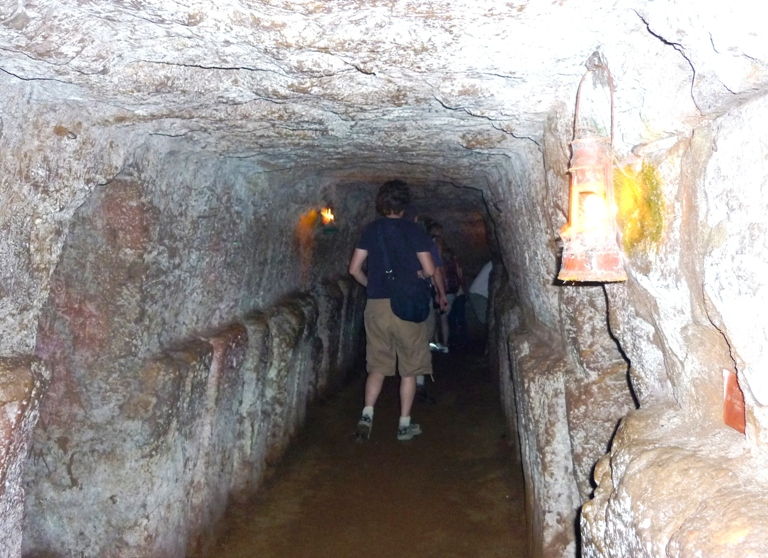
Visitors in Vịnh Mốc Tunnels.

Vịnh Mốc ([vɨn˨˩ʔ məwk͡p̚˦˧˥] vin-mouk) is a tunnel complex in Quảng Trị, Vietnam. During the Vietnam War it was strategically located on the border of North Vietnam and South Vietnam. The tunnels were built to shelter people from the intense bombing of Son Trung and Son Ha communes in Vinh Linh county of Quảng Trị Province in the Vietnamese Demilitarized Zone (DMZ).

The American forces believed the villagers of Vinh Moc were supplying food and armaments to the North Vietnamese garrison on the island of Con Co which was in turn hindering the American bombers on their way to bomb Hanoi. The idea was to force the villagers of Vinh Moc to leave the area but as is typical in Vietnam there was nowhere else to go. The villagers initially dug the tunnels to move their village 10 metres underground but the American forces designed bombs that burrowed down 10 metres.

Eventually, against these odds, the villagers moved the village to a depth of 30 metres. It was constructed in several stages beginning in 1966 and used until early 1972. The complex grew to include wells, kitchens, rooms for each family and spaces for healthcare. Around sixty families lived in the tunnels; as many as 17 children were born inside the tunnels.

The tunnels were a success and no villagers lost their lives. The only direct hit was from a bomb that failed to explode; the resulting hole was utilized as a ventilation shaft.

Three levels of tunnels were eventually built.

== Geography ==
The tunnels lie north of the Bến Hải River.

Much of the sub-strata of Vietnam is limestone which is soft to dig through yet structurally sound. The limestone allows easy hand digging of the tunnels and no structural supports are necessary.

== History ==
When the War took place in Vinh Moc from 1965 to 1973, the United States Army released over 9,000 tons of bombs in the area, with a ratio of 7 tons of bombs on average per person. The locals began to dig tunnels in 1965 and finished in 1967 with simple tools in 18,000 labor days. The total length of the tunnels is nearly 2,000 m long with six entrances to the tops of hills and seven entrances to the South China Sea.

== Tourism ==
Today, the tunnels are a tourist attraction and can be visited on organised tours. Beside individual tours to the tunnels, they are regularly part of day trips, starting from Huế to explore the DMZ. In comparison to the Củ Chi tunnels further south, walking through the Vinh Moc tunnels is a lot more comfortable, because they are situated in a less humid climate zone, and the height of the tunnels allows visitors to stand upright.

== Gallery ==
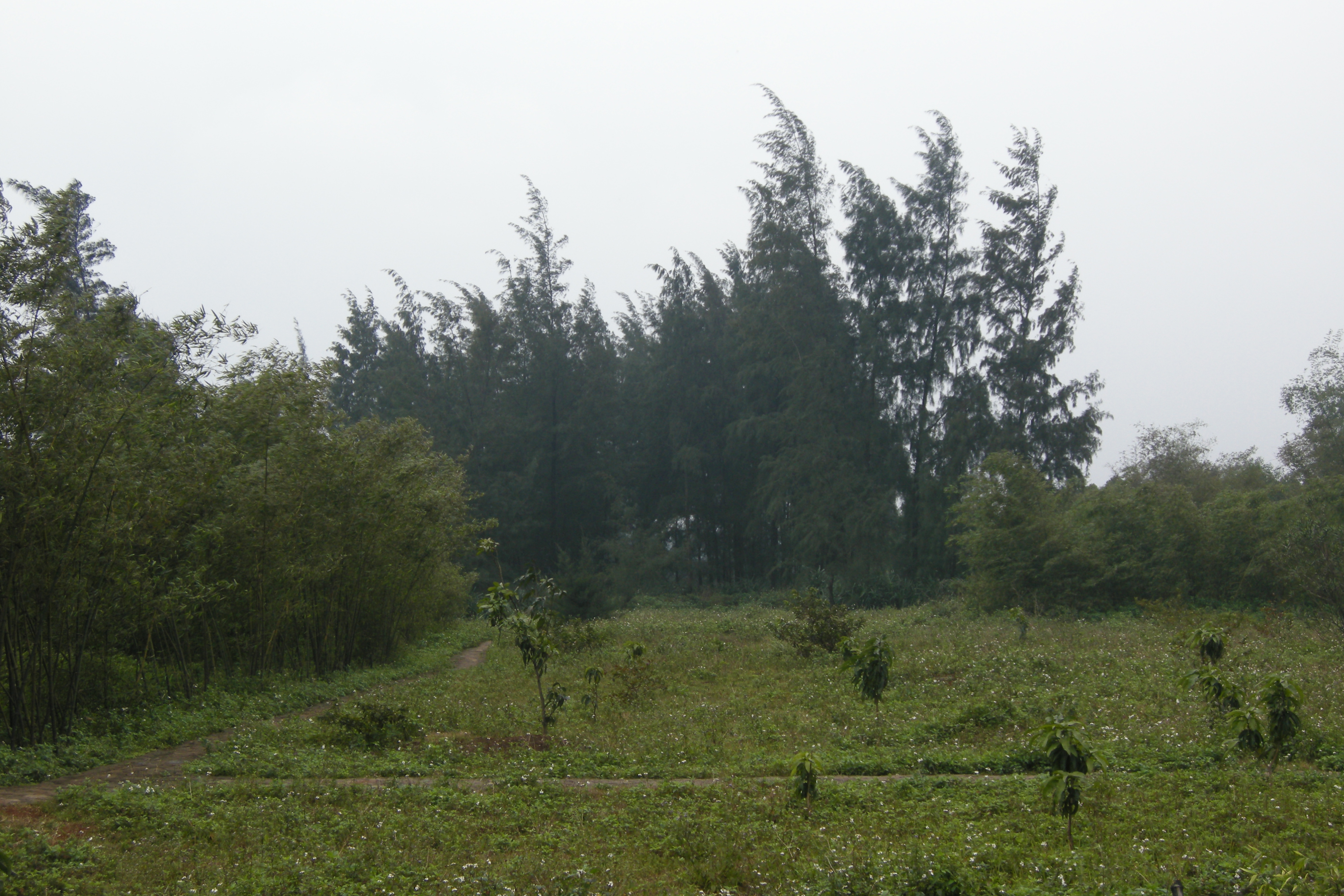
Entry points on the hills

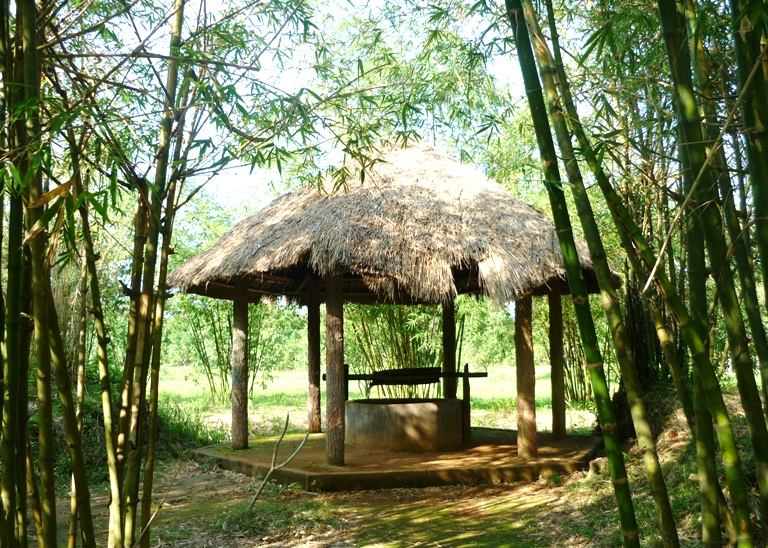
The water-well serving the Vinh Moc Tunnels.

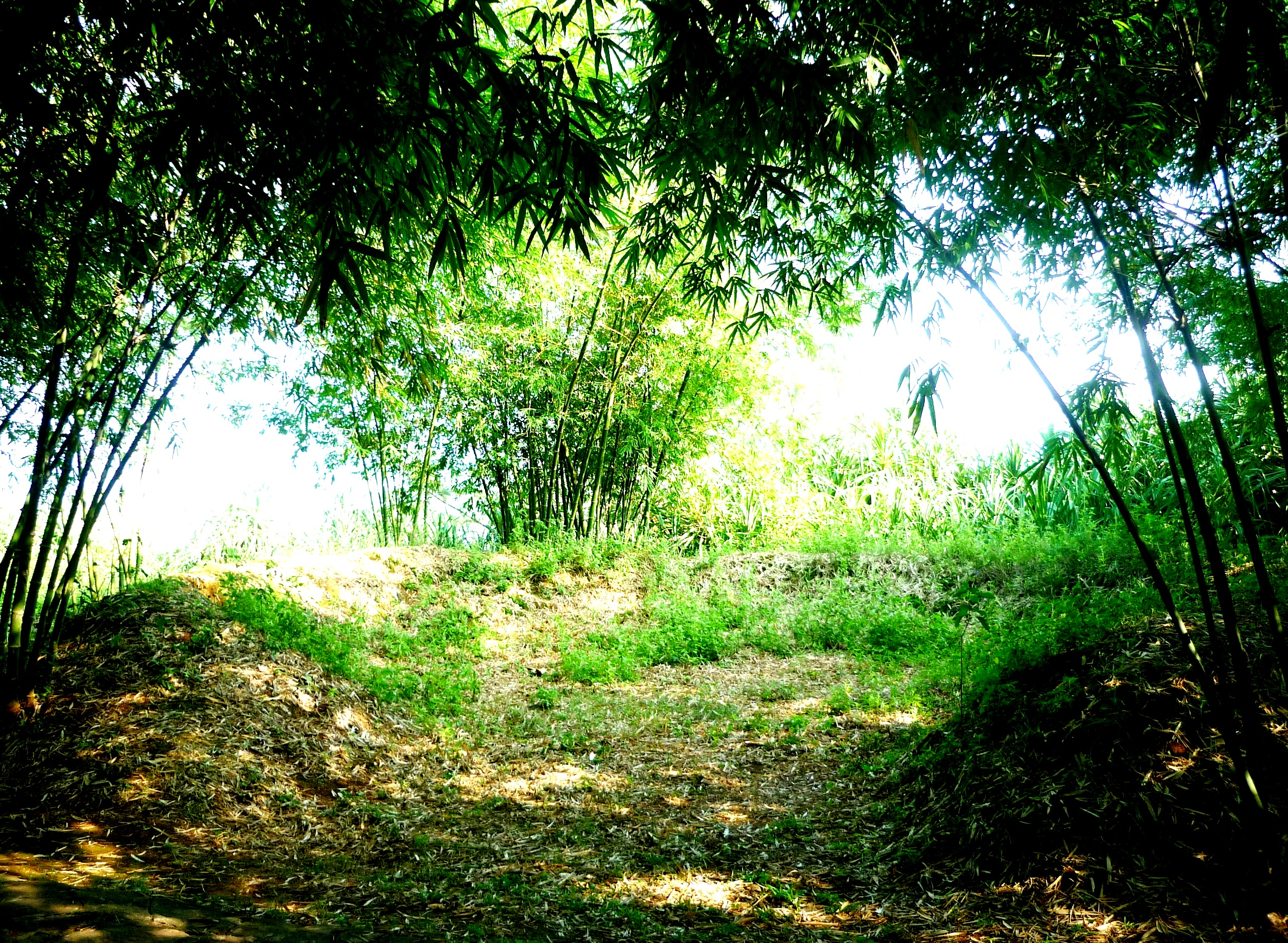
A bomb crater left behind in the former Vinh Moc Tunnels Village.

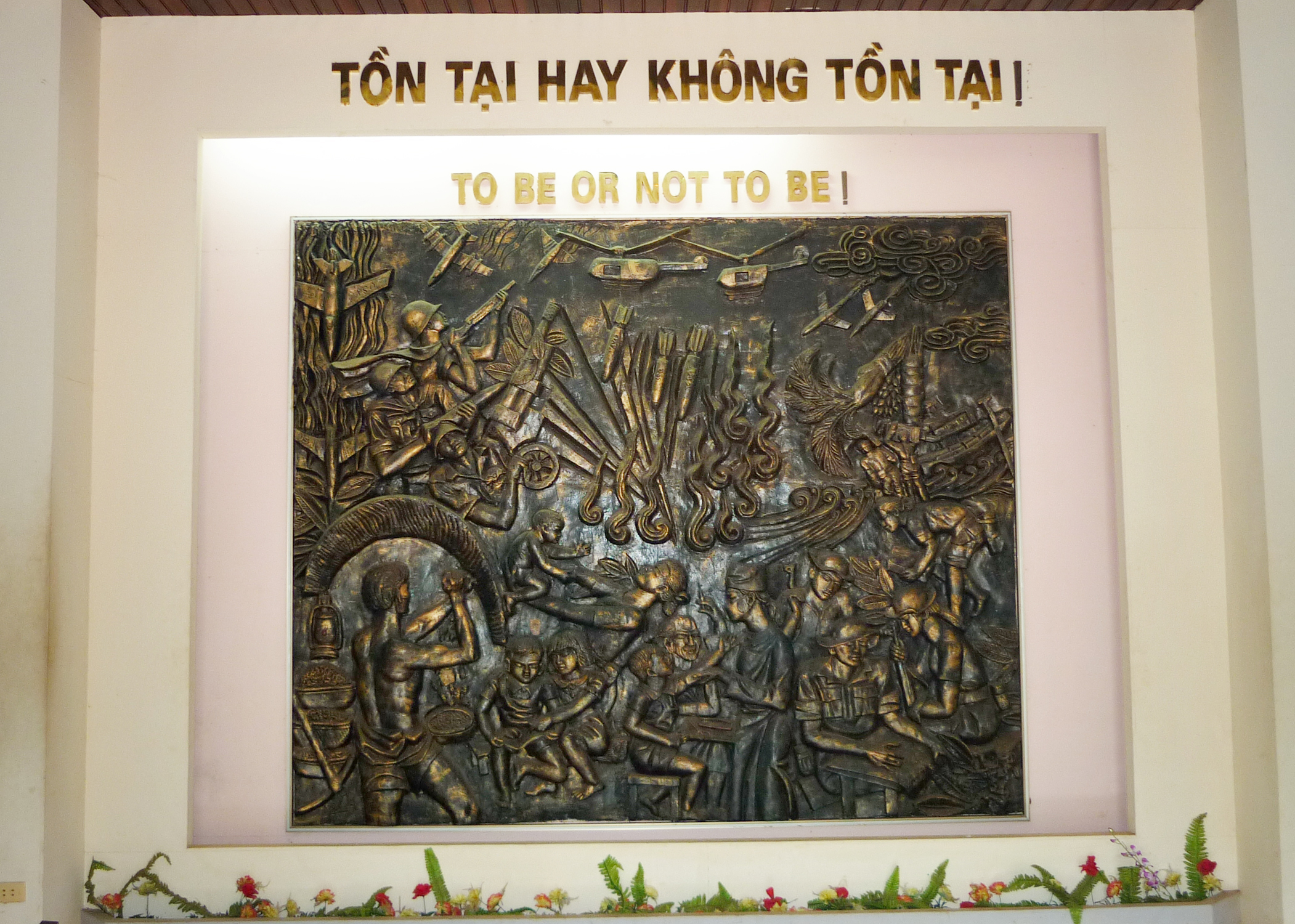
"TO BE OR NOT TO BE !" (in Vietnamese).

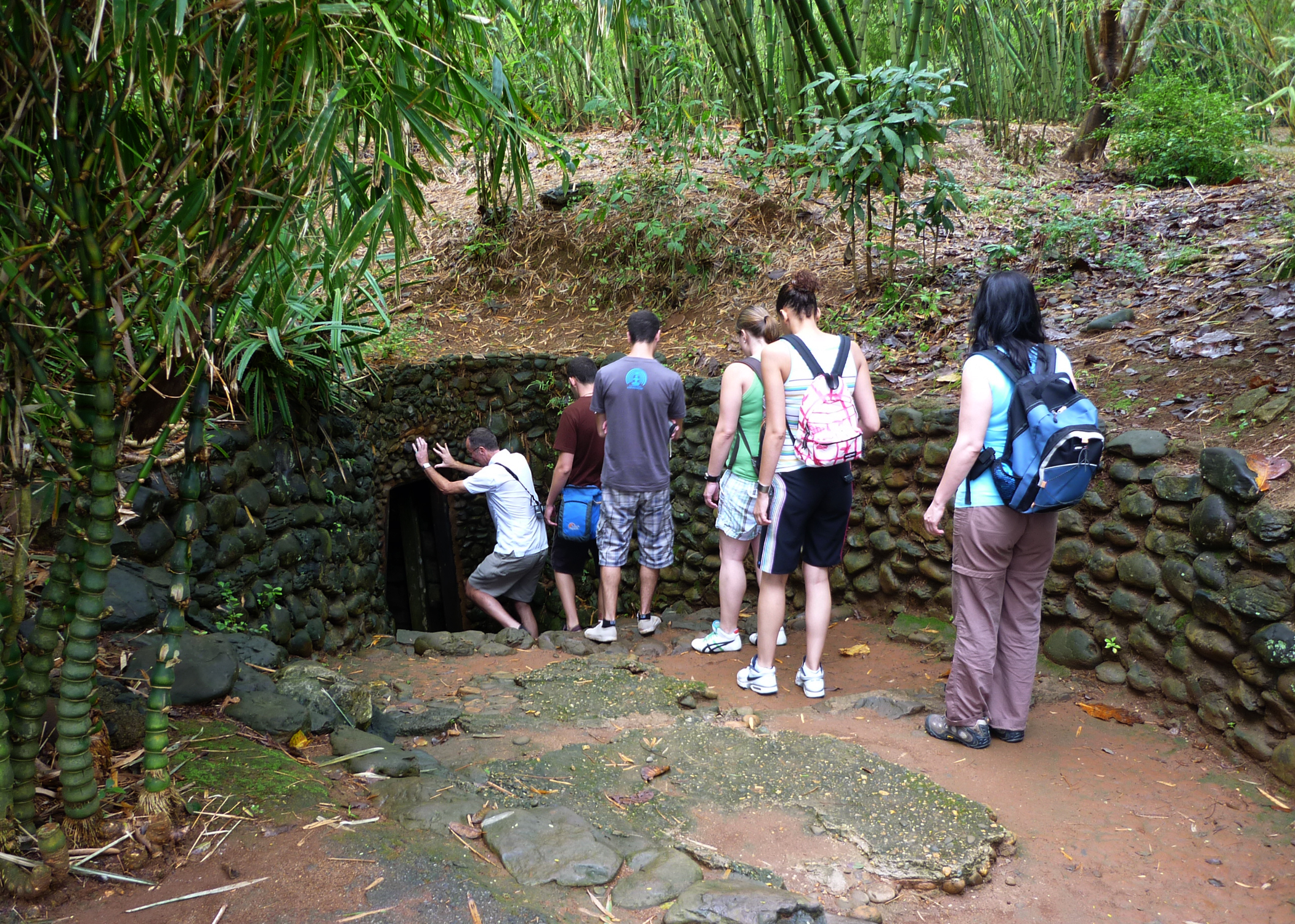
One of the entrances into the Vinh Moc Tunnels.

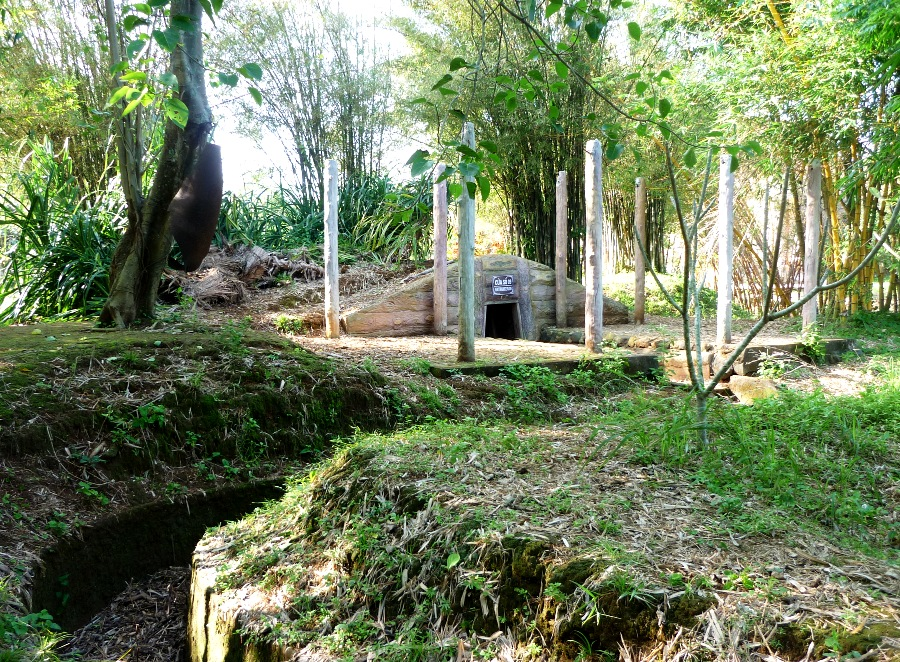
A large bomb fragment tied to a tree (at left) as a makeshift gong to alert everybody when necessary.

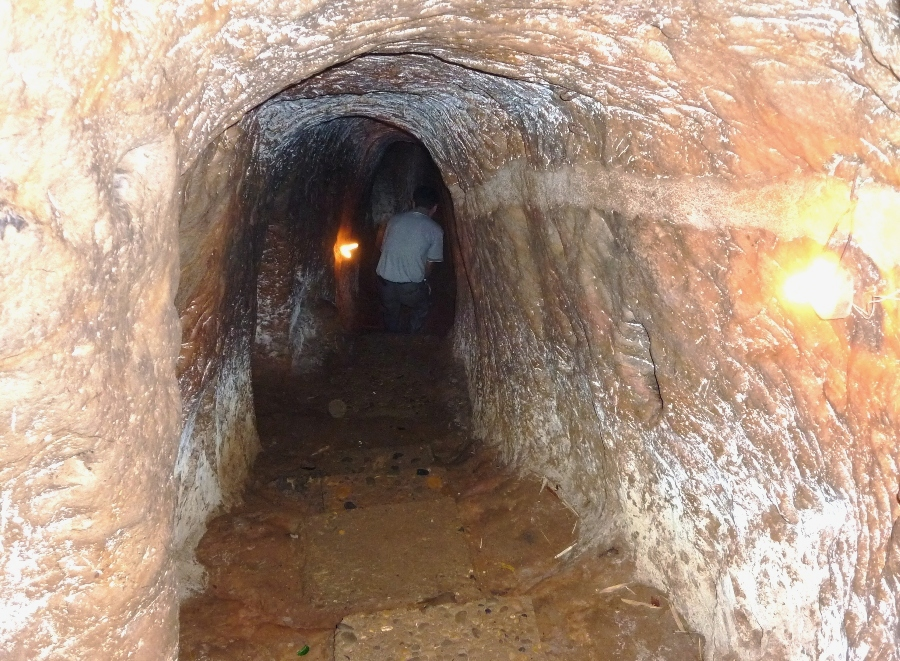
Descending down to the next level.

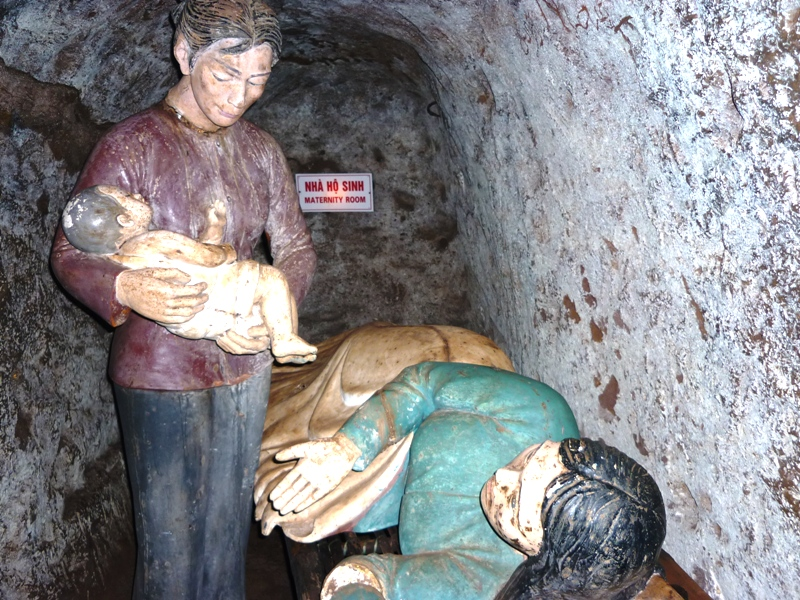
The maternity-room in Vinh Moc Tunnels.

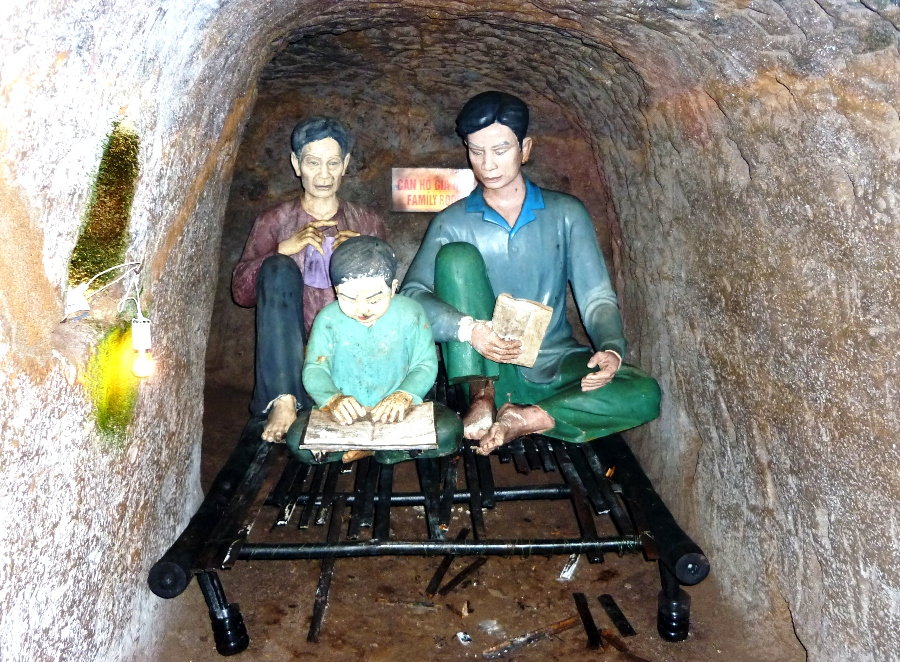
A family-room in Vinh Moc Tunnels.

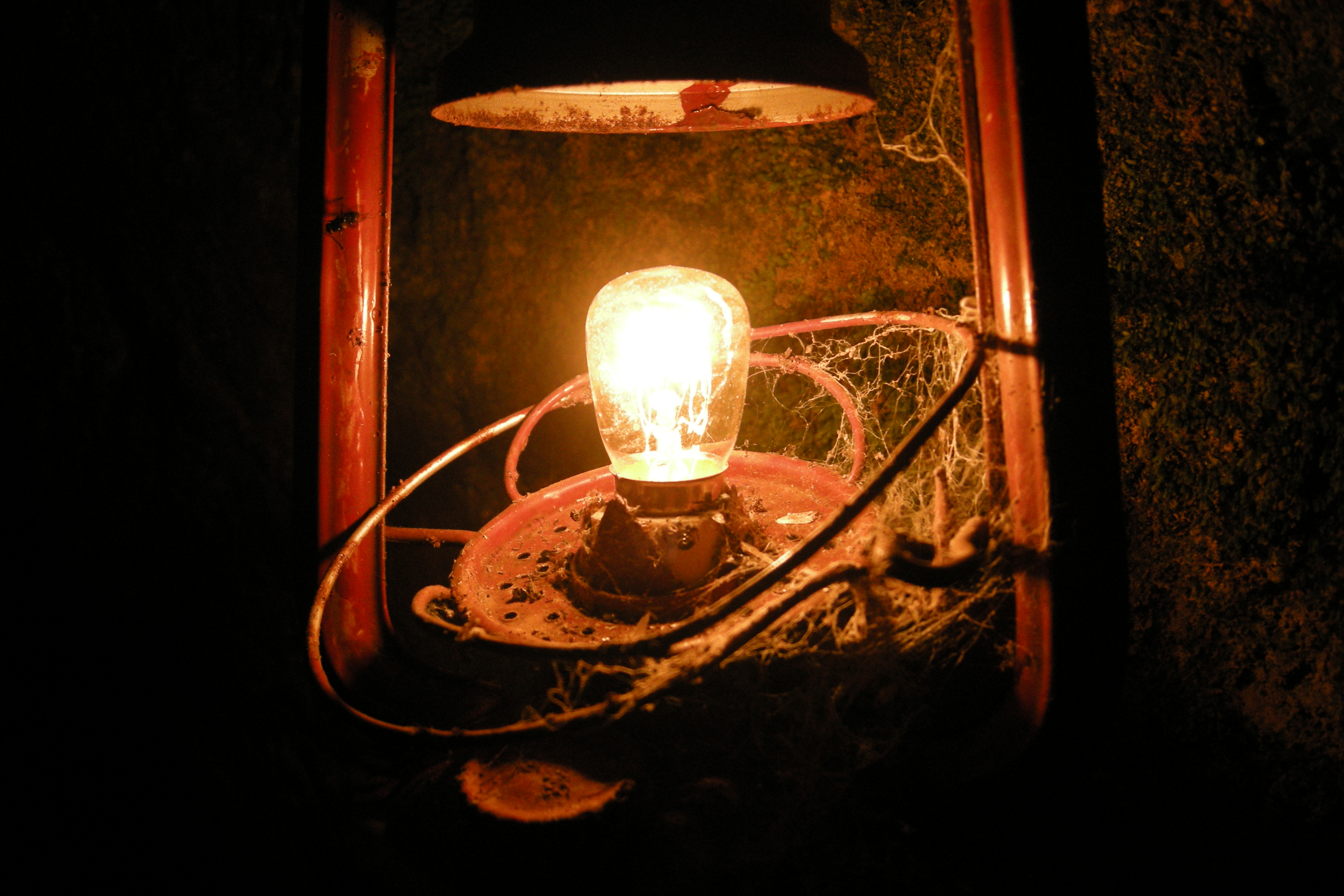
Converted oil lamps used in the tunnels.

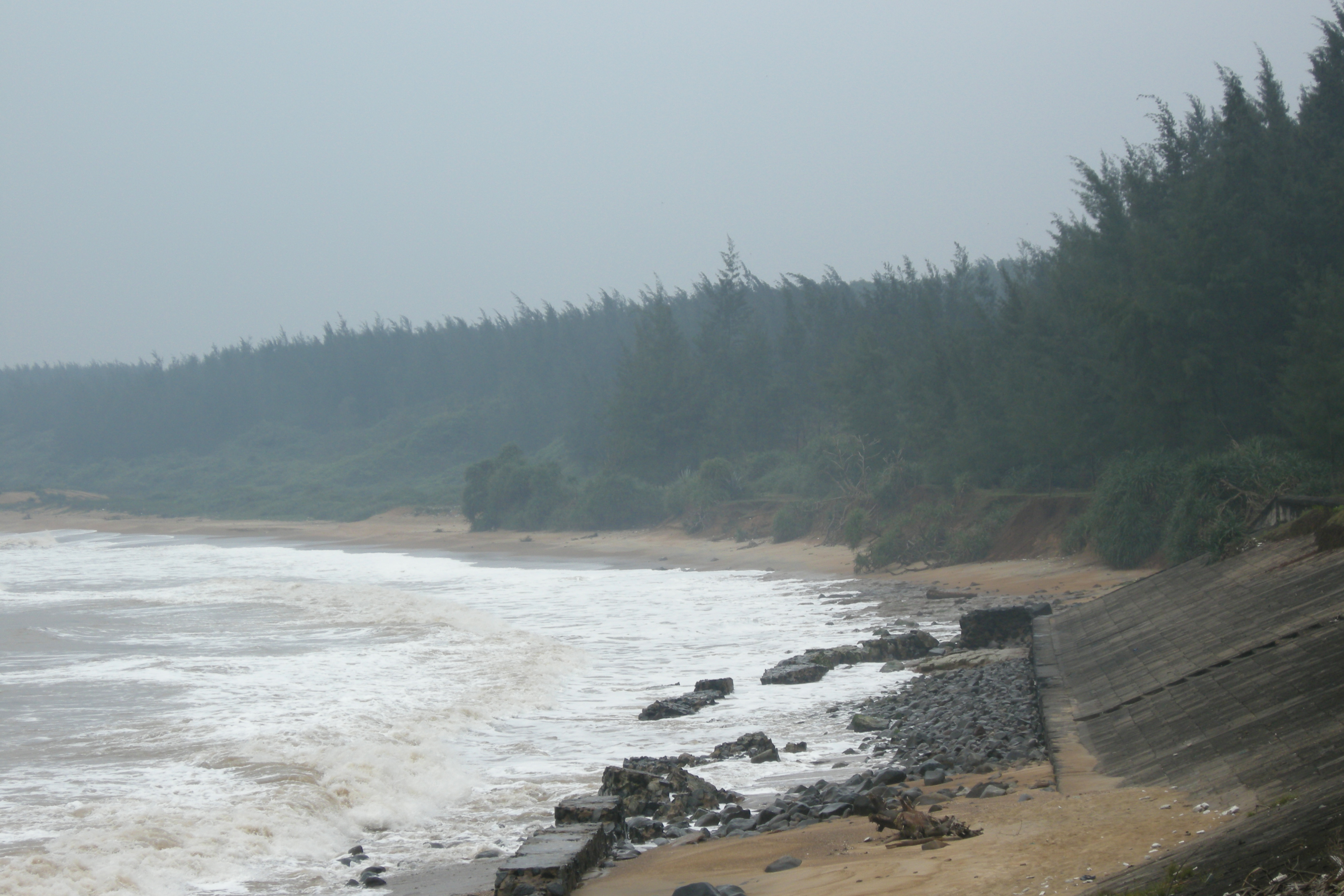
Beach of South China Sea at one of the exits.

== See also ==
- Cu Chi tunnels
- Tunnel rat
- Vietnamese Demilitarized Zone
- The Rockpile
- Khe Sanh Combat Base
- Huế
- Mai Xa
