= Đại Nam nhất thống chí =

19th-century Vietnamese geography texts

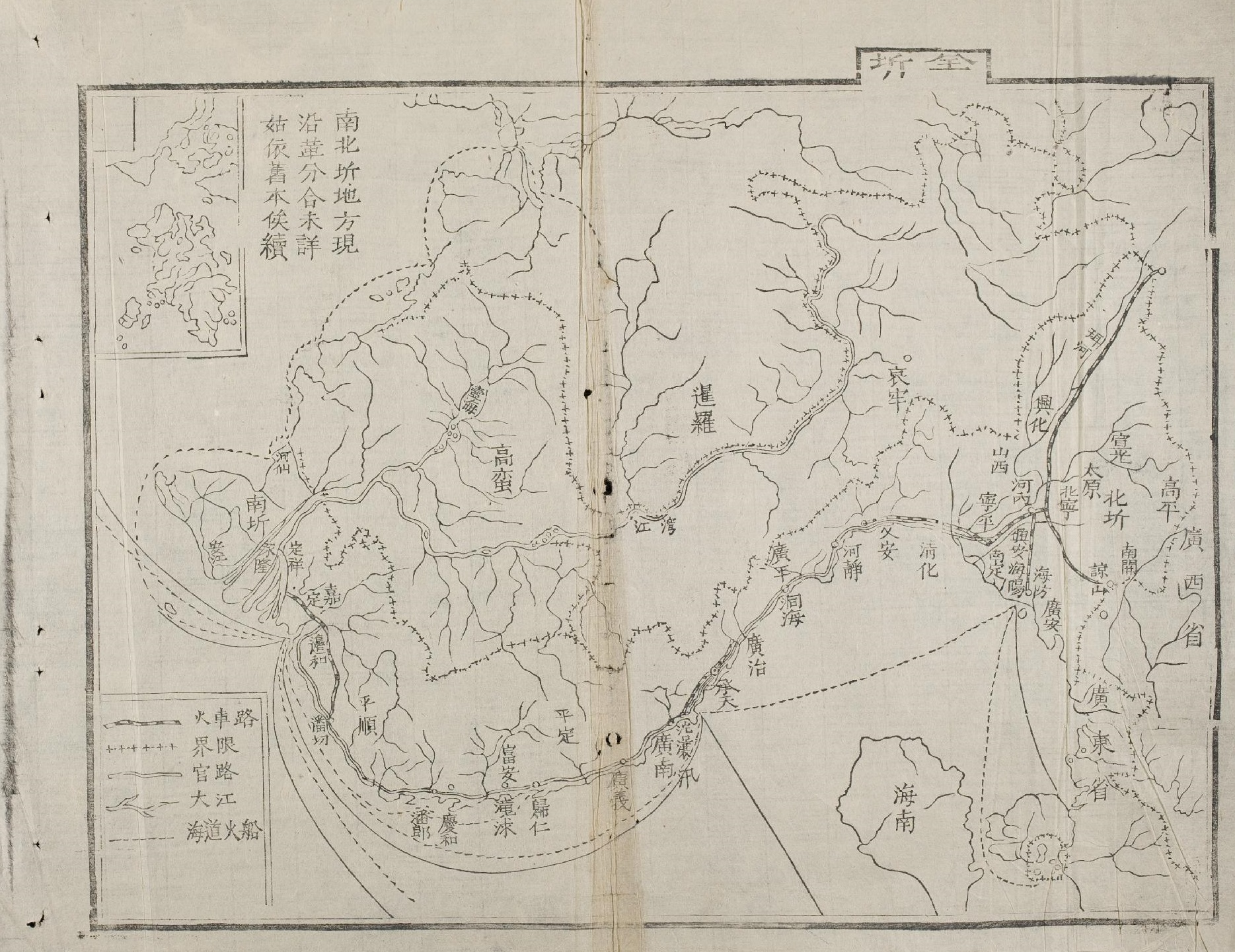
Map from the Đại Nam nhất thống chí

The Đại Nam nhất thống chí (chữ Hán: 大南一統志, 1882) is the official geographical record of Vietnam's Nguyễn dynasty written in chữ Hán compiled in the late nineteenth century. It also contains historical records of military campaigns.
