= Cửa Việt =

Commune in Quảng Trị Province, Vietnam

Cửa Việt is a commune of Quảng Trị Province, Vietnam. The commune is divided into three villages: Mai Xá, Mai Thi, Lâm Xuân.

On June 16, 2025, the Standing Committee of the National Assembly issued Resolution No. 1680/NQ-UBTVQH15 on the reorganization of commune-level administrative units in Quảng Trị Province in 2025. Accordingly, Cửa Việt Township, Gio Mai Commune, and Gio Hải Commune were merged to form a new commune named Cửa Việt Commune.
