= Battle of Quang Tri =

Battle of Quang Tri can refer to

- Battle of Quang Tri (1968), Tet Offensive
- First Battle of Quang Tri, 1972 Easter Offensive
- Second Battle of Quang Tri, 1972 Easter Offensive
