= Hoàng Hiệp =

Vietnamese songwriter

Hoàng Hiệp (1 October 1931, in Chợ Mới – 9 January 2013, in Saigon) was a Vietnamese songwriter. He was a recipient of the Hồ Chí Minh Prize in 2000.
