= Triệu Phong district =

Triệu Phong district Huyện Triệu Phong
- District
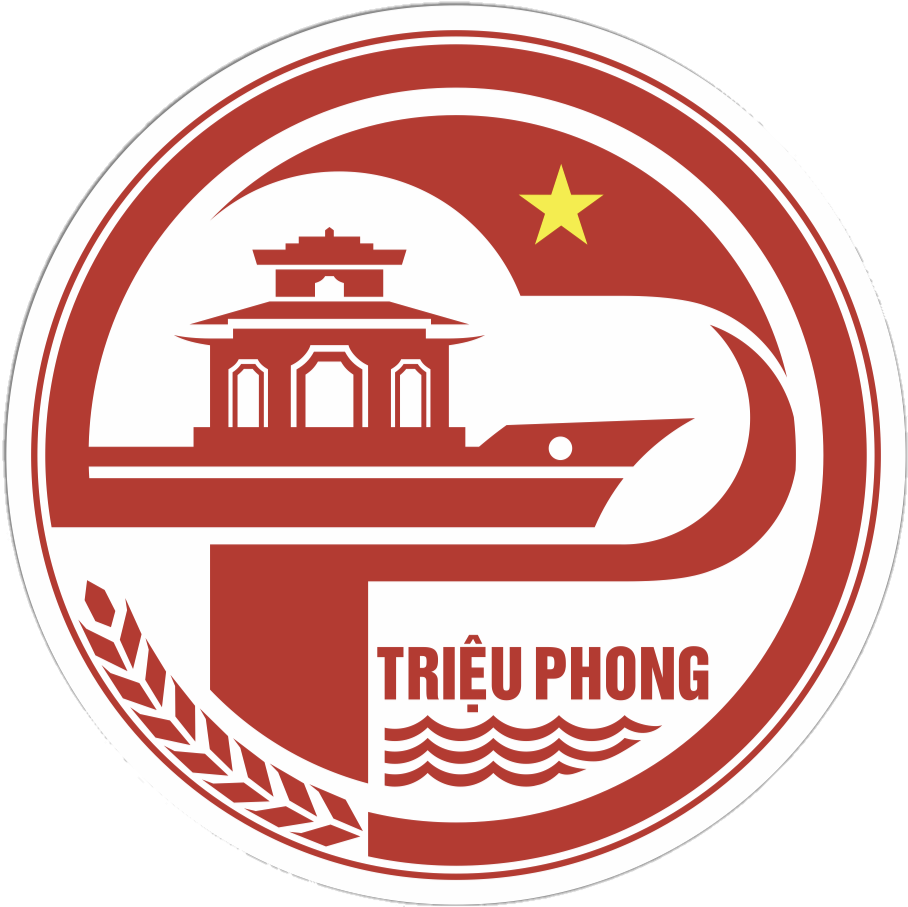
- Seal
- Interactive map of Triệu Phong district
- Location of Bến Tre
- Coordinates: 16°30′0″N 107°38′24″E
- Country: Vietnam
- Region: North Central Coast
- Province: Quảng Trị

Area
  - District: 137.04 sq mi (354.92 km^{2})

Population (2019)
  - District: 88,852
  - Density: 790/sq mi (306/km^{2})
  - Urban: 4,320
  - Rural: 84,532
- Time zone: UTC+07:00 (ICT)
- Area code: District
- Website: trieuphong.quangtri.gov.vn

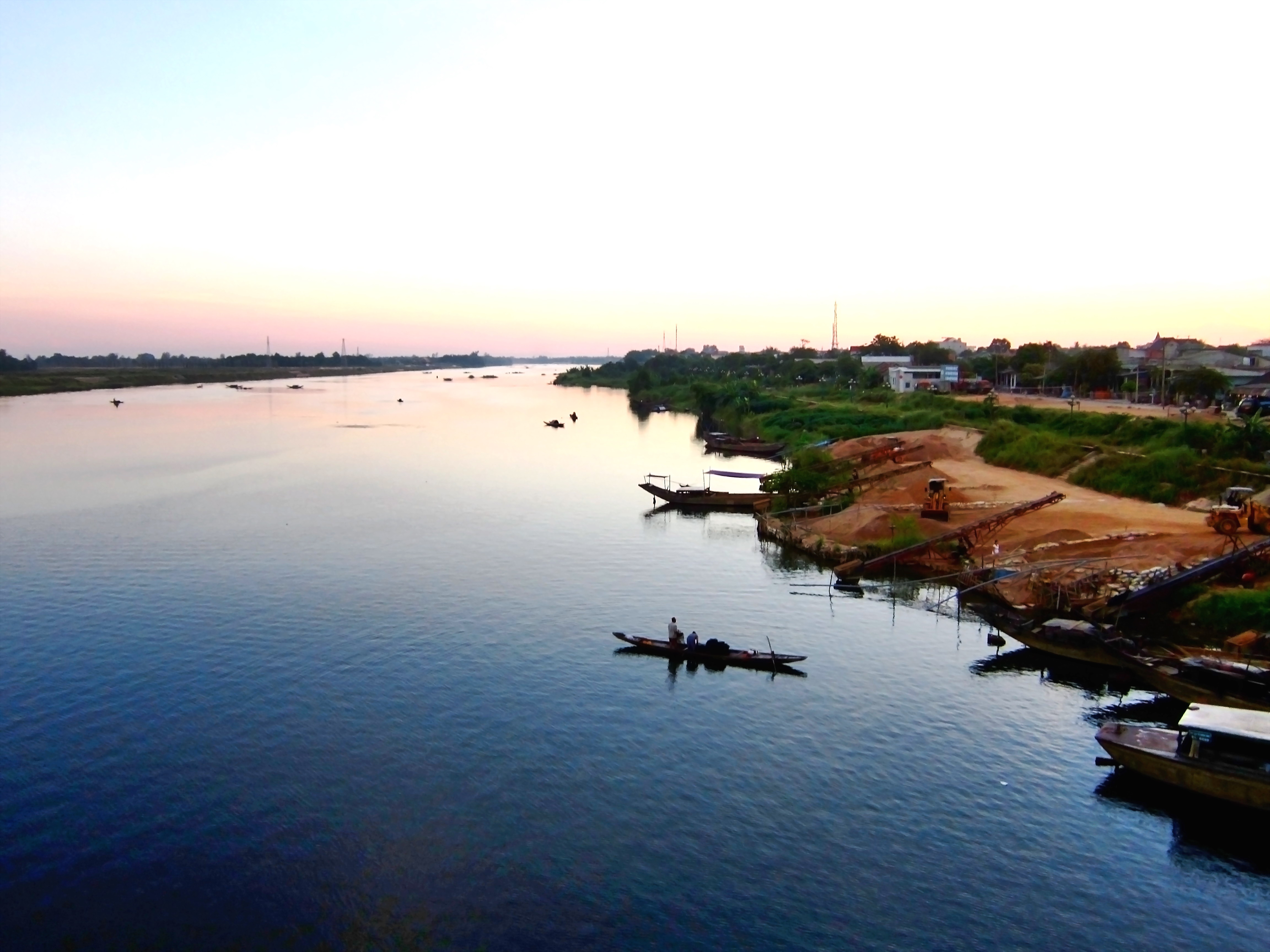
Shore of the town

Triệu Phong is a former district of Quảng Trị Province, Vietnam. The district is located in the southeastern part of the province and stretches like a silk strip from the border between two districts of Cam Lộ and Đakrông to the South China Sea. The length on the mainland from West to East is more than 30 km, the width in the delta ranges from 10 to 13 km.

== Geography ==
=== Geographical location ===
Triệu Phong district is located in the southeast of the province. It borders:

Gio Linh District to the north with the natural boundary of Thạch Hãn River

Quảng Trị Town to the south

Cam Lộ District to the west

Đông Hà City to the northwest

Đa Krông District to the southwest

Hải Lăng District to the southeast

East Sea to the east

Triệu Phong district is located in the southeastern part of the province which stretches like a sash from the border with two districts of Cam Lộ and Đakrông to the East Sea; with the length on the mainland from west to east more than 30 km, the width in the delta from 10 to 13 km. The natural area of the district is 354.92 km^{2}, the population of the district as of April 2009 is 108,657 people.

Ái Tử Township is the economic, socio-cultural center of the district, which is 7 km south of Đông Hà City and 6 km north of Quảng Trị Town. Trieu Phong is a district consisting mainly of a coastal plain with a small number of low hills in the communes of Triệu Thượng and Triệu Ái in the west, the eastern topography of the district is sand dunes and white sand dunes. The last section of Thạch Hãn River flows to Cửa Việt estuary located in the district.

=== Natural condition ===
==== Topographic ====
Triệu Phong District topography is inclined from West to East, divided into 3 distinct areas: hilly, plain and coastal sandy area:

Hilly area accounts for 51.08% of the district's natural land area, including communes of Triệu Thượng, Triệu Ái and a part of Triệu Giang Commune, where grows industrial crops, timber trees combined with cash crops, food crops, and developing farm economy.

The width of the plain area ranges from 7 to 8 km with an area of 38.39% of the natural land area, including communes: Triệu Thành, Triệu Long, Triệu Đông, Triệu Hòa, Triệu Đại, Triệu Độ, Triệu Thuận, Triệu Phước, Triệu Trạch, Triệu Sơn, Triệu Trung, Triệu Tài, part of Triệu Giang Commune and Ái Tử Township.

The east area of the district is a long stretch of sand running along the coast from North to South, more than 15 km long, 4 to 4.5 km wide, with an area of 10.53% of the district's natural land including communes Triệu Lăng, Triệu Vân, Triệu An. This is part of the Spratly, with 18 km long coastline. The fishing ground has several species of high economic value such as squid, crab, shrimp, and fish species for export.

==== Climate ====
Triệu Phong district is located in the tropical monsoon climate, divided into two seasons: cold rainy season and hot dry season.

The average annual temperature is about 23 to 25 °C. However it has quite a large fluctuation range (the highest month 35–39 °C, the lowest month 12–13 °C) The average annual rainfall is 2,500– 2,700mm, higher than the national average and unevenly distributed, mainly from September to December, which is likely to cause droughts and floods.

The lowland soil is extremely fertile, making it convenient for farming and bringing new high-quality crops into production.

== Administrative divisions ==
Triệu Phong district has 18 commune-level sub-divisions, including Ái Tử (district capital) and 17 communes: Triệu Ái, Triệu An, Triệu Đại, Triệu Độ, Triệu Giang, Triệu Hòa, Triệu Lăng, Triệu Long, Triệu Phước, Triệu Sơn, Triệu Tài, Triệu Thành, Triệu Thuận, Triệu Thượng, Triệu Trạch, Triệu Trung, Triệu Vân.

== History ==
Triệu Phong officially has belonged to the map of Đại Việt Country since 1306, when two Châu Ô – Châu Rí were presented by King Champa (Vietnamese: Chế Mân) as the wedding presents to marry Princess Huyền Trân - daughter of King Trần Nhân Tông. From that year backwards, ancient history only stated that this land was part of the Việt Thường Group- one of the 15 groups of Văn Lang Country of Hung Kings. After 207 (BC), it was a part of Tỳ Cành Sub-district, Nhật Nam District in the period of domination by northern invaders. In the middle of the fourth century, when Champa King – Phạm Văn drove the Han dynasty out of Ngang Pass, it became a part of Châu Ô, belonging to the Champa Kingdom.

After taking over, the Trần immigrated from the North to initiate the process of forming villages and establishing administrative units. The process of immigration took place in 3 main waves:

- The first wave from 1307: During this migration, there was a small number of people and villages. According to the Chinese Minh Chi book, until the middle of the second decade of the 15th century (more than a century later), both Châu Thuận and Châu Hóa had only 79 villages with 1,470 households and 5,662 people.
- The second wave in the early years of Lê Thánh Tông's period was significant. According to Thiên Nam dư hạ tập written in 1483, there were 53 villages in Võ Xương District. In 1553, the book Ô Châu cận lục of Dương Văn An recorded 59 villages. At that time, the number of villages in the delta was considerable, while that of the midlands was lesser, and only a few people lived along the sandbar, without villages.
- The third wave began when Nguyễn Hoàng came and defended Thuận Hóa Town (1558) onwards. This is the largest wave of migration. Two centuries later, in 1776, the book Phủ Biên tạp lục showed that Đăng Xương District consisted of 5 cantons, 107 communes, 29 wards, and 7 hamlets (Đăng Xương District at that time also included An Phúc Canton, Hải Lăng District and An Lạc Canton of Cam Lộ District, while the cantons of Hoa La and An Dã belonged to Hải Lăng District).

From that moment on, the migration and establishment of villages only took place within the province and district (the number of villages after the August Revolution in 1945 was only 23 more than that of 1776, of which the Midlands and Mountains witnessed the greatest increase (An Đôn Canton).

Parallel to the process of migration and establishment of villages, the process of forming administrative units occurred.

In 1307, the Trần changed the name Châu Ô to Châu Thuận, and set up the headquarters in the Vệ Nghĩa area (Triệu Long Commune nowadays). Administratively, the Trần divided Châu Thuận into four districts. Back then, Triệu Phong was Hoa Lãng District (i.e. beautiful and open).

In 1469, King Lê Thánh Tông redefined the country map, renamed Hoa Lãng to Võ Xương, belonged to Triệu Phong Prefecture (Triệu Phong Prefecture at that time included 6 districts from Cửa Việt to Điện Bàn (Quảng Nam – Đà Nẵng).

In 1604, Nguyễn Hoàng changed it to Đăng Xương District. However, the land of Đăng Xương District at that time was different from now.

In 1801, Quảng Tri Palace was placed including Triệu Phong Prefecture, the territory of 3 districts of Đăng Xương, Hải Lăng, Minh Linh.

In 1830, the prefect was appointed who also governed Minh Lương District, two districts of Đăng Xương, Hải Lăng.

In 1836, the prefect concurrently governed 3 districts of Đăng Xương, Minh Linh and Địa Linh. During the Duy Tân Dynasty, the prefecture was just a large district without government. That situation lasted until the dynasties of Minh Mạng, Tự Đức and Khải Định and then was gradually adjusted to become the present land. The geographic adjustment process is as follows:

- In 1836, An Lạc Canton was moved to Địa Linh District (Gio Linh). An Nhơn Canton and 3 villages of Phương Long, Phú Hải, Thuận Đầu (under An Lưu Canton) were moved to Hải Lăng District. An Dã Canton and 2 villages of Tam Hữu, Anh Hoa (Anh Kiệt belonged to An Thái Canton and most of Hoa La Canton except villages of Thạch Hãn, Tý Lễ (Quy Thiện, Long Hưng, Tích Tường, Như Lệ were merged into Đăng Xương District) ).
- In 1842, 4 villages of Phường Thiết, Tràng Thượng, Hoà Đức, Nội Đức of An Đôn Canton were merged into Thành Hoá District (Cam Lộ nowadays).
- In 1844, due to the same name as the King's, Đăng Xương was changed to Thuận Xương.
- In 1867, the villages of Đông Lai, Thượng Nghĩa, Đông Hà, Tây Trì under An Đôn Canton were moved to Thành Hóa District, at the same time the villages of Hà Xá, Trung Chỉ, Điếu Ngao, Lộc Yên were moved from Thành Hóa to Đăng Xương District.
- Between 1918 and 1919, during the period of Khải Định, through administrative reform, a canton was only a large district without district management and Thuận Xương became the prefect named Trieu Phong Prefect, including 5 cantons (An Đôn, Bích La, An Dã, An Cư and An Lưu).
- In 1920, the villages of Duy Phiên, Thanh Xuân, Xuân Thành were moved from Gio Linh District to Trieu Phong.

After the August Revolution in 1945, the revolutionary government dissolved the cantons to form a commune consisting of several villages.

In October 1946, the whole district had 14 communes, the capital units were changed to districts.

In 1950, implementing the provincial policy from 14 communes merged into 10 large communes.

In 1956, the Republic of Vietnam divided Triệu Phong into 18 communes in 3 separate administrative districts, namely Triệu Phong, Đông Hà and Ba Lòng.

=== From 1976 to present ===
In 1977, Triệu Phong District merged with Hải Lăng into Triệu Hải District.

On May 11, 1981, Quảng Trị Town was established.

On September 11, 1981, Triệu Lương and Triệu Lễ communes were relocated to Đông Hà Town for management (which are Đông Lương and Đông Lễ wards of Đông Hà City nowadays).

On September 17, 1981, according to which:

Ba Lòng Commune was divided into two communes named Ba Lòng and Triệu Nguyên

Triệu Vân Commune was divided into two communes named Triệu Vân and Triệu An.

Since 1989, Quang Tri Township was split to form Quang Tri Town.

In 1990, Triệu Hải district was divided into two districts Triệu Phong, Hải Lăng and Quảng Trị Town, Triệu Phong District including 21 communes: Ba Lòng, Hải Phúc, Triệu Ái, Triệu An, Triệu Đại, Triệu Độ, Triệu Đông, Triệu Giang, Triệu Hòa, Triệu Lăng, Triệu Long, Triệu Nguyên, Triệu Phước, Triệu Sơn, Triệu Tài, Triệu Thành, Triệu Thuận, Triệu Thượng, Triệu Trạch, Triệu Trung, Triệu Vân.

On August 1, 1994, Ái Tử Township was established from the land of Triệu Ái Commune.

By 1997, 3 communes of Ba Lòng, Triệu Nguyên and Hải Phúc were moved to Đa Krông District, Triệu Phong District had 18 communes and 1 town.

On January 1, 2020, Triệu Đông Commune was merged into Triệu Thành commune.

Triệu Phong district has 1 town and 17 communes nowadays.

== Traffic ==
- In terms of roads, there is National Route 1A running through
- National Route 49C has the starting point at Cửa Việt Bridge (Gio Linh District) and the ending at the border between Triệu Trung Commune and Hải Lăng district.
- Thống Nhất North-South Railway runs along National Route 1A
- In terms of waterways, there are Thạch Hãn River and Cửa Việt Port
- Triệu Phong is also the locality where the Quảng Trị - Đà Nẵng Expressway project is under construction.

Triệu Phong has National Route 1A and a railway running through.

In addition to the above important roads, Triệu Phong has 5 provincial roads, which are:

- Provincial road 6 from Ái Tử Township to Thượng Phước up to Cùa (Cam Lộ).
- Provincial road 578b is a road upgraded from a part of district road DH 40 and the road to Đại Lộc Bridge: The starting point is at Đại Lộc Bridge, the end point intersects NR49C at km8 + 500.
- Provincial road 579: 6 km long from Ái Tử Township to Triệu Ái Commune.

From the provincial roads, several arterial roads connecting the district have been invested in upgrading such as:

- Ba Bến – Triệu Lăng Road
- Triệu Tài – Ái Tử Township Road
- Đại – Độ - Thuận – Phước Road
- Chợ Cạn – Bồ Bản Road
- Cửa Việt – Mỹ Thủy Road.

In the district, there is a big river flowing through Thạch Hãn River, Vĩnh Định Canal and two other rivers which are Vĩnh Phước and Ái Tử.

== Celebrities ==
- Nguyễn Văn Tường: The main sub-mandarin Nguyễn Dynasty, one of the key figures of the Cần Vương movement
- Lê Duẩn: General Secretary of the Communist Party of Vietnam
- Đoàn Khuê: General of the Vietnam People's Army, Minister of National Defense
- Trần Hữu Dực: Deputy Prime Minister
- Duy Khánh: Singer, composer
- Hoàng Thi Thơ: Composer
- Như Quỳnh: Singer
- Hoàng Phủ Ngọc Tường: Writer
- Hoàng Kiều: Entrepreneur
- Hồ Ngọc Đại: Leading PhD in educational psychology.
