= Vĩnh Linh =

Vĩnh Linh Xã Vĩnh Linh
- Commune
- Vĩnh Linh commune
- Location within Vietnam
- Coordinates: 17°04′14″N 107°00′28″E
- Country: Vietnam
- Region: North Central Coast
- Province: Quảng Trị
- Time zone: UTC+7 (UTC + 7)

Vĩnh Linh (pronounced [how˦˩ saː˨˩˦] hoe-saw) is a commune (xã) of Quảng Trị province, Vietnam. It is one of the 78 new wards, communes and special zones of the province following the reorganization in 2025.

On June 16, 2025, the Standing Committee of the National Assembly issued Resolution No. 1680/NQ-UBTVQH15 on the reorganization of commune-level administrative units in Quảng Trị Province in 2025. Accordingly, Hồ Xá Township, Vĩnh Long Commune, and Vĩnh Chấp Commune were merged to form a new commune named Vĩnh Linh Commune.

== History ==
The 1600s Vietnamese ruler Nguyen Phuoc Tan personally supervised the dredging of Hồ Xá port so as to enable its use for the transport of rice.

The South Vietnamese government reported in 1962 that the People's Army of Vietnam built an airport in Hồ Xá with assistance from Soviet Union and China. French American John Gerassi wrote that during the United States presidency of Lyndon B. Johnson, United States aircraft bombed markets in the township. Hospitals were bombed by United States aircraft in the 1960s. A military base in Hồ Xá was a priority bombing in 1965 that the United States military based on "prisoner interrogations, captured documents, and agent intelligence." The North Vietnamese Army propaganda radio station Radio Hanoi broadcast in 1965 that hospitals, school, and streets were targeted while the Indian journalist Harsh Deo Malaviya wrote in Socialist Congressman about the United States bombing Hồ Xá and nearby Nam Ho in 1966. The United States Central Intelligence Agency published a North Vietnam radio broadcast which mentioned the 1965 bombings of the township. Hồ Xá was once known as the "B-52 bomb pocket" due to multiple Boeing B-52 Stratofortress constantly bombing the township. A 1994 article in The World mentions a villager remarking on how it was a miracle for the township to have running water.

A pink signpost that is across from a petrol station points toward the Vịnh Mốc tunnels in Quảng Trị, where people stayed to escape American bombings. A section is open for the public to tour and there is a museum by the entrance.
