= Bến Hải River =

Coordinates: 17°00′54″N 107°06′45″E

Ben Hai River
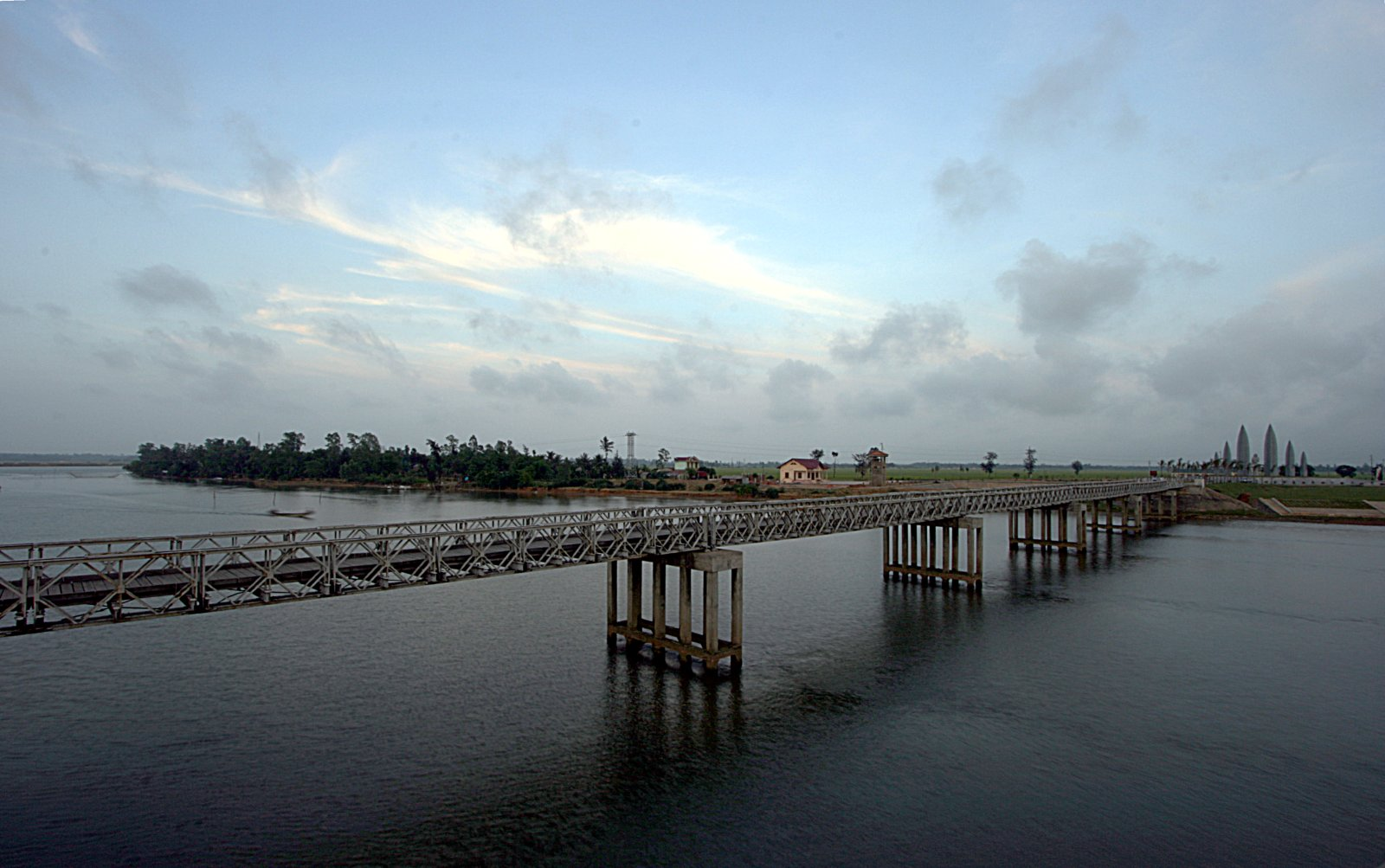
- Hien Luong Bridge across the Ben Hai River

Location
- Country: Vietnam

Physical characteristics
- Source
  - location: Annamite Mountains
- Mouth
  - location: South China Sea
  - elevation: 0 m (0 ft)
- Length: 100 km (62 mi)

The Bến Hải River (Vietnamese: Sông Bến Hải) is a river in central Vietnam which became an important landmark in the partition of the country into a northern and a southern zone along the 17th parallel by the Geneva Accords of 1954 then ended in 1975. The demilitarized zone (DMZ) separating the two parts extended about 5 kilometers (3.1 mi) from either side of the river.

== Geography ==
The Bến Hải River has a total length of about 100 kilometers; its source is located in the Annamite Mountains along the border with Laos and it flows into the South China Sea at Cua Tung (Tung River mouth). In the mountains, the river is named "Rao Thanh". It flows from west to east just south of the 17th parallel and close to the northern border of Quảng Trị Province, in which it is located. At its widest point, the river is about 200 meters wide.

== Recent history ==
At the time of the partition 1954, the principal north-south road (Highway 1) crossed the Bến Hải River over Hien Luong Bridge (also known as the "Peace Bridge"), a beam bridge built from steel by the French in 1950. After the partition, the northern portion of the bridge was painted red and the southern portion yellow. The bridge was damaged by American bombardment during the Vietnam War in 1967. U.S. jets destroyed the bridge on 5 April 1972 in order to delay invading North Vietnamese forces during the Easter Offensive. After the Paris Peace Accords, a modern bridge was built next to the old bridge.

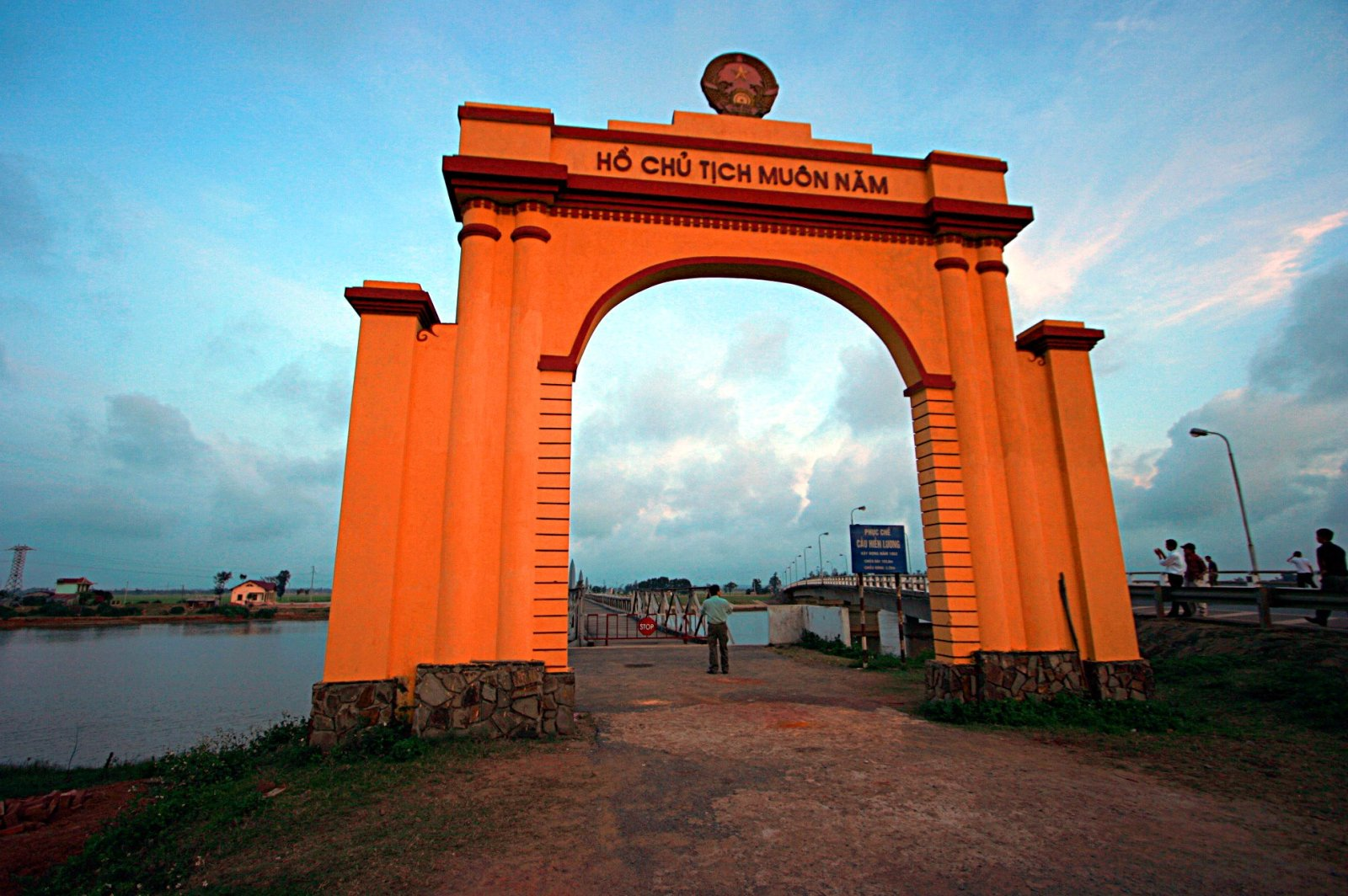
Memorial portal to Ho Chi Minh, at the Hien Luong Bridge

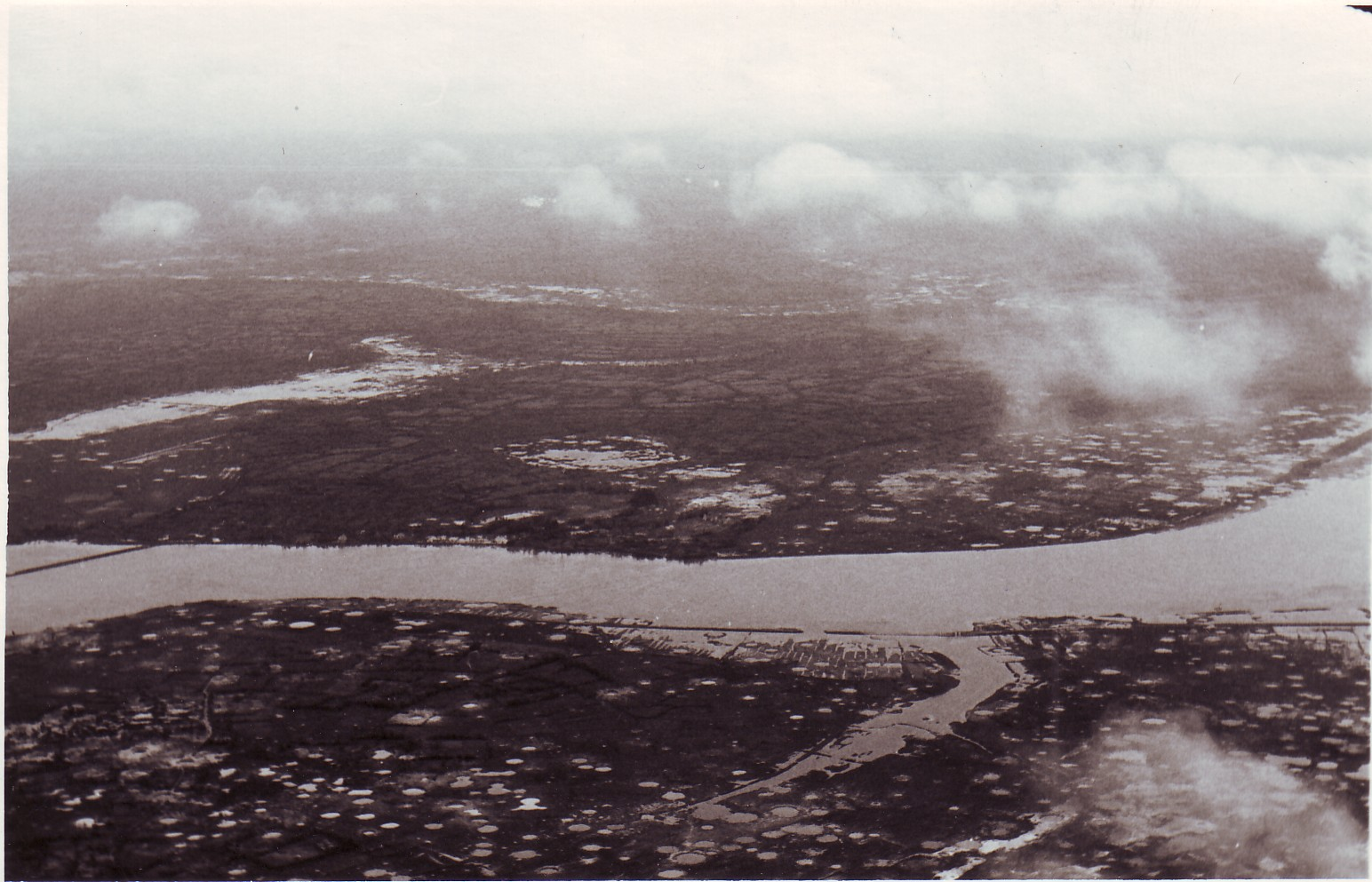
Looking across the Bến Hải River toward North Vietnam, March 1968.
