= Long Xuyên city =

Long Xuyên Thủ Đông Xuyên
- Provincial city (Class-1)
- Long Xuyên City; Thành phố Long Xuyên
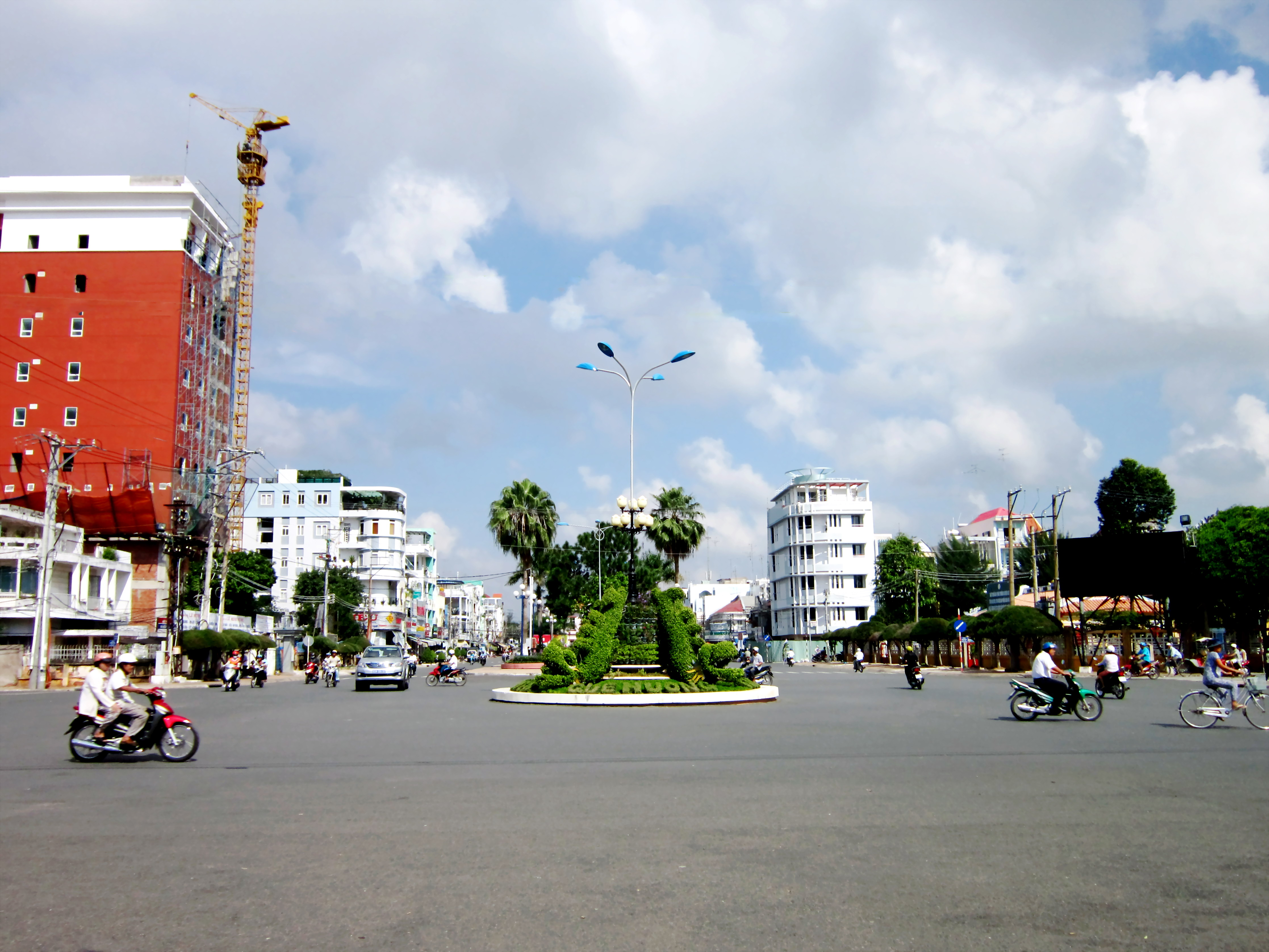

- Seal
- Interactive map of Long Xuyên
- Location in Vietnam
- Coordinates: 10°22′25″N 105°26′45″E
- Country: Vietnam
- Province: An Giang
- Established city: March 1, 1999

Government
  - Secretary: Đặng Thị Hoa Rây
  - Chairman of the People's Committee: Đặng Thị Hoa Rây

Area
  - Provincial city (Class-1): 115.36 km^{2} (44.54 sq mi)

Population (2022 census)
  - Provincial city (Class-1): 286,140
  - Density: 2,480.4/km^{2} (6,424.2/sq mi)
  - Urban: 239,588
  - Rural: 46,552

Metro GDP (PPP, constant 2015 values)
  - Year: 2023
  - Total: $3.1 billion
  - Per capita: $9,200
- Time zone: UTC+07:00 (Indochina Time)
- Climate: Aw
- Website: longxuyen.angiang.gov.vn

Long Xuyên (Vietnamese: [lāwŋm sʷīən]), formally named Thủ Đông Xuyên, was the former capital city of An Giang province, in the Mekong Delta region of south-western Vietnam.

== History ==
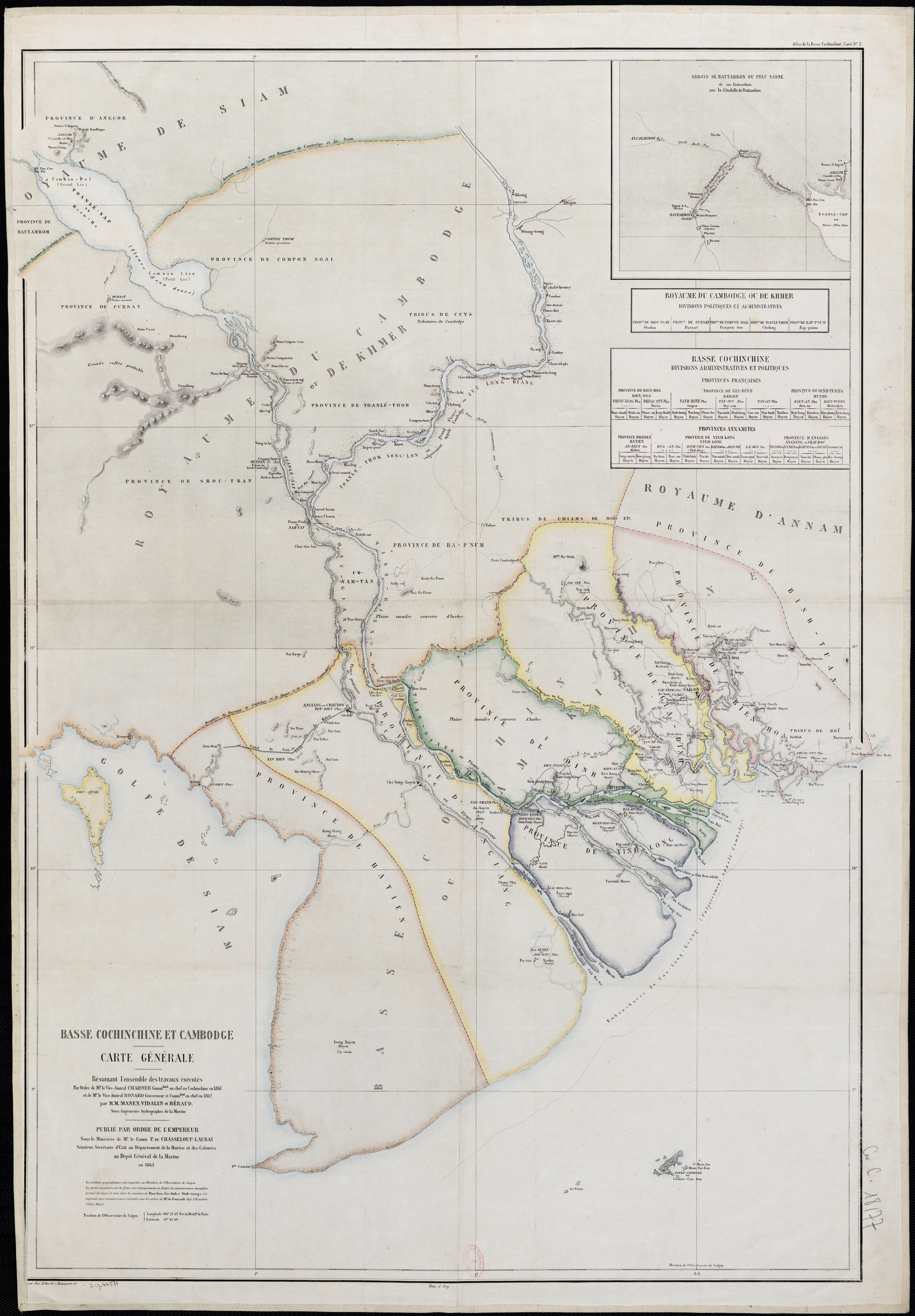
1863 map of Long Xuyen

In 1789, a group of explorers established a small outpost in the Tam Khe canal, naming it Dong Xuyen. Soon after, a marketplace was created and named Long Xuyên, but by the 1860s the area became better known for the Long Xuyen market than by the official outpost's name. From 1877, the reach of Long Xuyên grew as the city's administration became responsible for an increasing number of neighborhoods and wards. Long Xuyen would not be designated as a formal city until 1999.

== Geography ==
It is located approximately 1,950 km south of Hanoi, 189 km from Ho Chi Minh City, and 45 km from the Cambodian border. The population of Long Xuyên city is 272,365 (April 2019), with an area of approximately 114.96 km^{2}.

The city is subdivided to 13 commune-level subdivisions, including the wards of: Mỹ Bình, Mỹ Long, Mỹ Xuyên, Bình Khánh, Mỹ Phước, Đông Xuyên, Mỹ Quý, Mỹ Thạnh, Mỹ Thới, Bình Đức, Mỹ Hòa and the rural communes of Mỹ Hòa Hưng and Mỹ Khánh.

== Economy ==
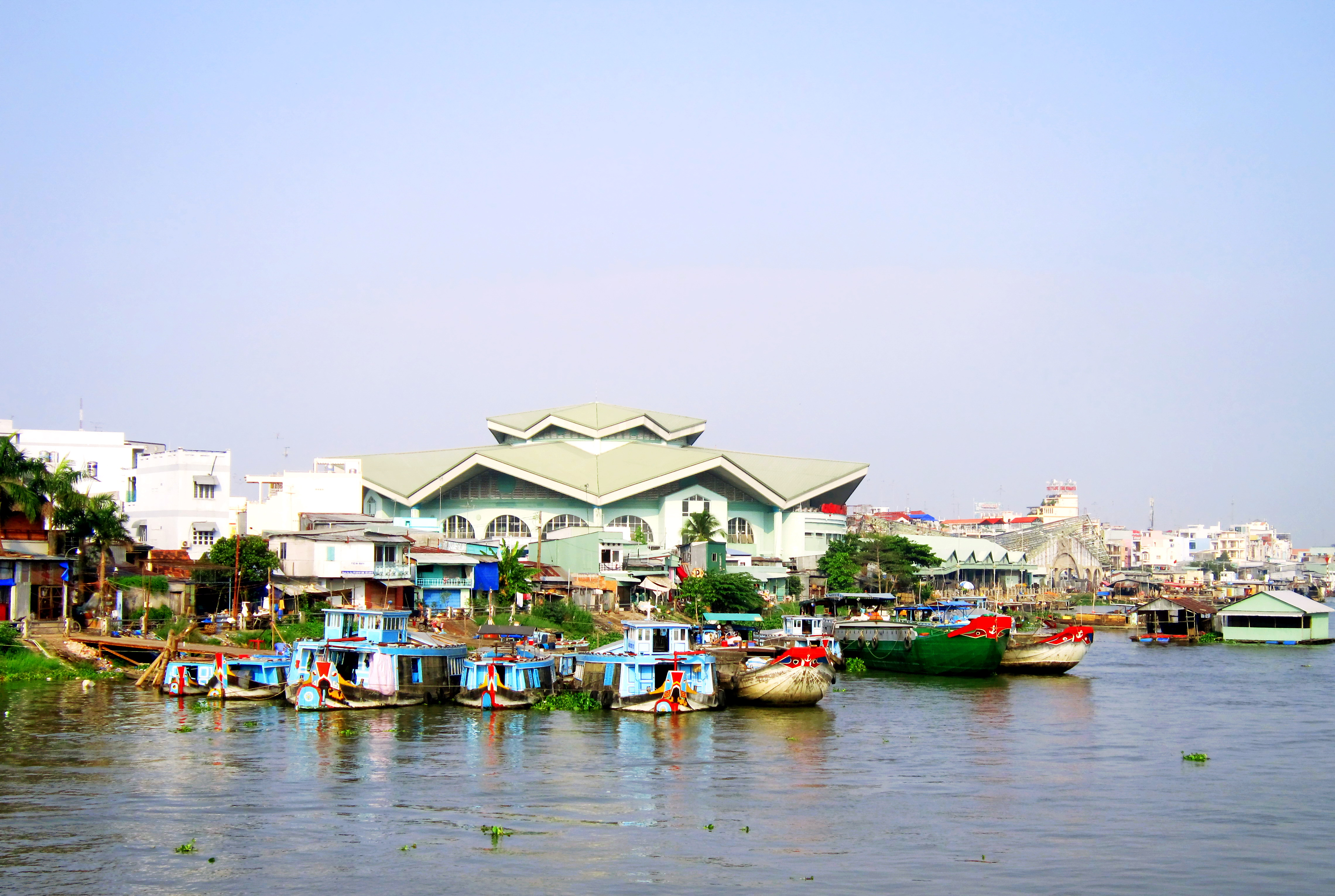
Long Xuyen Marketplace next to the Hau River

As a major urban hub within the rural Mekong River Delta region, Long Xuyen is adjacent to major agricultural operations. With a major docking station in the middle of the city and rivers cutting throughout its landscape, the city connects the residents of the provinces of An Giang, Dong Thap, and Kien Giang province to the region's land-based infrastructure.

With farms in towns surrounding the city connected by roads and canals, Long Xuyen (and its Quadrilateral Region) serves as a major conduit for producers of a number of commodities, with jasmine rice and basa fish being the two most well-known. The proliferation of irrigation canals in the city has provided a major boon to the region's economy, but also poses a threat to environmental protection and community safety.

== Education ==
Long Xuyên is home to An Giang University and the Long Xuyên Teacher's Training College. An Giang University is the second largest university in the Mekong Delta with over 10,000 students enrolled in 2021.

There are three main high schools in Long Xuyên city: Thoại Ngọc Hầu, Bình Khánh and Long Xuyên. Thoại Ngọc Hầu high school was once known as Long Xuyên high school, with currently over 2,000 students. Thoại Ngọc Hầu is a specialized school for majors of English, Mathematics, Chemistry, Physics, Literature, Geography, History and Biology.

== Culture ==
As Long Xuyen was designated as a city until 1999, many of its residents have moved from surrounding rural towns. The Long Xuyen Floating Market is an aspect of the more traditional life that remains from more rural times.

With its close proximity to Cambodia, the city has a significant number of Khmer residents.

=== Religion ===
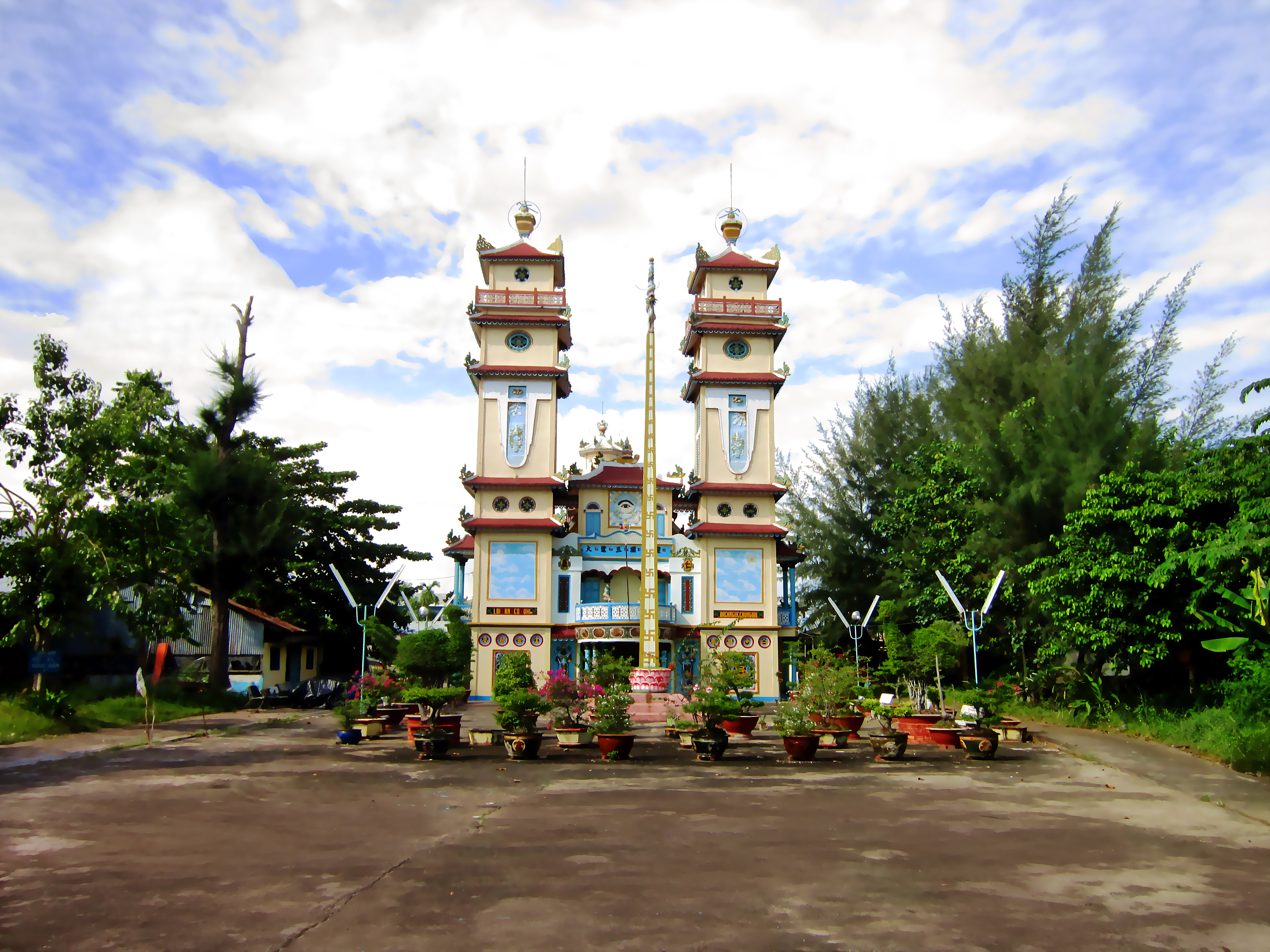
Long Xuyen Cao Dai temple

Long Xuyên has a rich religious make-up. It is founding place of the Hòa Hảo Buddhist sect. There are also many Catholic churches and communities, with the Long Xuyen Diocese celebrating its 60th anniversary with 230,000 members in 2020. It is one of few cities with a Cao Dai temple.

Former president Tôn Đức Thắng's birthday is celebrated in Mỹ Hòa Hưng (Tiger Island).

=== Cuisine ===
With its proximity to Cambodian border to the north, the coastline of the Gulf of Thailand (Pacific Ocean) to the west (of nearby Kien Giang province), and the Mekong River dissecting surrounding towns (but Hau River dissecting the city itself), the cuisine of Long Xuyen is heavily influenced by both local goods as well as products passing through. More locally, basa fish, mắm thái, and thot not coconuts are considered locally produced ingredients. Bun Ca Long Xuyen is a distinct specialty to the city that can be found by street vendors, who make a broth with snakehead fish and tamarind to eat with rice noodles and herbs.

=== Sports ===
Long Xuyen is home to An Giang Football Club (Câu lạc bộ bóng đá An Giang) which plays in the V.League 2, the second tier of Vietnamese professional soccer.

== Transportation ==
Regular buses run between Long Xuyên and other cities. The nearest airports to Long Xuyên are Can Tho International Airport, located 45 km (28 mi) west and Rach Gia Airport, located 45 km (28 mi) south from the city's center.

== Notable residents ==
- Bạch Tuyết, singer, actress, director, and writer
- Bùi Vĩ Hào, football player
- Lê Quang Vinh, Hòa Hảo leader
- Phạm Đức Tuấn, a light music singer
- Nguyễn Ngọc Thơ, vice-president of the Republic of Vietnam (before April 30, 1975)
- Tạ Minh Tâm, an opera vocalist
- Tôn Đức Thắng, senior Communist Party leader, President of the Democratic Republic of Vietnam (North Vietnam); later became the first President of the Socialist Republic of Vietnam
- Võ Tòng Xuân, agronomist and former rector of An Giang University
- Vương Trung Hiếu, writer

== Gallery ==
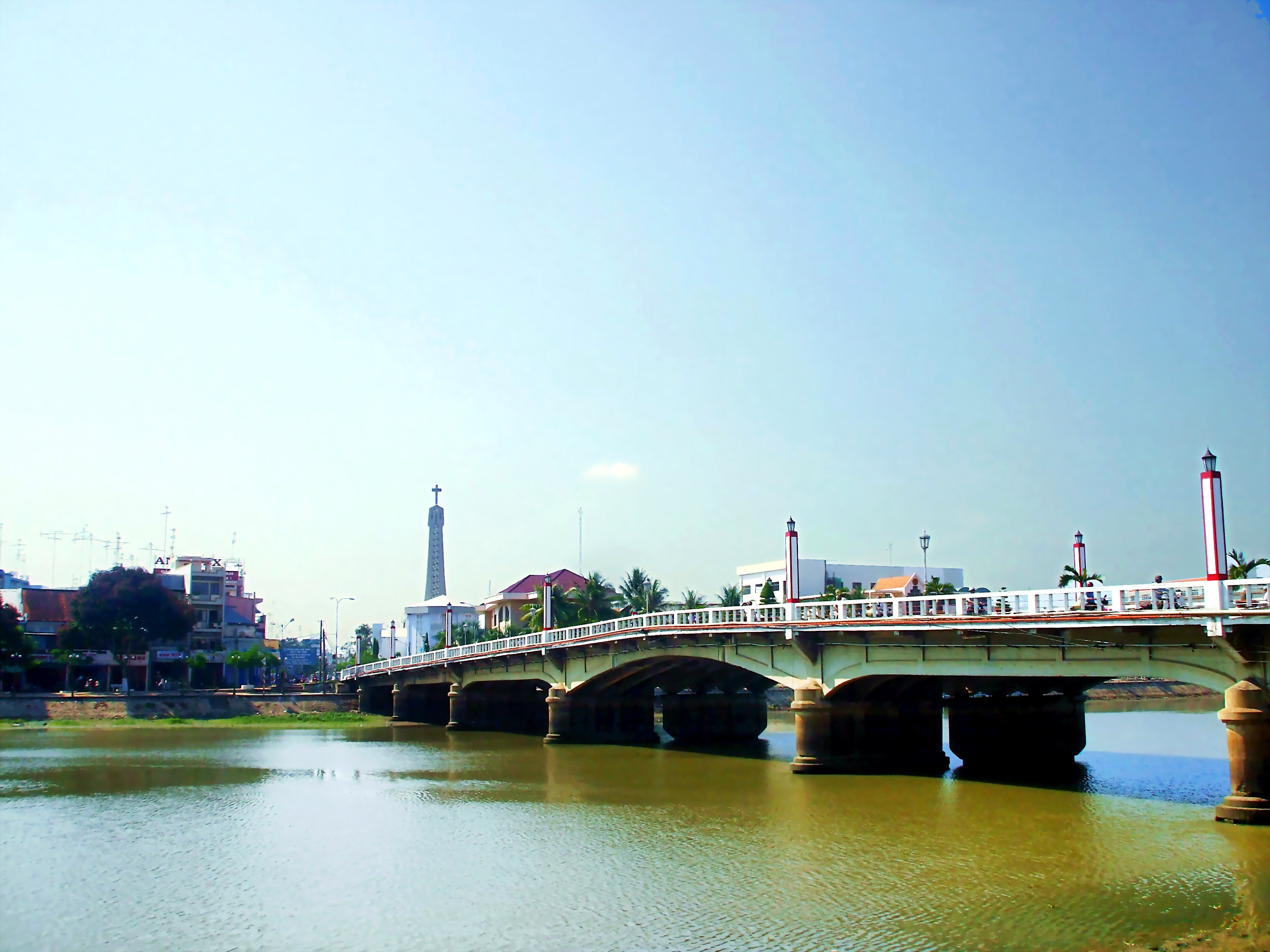
Hoàng Diệu Bridge

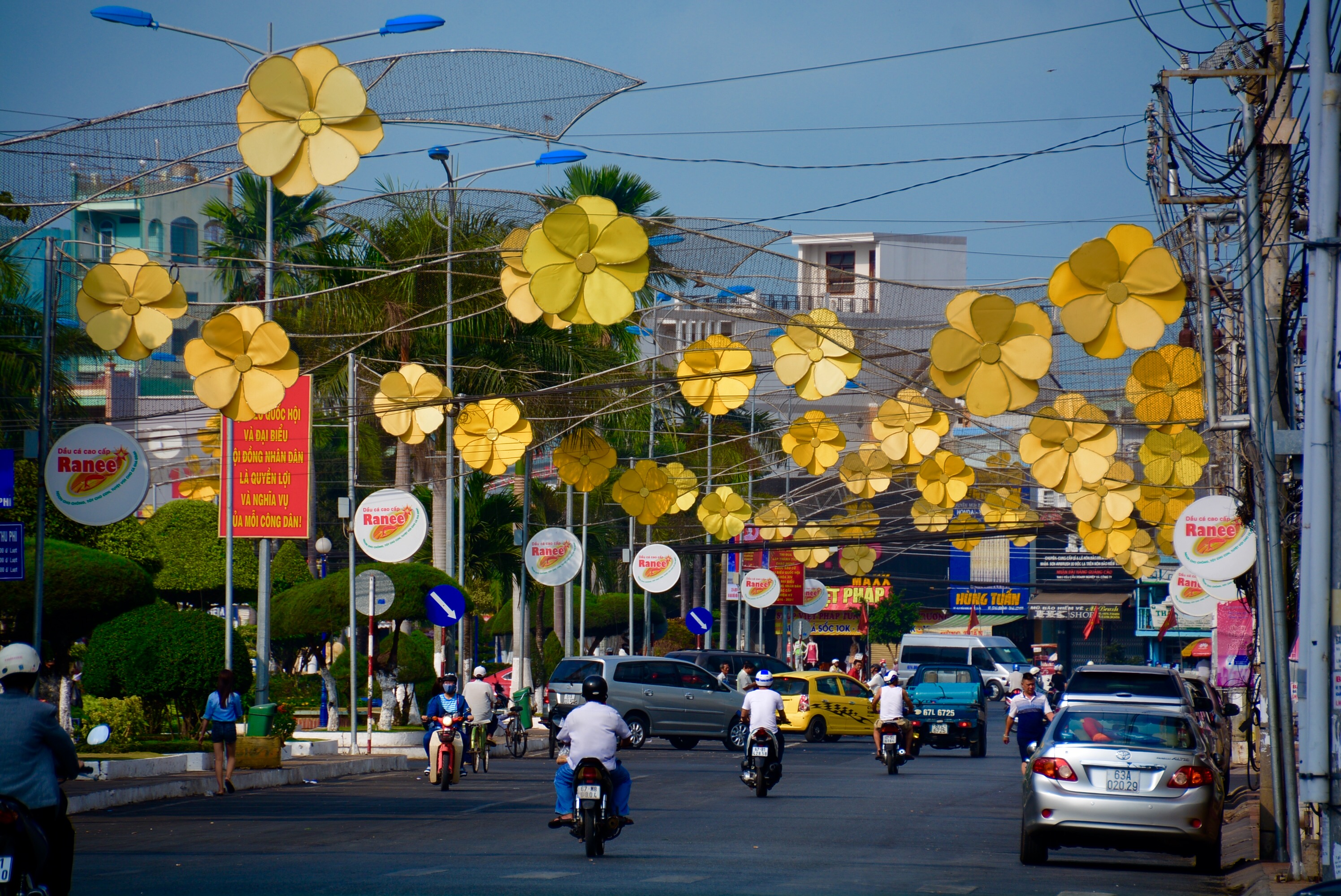
Hai Ba Trung street

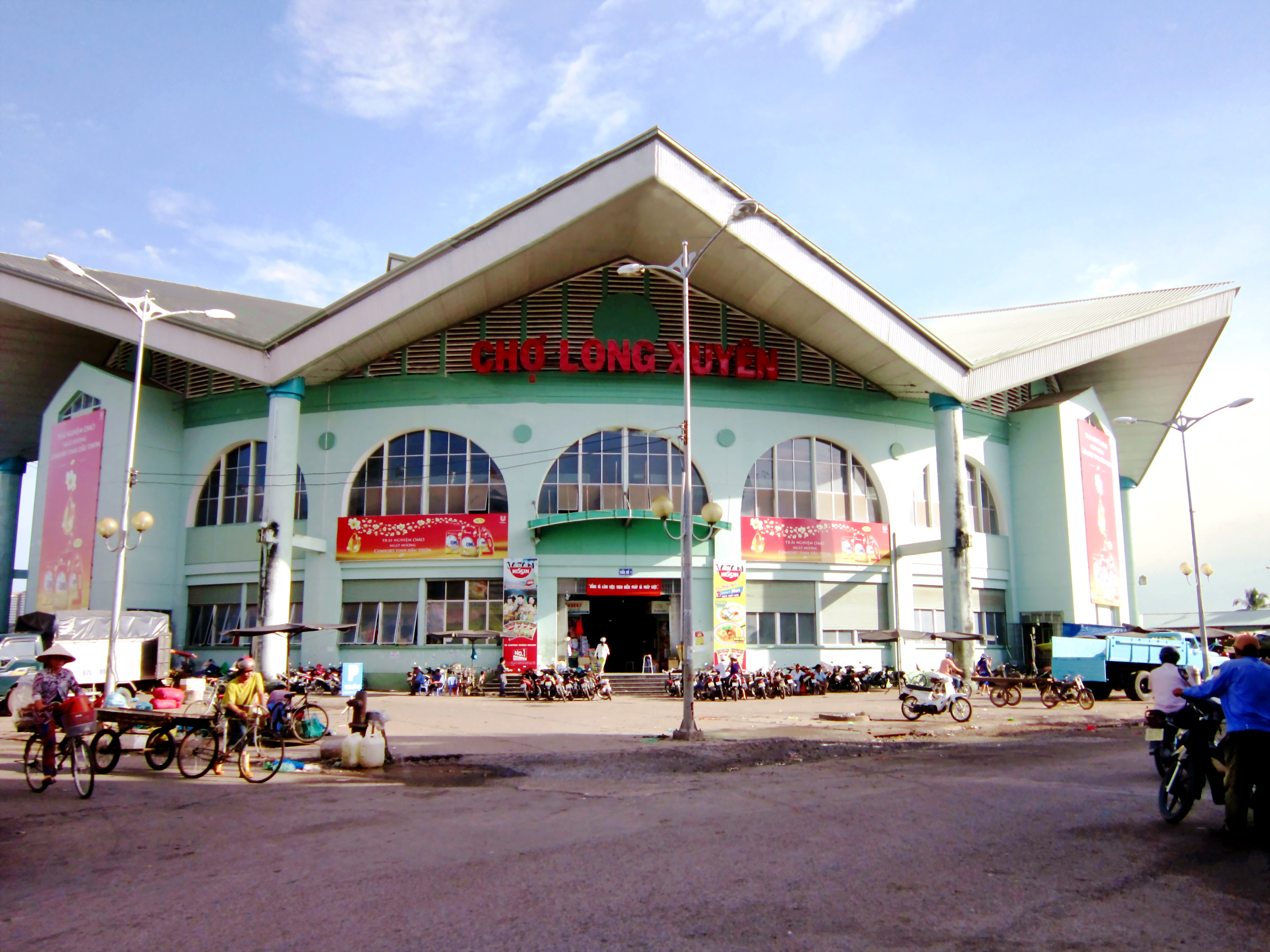
Historic Long Xuyen Marketplace

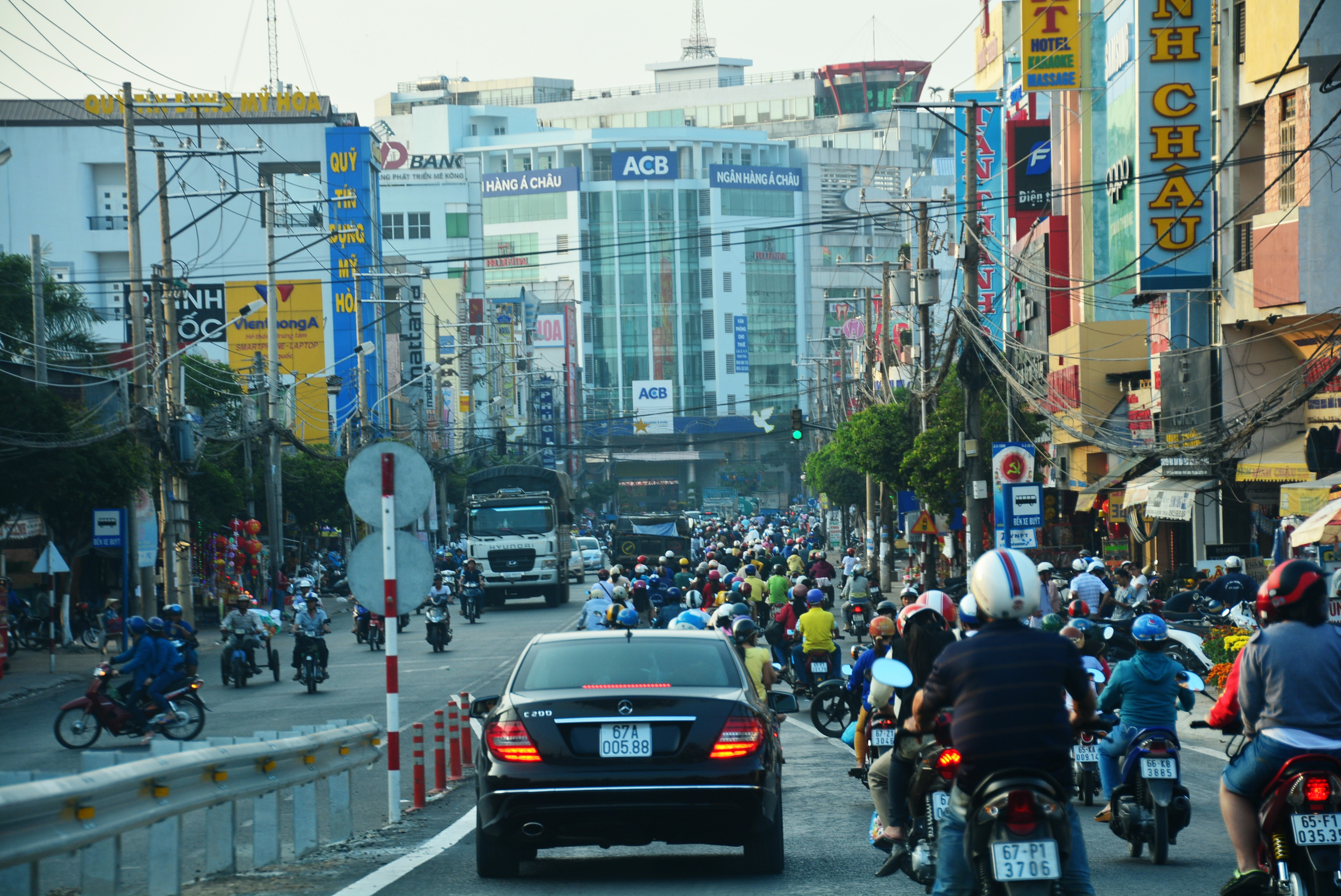
Tran Hung Dao street to the city center

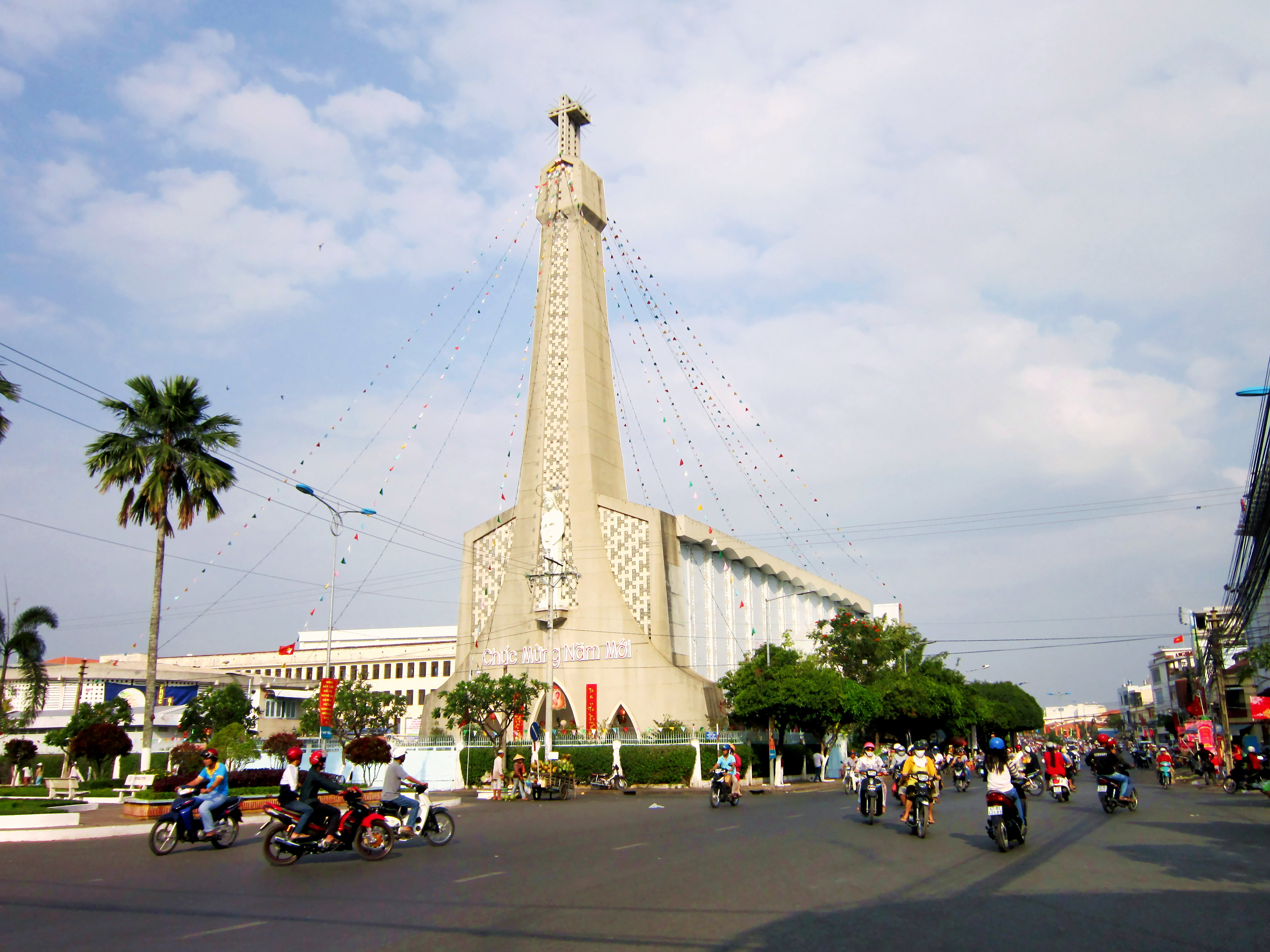
Nhà_thờ chính tòa thành_phố Long Xuyên
