= Hà Tiên (disambiguation) =

Hà Tiên is a ward of An Giang province, Vietnam.

Hà Tiên may also refer to:

- Hà Tiên (city), a former city in Kiên Giang province
- Hà Tiên, An Giang: ward in An Giang province
- Hà Tiên Islands: the archipelago is located in An Giang province, and administratively belongs to Tiên Hải island commune
- Hà Tiên province: former province of Vietnam
- Hà Tiên district: former district of Vietnam
- Principality of Hà Tiên, Hà Tiên Protectorate or Hà Tiên trấn
