= Long Xuyên (disambiguation) =

Long Xuyên may refer to:

- Long Xuyên, An Giang, ward of An Giang province, Vietnam
- Long Xuyên (city), former provincial city of An Giang province, Vietnam
- Long Xuyên province, French colonial period name of An Giang province
