= Nguyễn Minh Nhựt =

Vietnamese footballer

Personal information
- Full name: Nguyễn Minh Nhựt
- Date of birth: March 28, 1986 (age 40)
- Place of birth: Long Xuyên, An Giang, Vietnam
- Height: 1.85 m (6 ft 1 in)
- Position: Goalkeeper

Team information
- Current team: Bắc Ninh
- Number: 86

Youth career
- 2005–2011: Hồ Chí Minh City

Senior career*
Years	Team	Apps	(Gls)
2012–2013	Xuân Thành Sài Gòn	17	(0)
2014–2015	Hùng Vương An Giang	6	(0)
2015–2016	Hoàng Anh Gia Lai	19	(0)
2016–2017	QNK Quảng Nam	16	(0)
2017–2018	Long An	6	(0)
2018	Nam Định	0	(0)
2018–2019	XSKT Cần Thơ	21	(0)
2020	Hải Phòng	0	(0)
2020	Quảng Nam	1	(0)
2022	Đồng Nai		
2023	Gia Định		
2024–	Bắc Ninh		
- * Club domestic league appearances and goals as of 20 April 2018

Nguyễn Minh Nhựt (born 28 March 1986) is a Vietnamese footballer who plays as a goalkeeper for Bắc Ninh.

== Club career ==
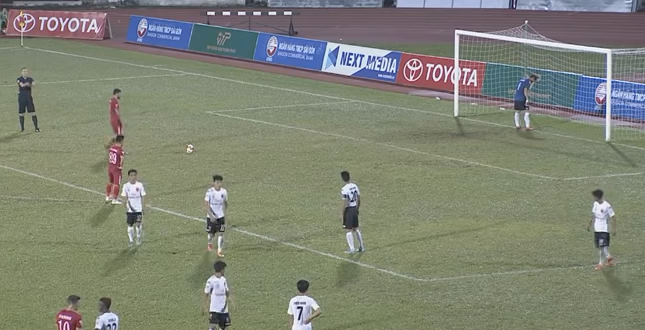
Minh Nhựt turns his back when Ho Chi Minh City player takes the penalty.

Minh Nhựt grabbed attention when in Long An's V.League 1 game against Ho Chi Minh City on 19 February 2017 the referee awarded the opposing team a penalty in stoppage time of the game with the score tied at 2–2. In protest of the referee's decision Minh Nhựt made no attempt to save the resulting spot kick even turning his back to the penalty taker. Following that Minh Nhựt and the other Long An players made no attempt to stop TP Ho Chi Minh City from scoring another two goals in a match which ended 5–2. Following the incident, Minh Nhựt received a two-year ban from playing by the Vietnam Football Federation, but the sanction was later reduced to one year.
