= Hà Tiên Islands =

Archipelago in western Vietnam

Hải Tặc Archipelago (archipel des Pirates)
Native name: Quần đảo Hà Tiên, quần đảo Hải Tặc
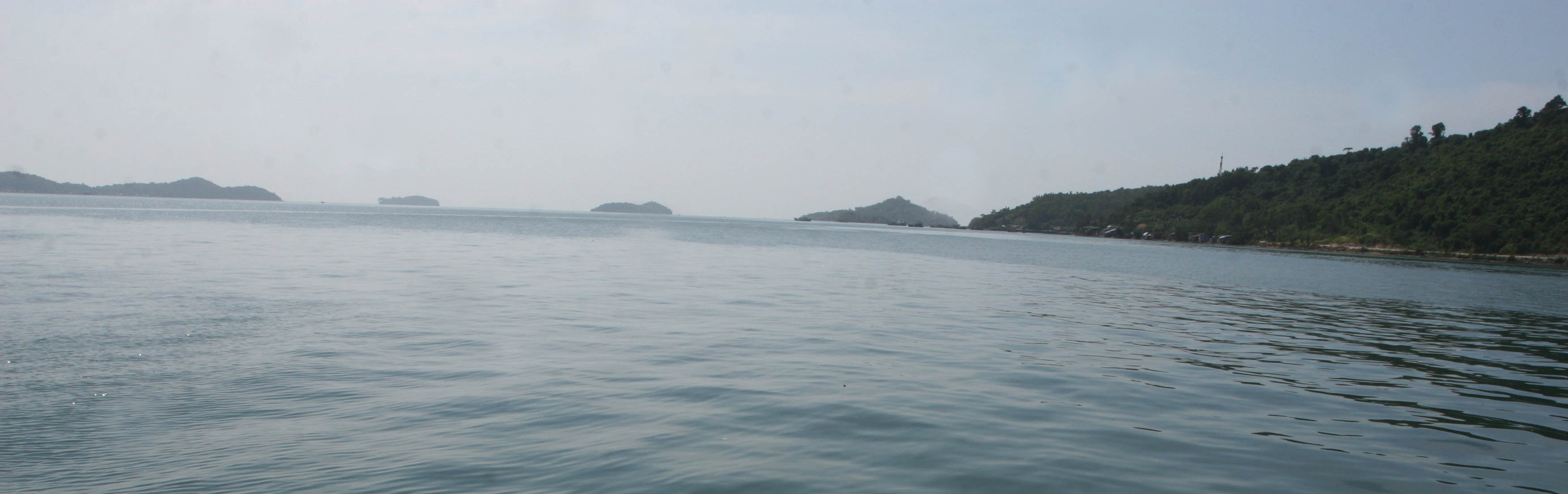
- A part of Hà Tiên Islands

- Location within Vietnam

Geography
- Location: Gulf of Thailand
- Coordinates: 10°10′08″N 104°20′00″E
- Total islands: 16 (14)
- Major islands: hòn Đốc
- Area: 11 km^{2} (4.2 sq mi)

Administration
- Vietnam
- Province: An Giang
- District-level town: Hà Tiên
- Commune: Tiên Hải

Hà Tiên Islands (Vietnamese: Quần đảo Hà Tiên) is an archipelago located in the Gulf of Thailand. It constitutes Tien Hai Commune of Hà Tiên, An Giang Province, Vietnam. Since pirates used to plague the region in the past, another popular name for the islands is Hải Tặc Islands (Quần đảo Hải Tặc, literally "Pirate Islands").

== Geography ==
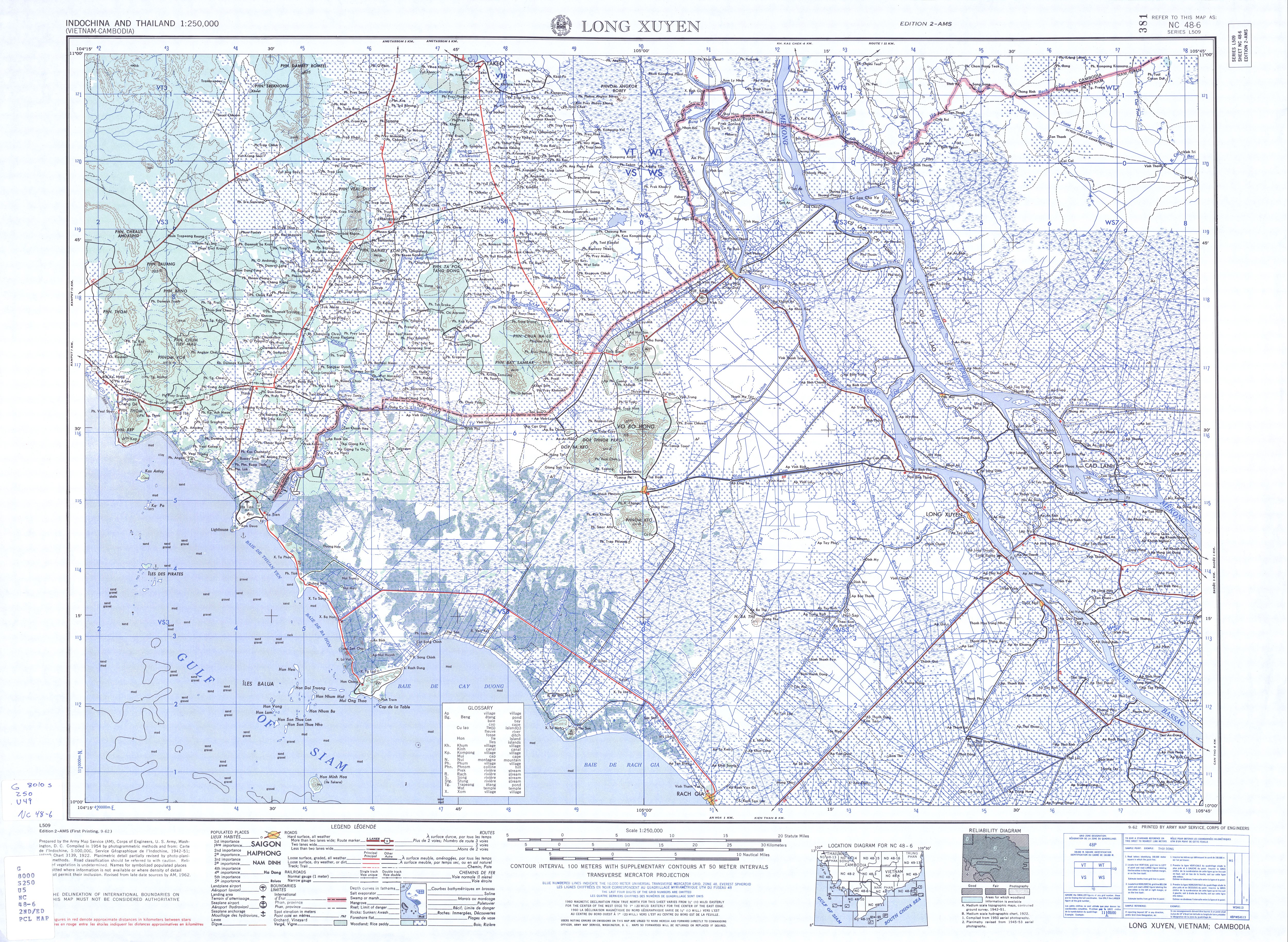
Map including the Hà Tiên Islands (labeled as the Îles des Pirates) (AMS, 1954)

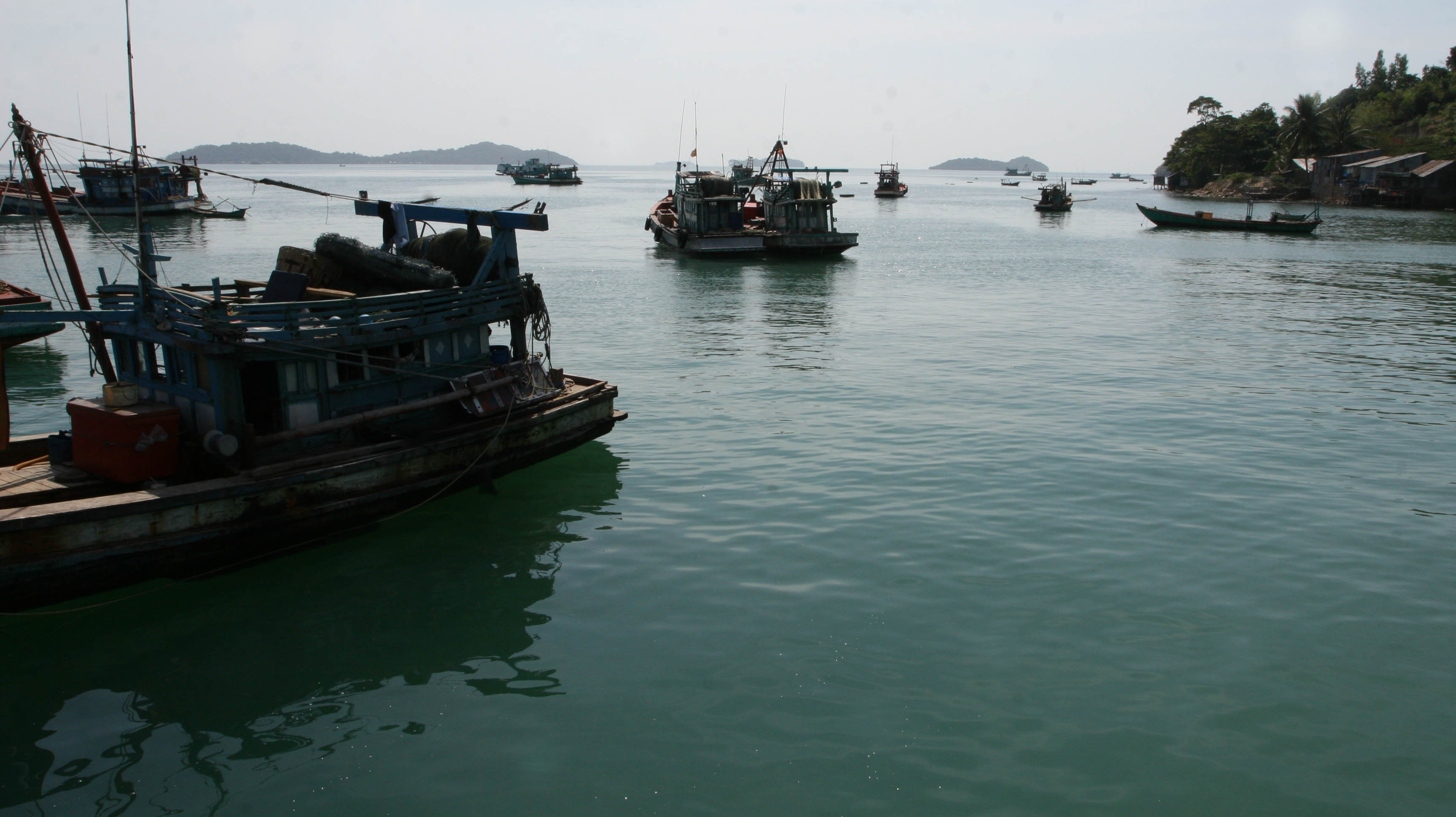
A dock in Hà Tiên Islands. Photo: Đỗ Doãn Hoàng.

The Hà Tiên Islands lie off the coast of Hà Tiên, to the east of Phú Quốc Island. The archipelago is in turn 11 nautical miles (20 km; 13 mi), 9.7 nautical miles (18.0 km; 11.2 mi) and 16 nautical miles (30 km; 18 mi) away from the coast of Hà Tiên, the mainland of Vietnam and Phú Quốc Island. There are in total 16 islands (other sources cited: 14) locating close to one another with a height of less than 100 metres (330 ft), and among those, Hon Doc (hòn Đốc) is the largest entity. The total area of the islands is 11 square kilometres (4.2 sq mi) spreading out over a water area which is 5 kilometres (3.1 mi) in length and 7 kilometres (4.3 mi) in width. The islands are composed primarily of Cretaceous shale and sandstone. Fresh water is scarce.

== History ==
=== Etymology ===
The Hà Tiên Islands were also formerly known as Pirate Islands since the late 17th century and early 18th century when it served as pirates' dens. Pirates departing from here attacked and seized large merchant ships from China and the Western world.

The islands were still known as Hải Tặc ("Pirate") Islands under the administration of South Vietnam. On July 28, 1958, an ARVN military mission visited the islands and later erected a sovereignty stele which still stands on the western part of the island Hon Doc.

=== Piracy in the past ===
Due to the rugged topography as well as the position on the important trade route, the islands were an ideal base for pirates to hide, ambush and attack crossing merchant ships for a long time. The golden era of piracy was when Hà Tiên fell into anarchy following the defeat of Mạc Thiên Tứ's administration by Siamese army. Meanwhile, foreign ships with which pirate vessels mingled still had freedom of navigation in the area. Even when the French occupied Hà Tiên, this area was still being ravaged by piracy.

There are some rumors about pirate treasure hiding in Hà Tiên Islands. In March 1983, an American and a British departing from Phú Quốc Island secretly visited the island of Hon Tre Nho (hòn Tre Nhỏ) in the archipelago and brought radios, cameras, binoculars, and nautical charts. After being captured by local residents, two men claimed that they had a 300-year-old map passed down by their ancestors depicting pirate treasure. In 2009, some fishermen accidentally found a quantity of ancient coins.

== Demography ==
Only 6 to 7 islands in the archipelago are inhabited. According to Decree No. 47/1998/ND-CP establishing the town of Hà Tiên in 1998, Hà Tiên Islands had 1,055 inhabitants. In early 2012, the island had more than 420 households with nearly 1,800 people.

== Economy ==
Local residents live mainly by fishing. In 2011, the total output of marine products was 22,000 tons. Per capita income is about 48 million đồng (nearly 2,300 U.S dollars). The water shortage in the dry season has been solved thanks to a freshwater reservoir. In 2007 and 2008, Kien Giang provincial government laid down a policy to lease a number of islands of Ha Tien Islands to develop marine ecotourism.
