= Long Xuyên, An Giang =

Long Xuyên
- Ward
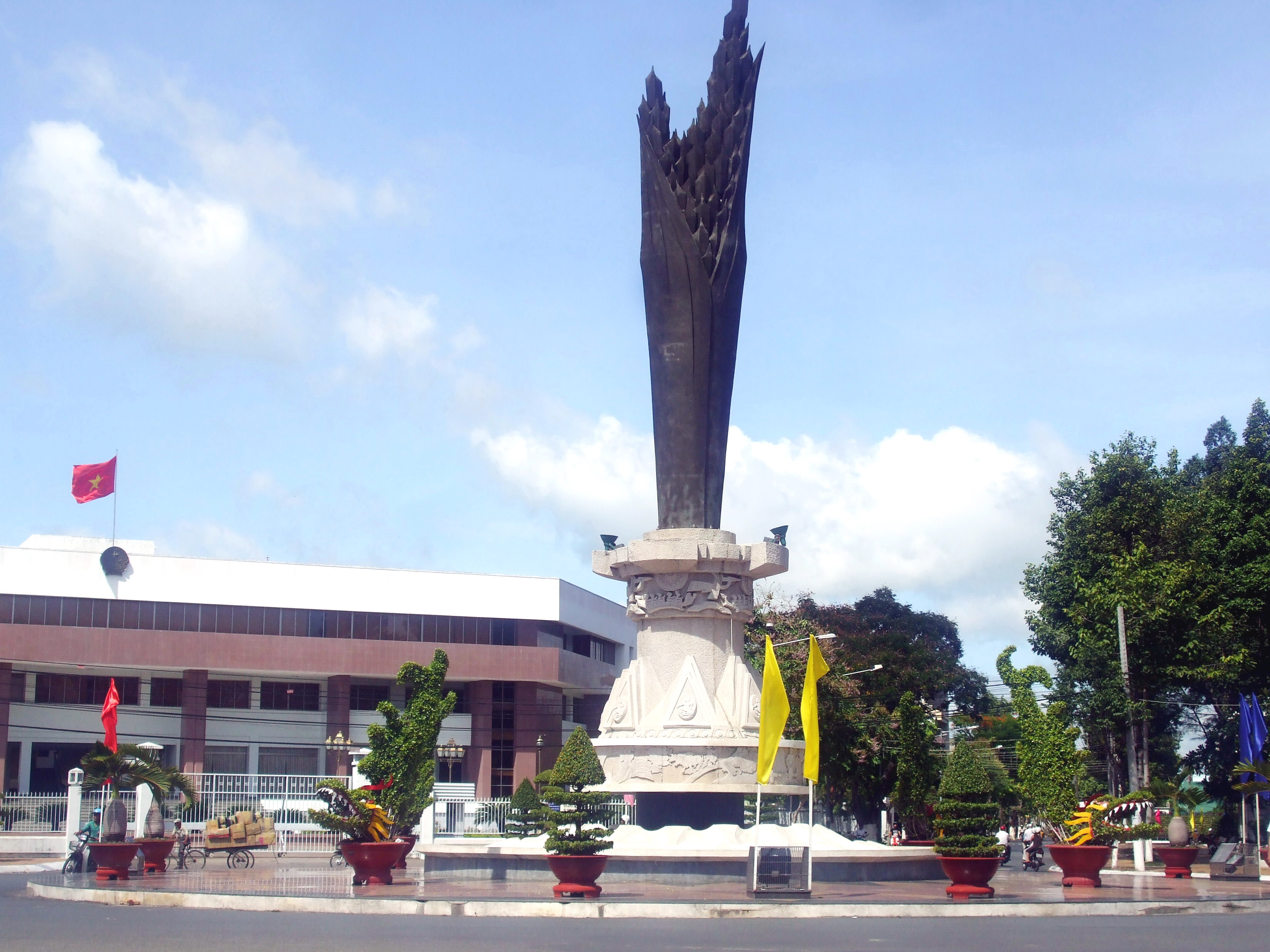
- Rice stalk monument in Long Xuyên ward.

- Location in Vietnam
- Coordinates: 10.3655°N 105.4011°E
- Country: Vietnam
- Province: An Giang
- Establish: June 16, 2025

Area
  - Total: 11.58 sq mi (29.98 km^{2})

Population (2025)
  - Total: 154,858 people
  - Density: 13,380/sq mi (5,165/km^{2})
- Time zone: UTC+07:00 (Indochina Time)
- Climate: Aw

Long Xuyên is a ward in An Giang province, Vietnam. It is one of 102 communes, wards, and special zones in the province following the 2025 reorganization.

== Geography ==
Long Xuyên is a ward in An Giang province. The ward has the following geographical location:

- To the north, it borders Bình Đức ward.
- To the west, it borders Phú Hòa commune.
- To the south, it borders Mỹ Thới ward.
- To the east, it borders Hội An commune and Mỹ Hòa Hưng commune.
