= Hà Tiên (city) =

Provincial city in Kiên Giang Province, Mekong Delta in Vietnam

- Provincial city (Class-3)
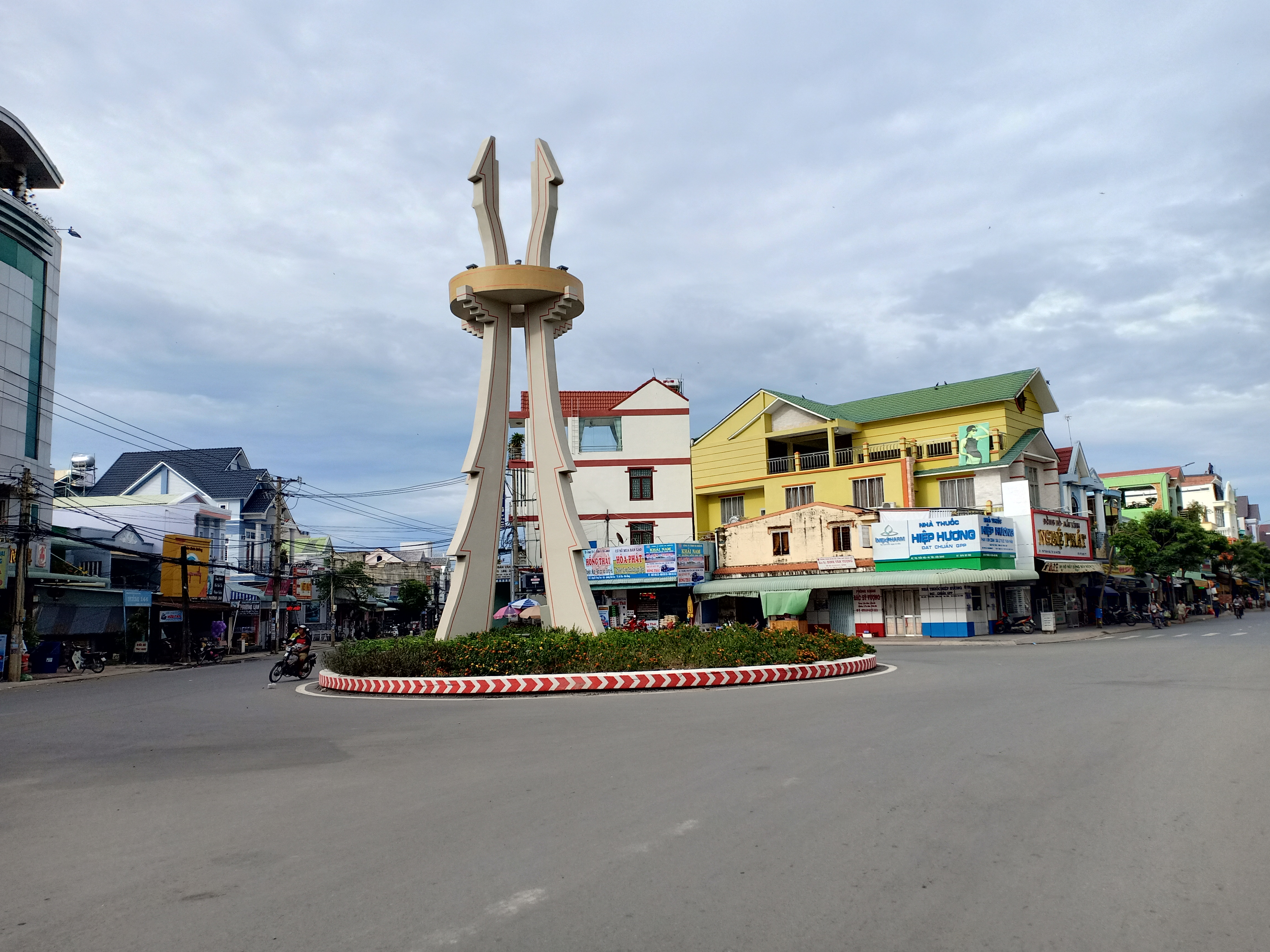
- Interactive map of Hà Tiên
- Location in Vietnam
- Coordinates: 10°23′N 104°29′E
- Country: Vietnam
- Province: Kiên Giang
- Dissolution: June 16, 2025

Area
  - Total: 100.49 km^{2} (38.80 sq mi)

Population (2019)
  - Total: 100,560
  - Density: 1,000.7/km^{2} (2,591.8/sq mi)
- Climate: Aw

Hà Tiên is a former provincial city belong to former Kiên Giang province, Mekong Delta in Vietnam. Its area is 10,049 ha (100.49 km^{2}; 38.80 sq mi) and the population as of 2019 is 81,576. The city borders Cambodia to the west. Hà Tiên is a tourist site of the region thanks to its beaches and landscapes. After its dissolution on June 16th, Hà Tiên provincial city was divided into Hà Tiên ward and Tô Châu ward belong to An Giang province, Vietnam.

== Etymology ==
The name "Hà Tiên" is derived from the Sino-Vietnamese word: 河僊 or 河仙, meaning "river spirit".

== History ==
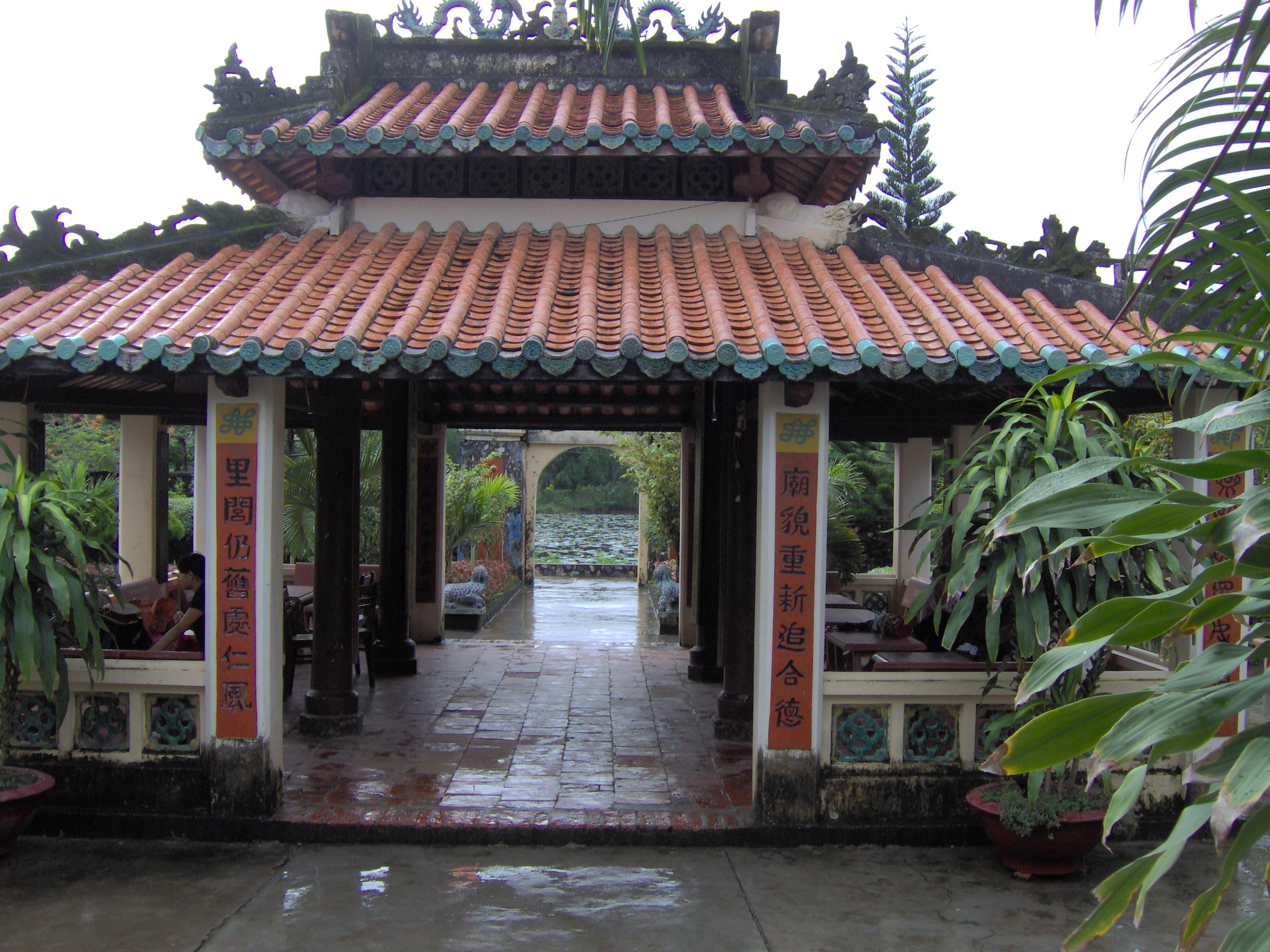
Mạc Cửu mausoleum

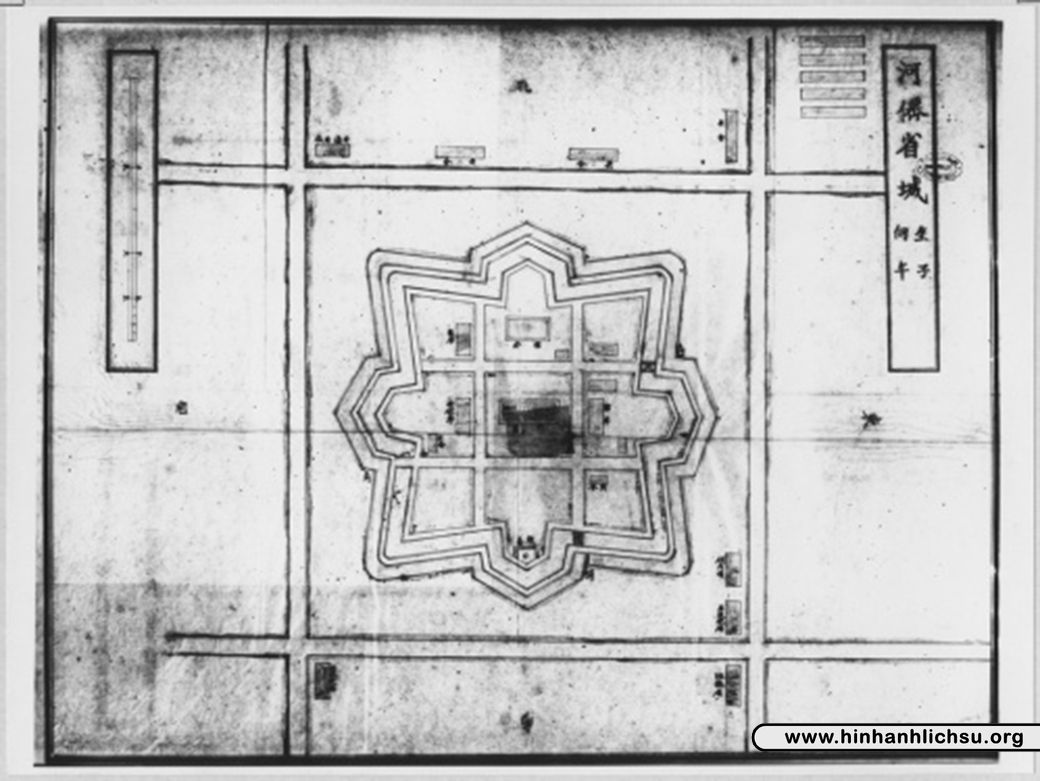
Drawing of Hà Tiên citadel in the Nguyễn dynasty

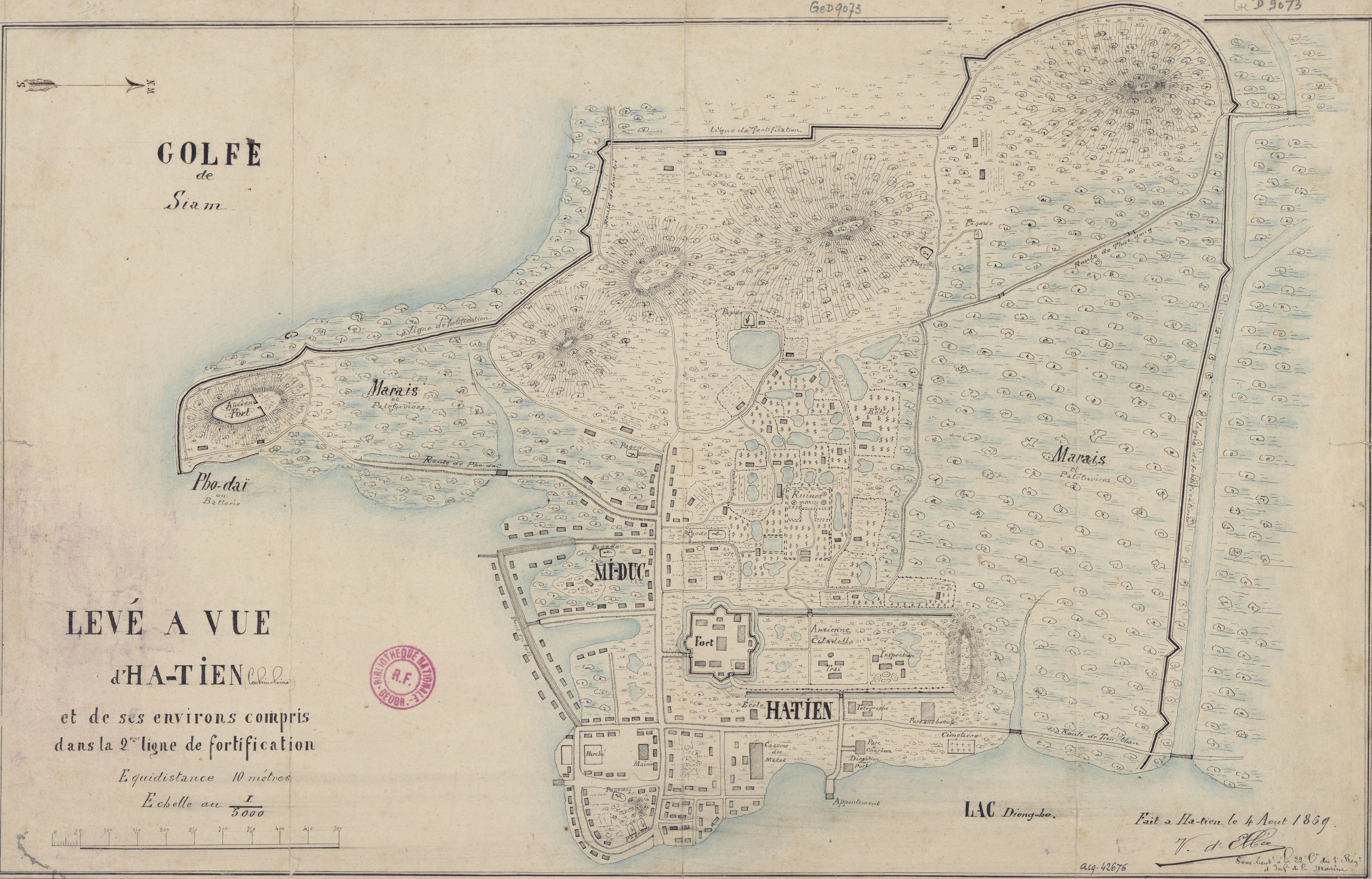
Map of Hà Tiên during French rule.

A settlement and a port seem to have existed at the site of the present town of Hà Tiên from a very early period. Ptolemy's Geography identified a town there as Akadra and that it was the port for the Cambodian district of Pithonobaste - Banteay Meas, all this being part of the Kingdom of Funan. The local capital of this district, also called Banteay Meas, was not on the coast, but located about a day's journey up the Giang-thành river. The name Banteay Meas, (Khmer: បន្ទាយមាស, Thai: บันทายมาศ; lit: "golden ramparts"), referred to the bamboo fortifications once used about the town. The town of Hà Tiên was originally known under the Khmer, name of Piem or Peam (Khmer: ពាម, Thai: เปียม, Chinese: 港口; also Pie, Pam, Bam), the Khmer for "port", "harbour" or "river mouth", while the Vietnamese called it Mang-Kham, from the Vietnamese term for the Khmers, "mang". It was through this port that Buddhism is said to have reached Cambodia, brought there by chance when a ship carrying Buddhaghosa was blown there by a storm in 415 AD.

Many works incorrectly referred to Hà-Tiên as “Panthaimas", the early name of the district in which it was located. It was variously spelled as Panday-mas (Khmer), Ponteamass (English), Phutthaimat (Thai: พุทไธมาศ) or Banthaimat (Thai: บันทายมาศ), Ponthiamas or Pontheaymas (French), Pontiano (Robert's Map, 1751), Panthai-mas, Bantaimas, Pontiamas, Pontaimas, Bantay-mas, Banteay M’eas, Pontiamas, Pontiamasse, Po-taimat, and infinite other variations.

Hà Tiên was established by a small group of Chinese people, mostly men who supported the Ming Dynasty and were opposed to the Qing Dynasty, led by Mo Jiu (Mạc Cửu). When they arrived in Đàng Trong (as southern Vietnam was called while under the rule of the Nguyễn lords), the Nguyễn lords ordered the king of Cambodia (then a vassal state of Đàng Trong) to grant land to these Chinese people. These people built markets in this place and turned it into a busy business town. Vietnamese people gradually arrived there. This town later was merged into Vietnamese territory when Mo Jiu delivered its sovereignty to the Nguyễn Lords. Mo Jiu was then conferred the position of ruler of this town. It was at this time that the name Hà Tiên (河仙 - "River Spirit"), referring to the guardian deity of the Giang-thành river, was conferred on the town by the lord Nguyễn Phúc Chu.

== Climate ==
Climate data for Hà Tiên
Month	Jan	Feb	Mar	Apr	May	Jun	Jul	Aug	Sep	Oct	Nov	Dec	Year
Record high °C (°F)	31.6 (88.9)	32.6 (90.7)	32.3 (90.1)	33.1 (91.6)	34.5 (94.1)	32.6 (90.7)	32.1 (89.8)	32.1 (89.8)	31.7 (89.1)	32.0 (89.6)	32.1 (89.8)	32.0 (89.6)	34.5 (94.1)
Daily mean °C (°F)	25.6 (78.1)	26.5 (79.7)	26.9 (80.4)	27.9 (82.2)	28.0 (82.4)	27.5 (81.5)	27.0 (80.6)	26.9 (80.4)	26.7 (80.1)	26.4 (79.5)	26.1 (79.0)	25.4 (77.7)	26.7 (80.1)
Record low °C (°F)	16.1 (61.0)	19.5 (67.1)	20.0 (68.0)	19.6 (67.3)	21.0 (69.8)	20.2 (68.4)	20.9 (69.6)	20.7 (69.3)	20.9 (69.6)	20.1 (68.2)	17.1 (62.8)	17.1 (62.8)	16.1 (61.0)
Average precipitation mm (inches)	22.8 (0.90)	17.9 (0.70)	60.0 (2.36)	132.7 (5.22)	202.1 (7.96)	234.5 (9.23)	300.7 (11.84)	289.6 (11.40)	256.5 (10.10)	269.6 (10.61)	151.4 (5.96)	62.5 (2.46)	2,000.1 (78.74)
Average relative humidity (%)	76.8	78.7	78.0	77.7	81.2	81.2	82.2	85.0	81.6	84.4	82.1	80.2	81.0
Source 1: The Yearbook of Indochina (mean temperature 1928-1933, humidity 1930-1933)
Source 2: Vietnam Institute for Building Science and Technology (precipitation 1992-2022)

== Economy ==
Around 22 km south of Hà Tiên is a large cement plant located in Kiên Lương. Its history goes back to the Republic of Vietnam (South Vietnam), where it was one of the largest industrial projects when construction was started in April 1961.

== Transportation ==
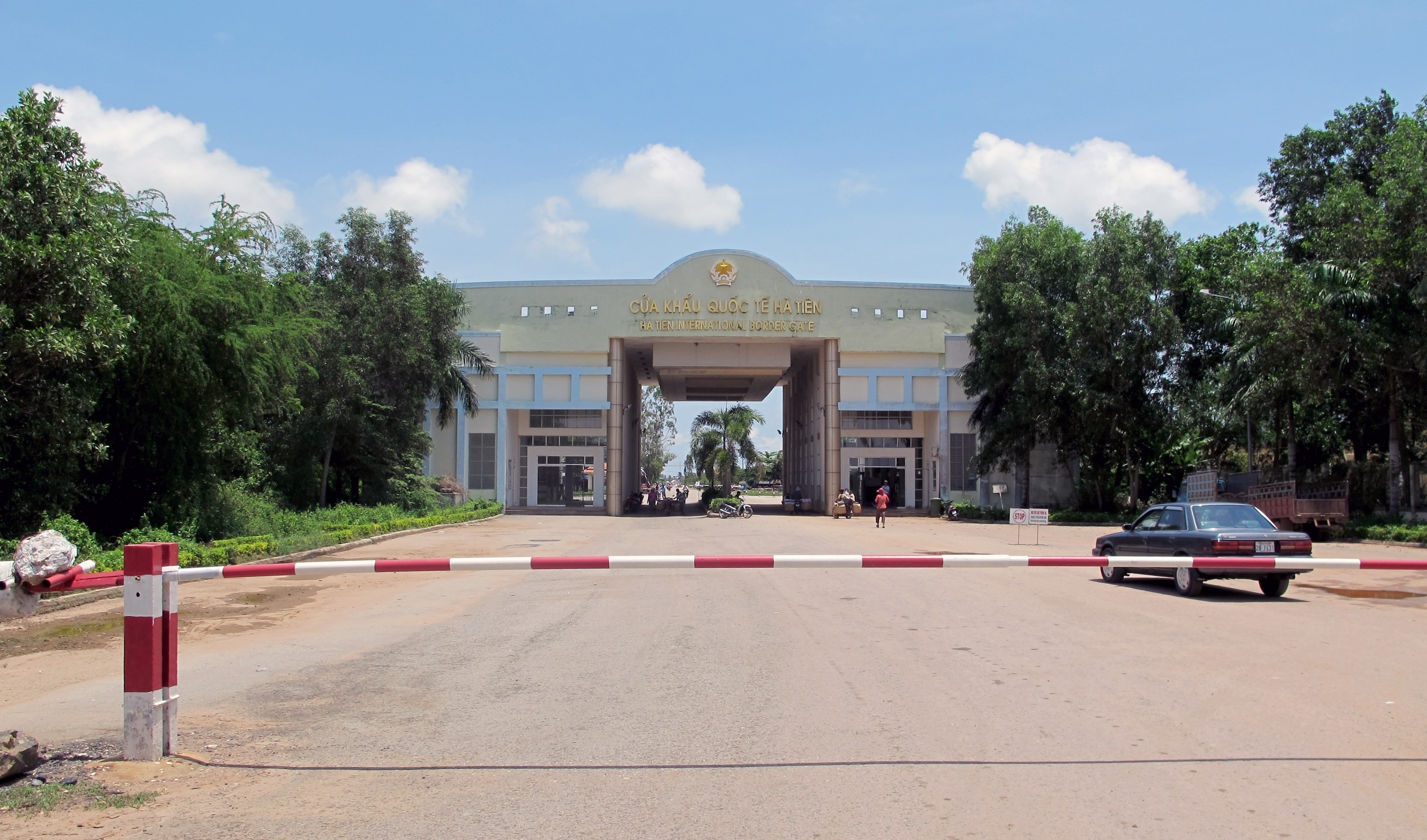
Vietnamese border gate next to Hà Tiên

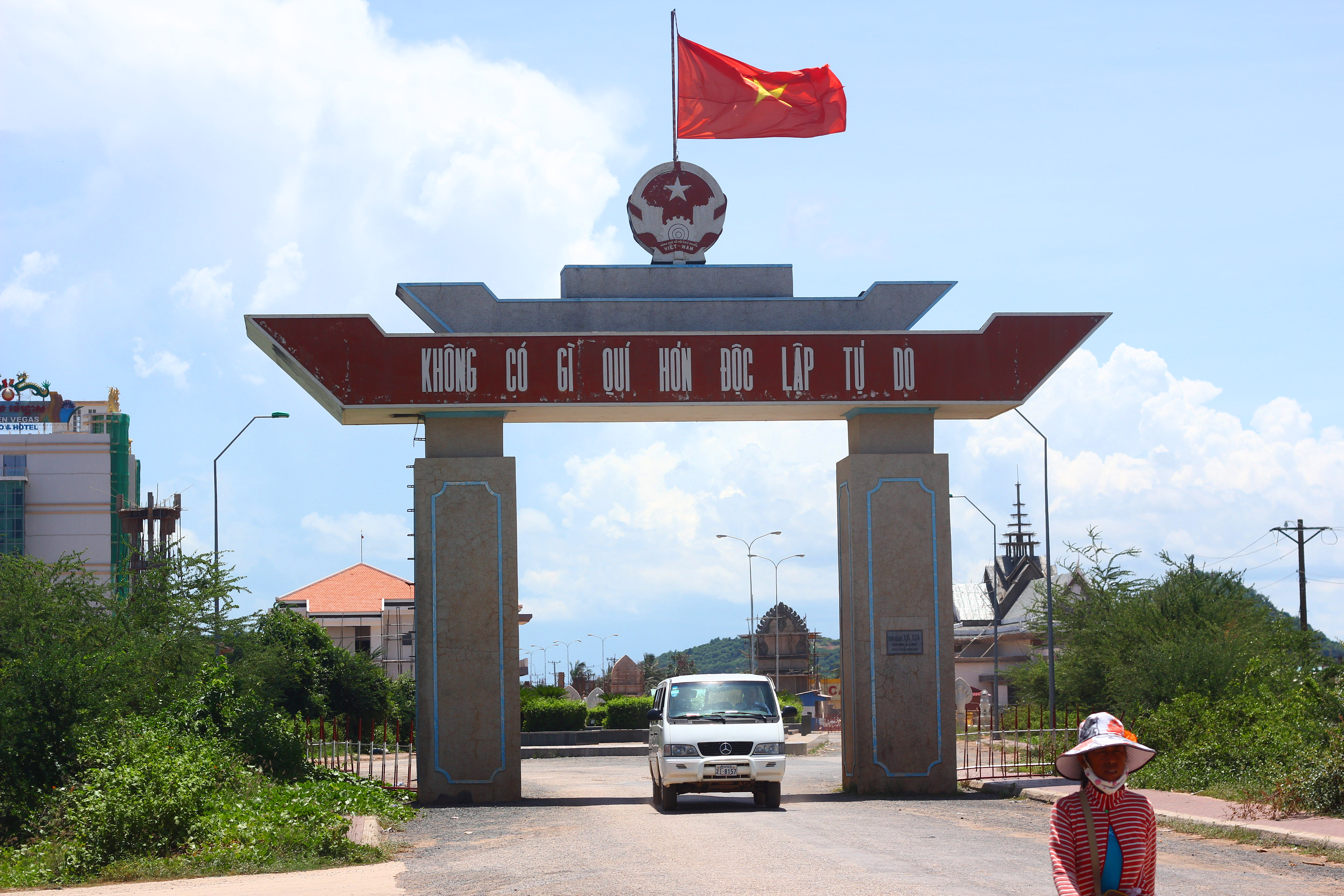
Border crossing Vietnam - Cambodia

=== Road transport ===
Buses connect Hà Tiên to the provincial capital Rạch Giá and many other towns in the Mekong Delta, including Châu Đốc, Can Tho, Ca Mau, Vung Tau and Saigon.

=== Sea transport ===
Daily fast ferries are available to Phú Quốc island. In the low (wet) season they normally operate twice a day - at approximately 08:00-08:30 and then 13:00-13:30 (times vary a bit according to tides/weather). In the high (dry) season they run more frequently, with up to 3 fast boats (Superdong) each making up to 3 crossings every day. The trip takes about 80–90 minutes. There are also now 4 car ferries operating from Hà Tiên to the north east corner of the island at Bai Thom. These run on demand, not to a fixed schedule and can start as early as 05:00 and run until 21:00. This takes about 2.5 hours.

=== Border crossing ===
A road border crossing between Vietnam and Cambodia, called the Hà Tiên International Border Gate, is located 7 km west of Hà Tiên in the village of Xà Xía. On the Cambodian side, the border crossing is known as the Prek Chak International Border Checkpoint in Kampong Trach District, Kampot. The border crossing was opened in 2007. It is open from 07:00 to 18:00. Besides conventional Vietnamese visas, this border crossing is also listed as a Vietnamese e-Visa point of entry for foreigners.

== See also ==
- Kiên Giang
- Phú Quốc
