= Floating markets of Vietnam =

Vietnamese markets where goods are sold from boats

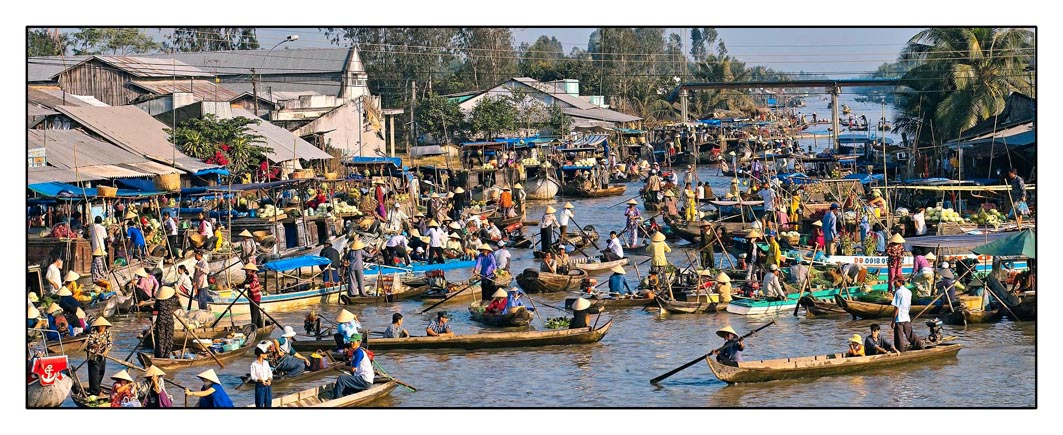
Chợ nổi Cà Mau

Floating markets of Vietnam, or chợ nổi in Vietnamese, are areas of commerce based within the country's many river systems. Vietnam's extensive network of floating markets is economically and culturally significant to the country.

== History ==
With two deltas from both the northern Red River and the southern Mekong River, floating markets were an important aspect of greater aquaculture-based society consisting of floating communities that inhabited the riversides of Vietnam. Archaeologists have found evidence that extensive trading networks likely existed in Vietnam's river deltas from as far back as 4,500 years ago. As far back as the 7th century, the southern riverways of the Mekong Delta were seen as prime migratory opportunities for those farther north. Many of the communities consisted of cultural groups now associated with modern-day ethnic groups, such as Kinh, Chams, and Khmer. The intersections of major riverways become major points of commerce and led to the proliferation of on-ground and floating markets. Although economic growth and emerging technology over the 19th century provided alternative commercial avenues, floating markets remained a central meeting place into the 21st century as road infrastructure gradually developed in the Delta regions. There have been increased efforts to preserve the traditional appearances of some floating markets as a form of both eco-tourism and cultural tourism.

== Vessels ==
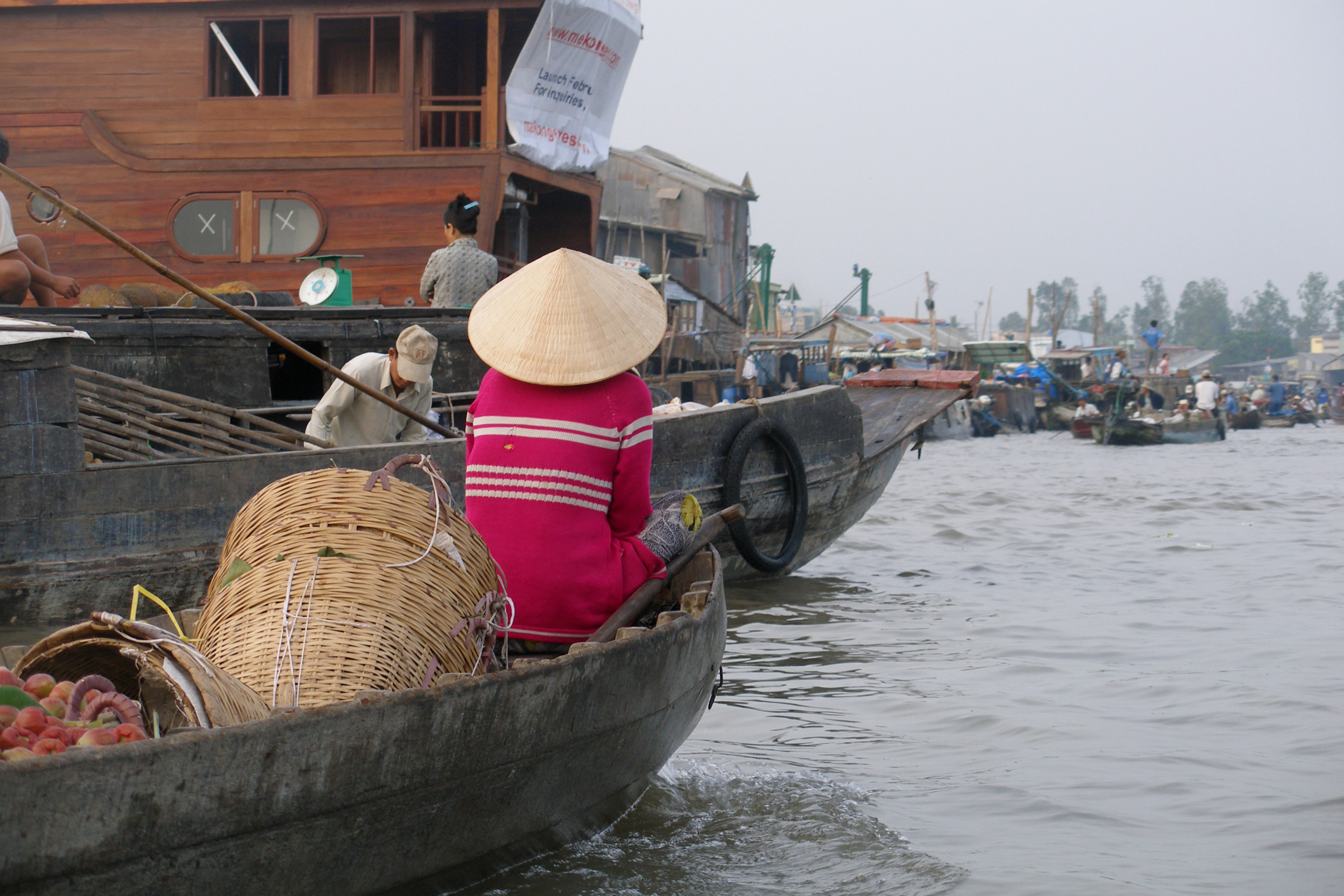
Vessels in a Floating Market in Can Tho

Due to Vietnam's frequent interaction with cultures and technologies from afar, a variety of vessels could be seen in Vietnam's floating markets. In current times, both modern boats, as well as traditional boats, are found, with wooden plank-keel boats being one of the more commonly used.

== Notable Markets ==
Cái Bè floating market operates within the Tien River and between three provinces Tien Giang Province, Vinh Long Province, and Ben Tre Province. Ngã Bảy floating market (also known as Phụng Hiệp) is based in Hậu Giang Province and sits at the intersection of seven water ways.

Cái Răng floating market sits near the city center of Can Tho, it is a favorite among tour groups due to the colorful paint of the boats as well as its reputation as a 'must-visit food hub'. The Cai Rang floating market is situated in the southern part of Vietnam, experiencing two distinct seasons: the rainy season, spanning from May to November, and the sunny season, lasting from December to April of the subsequent year. If you're interested in exploring the area during the flood season, which is the rainy season, it is the opportune time to do. On the other hand, if you're a fan of fruits, the dry season is recommended for your visit.

Long Xuyên floating market is near Long Xuyen's city center and is known for its peek into the Mekong's rustic way of life, with floating houses dotting the riverside and products catered towards residents.

== Gallery ==
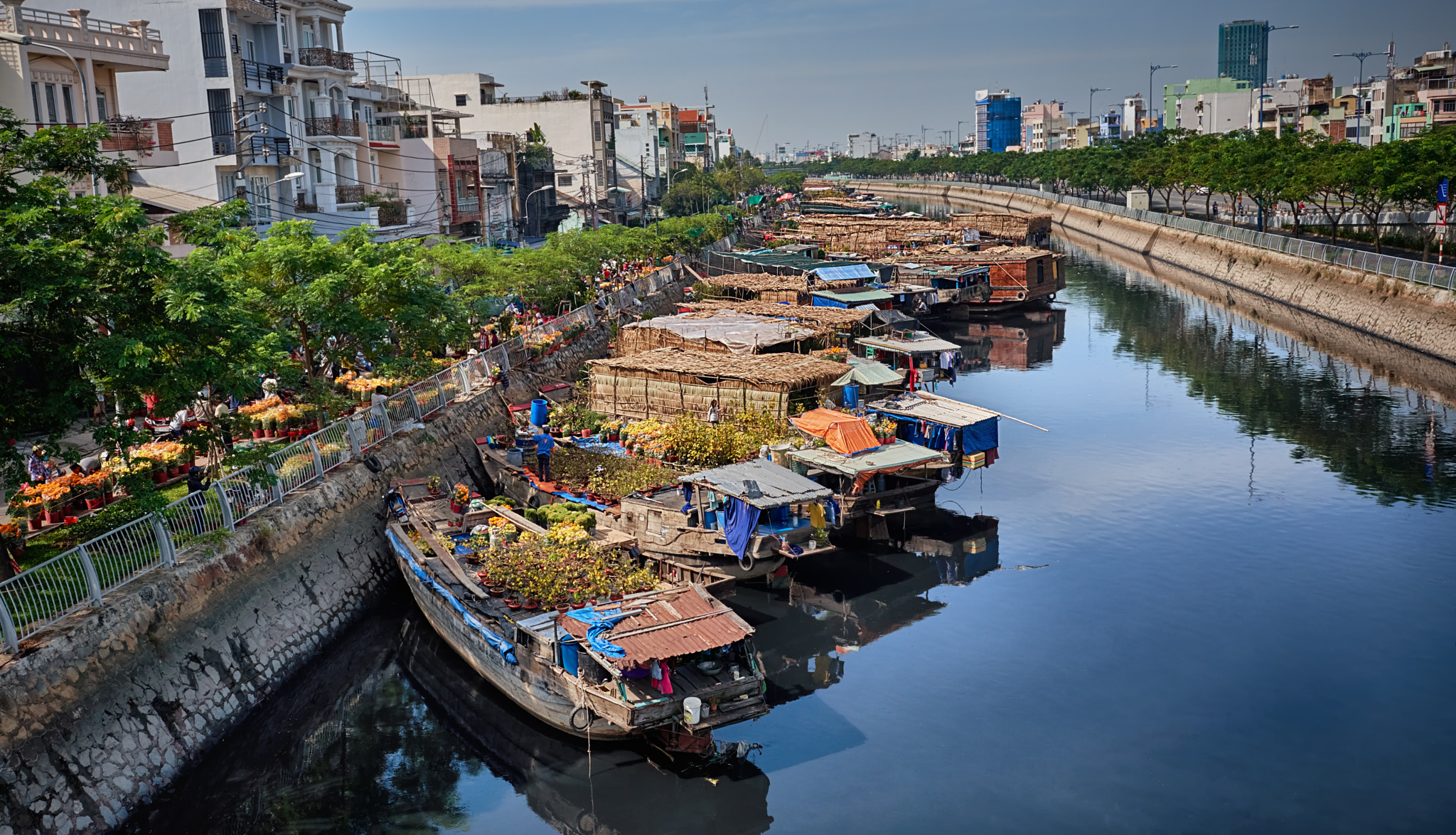

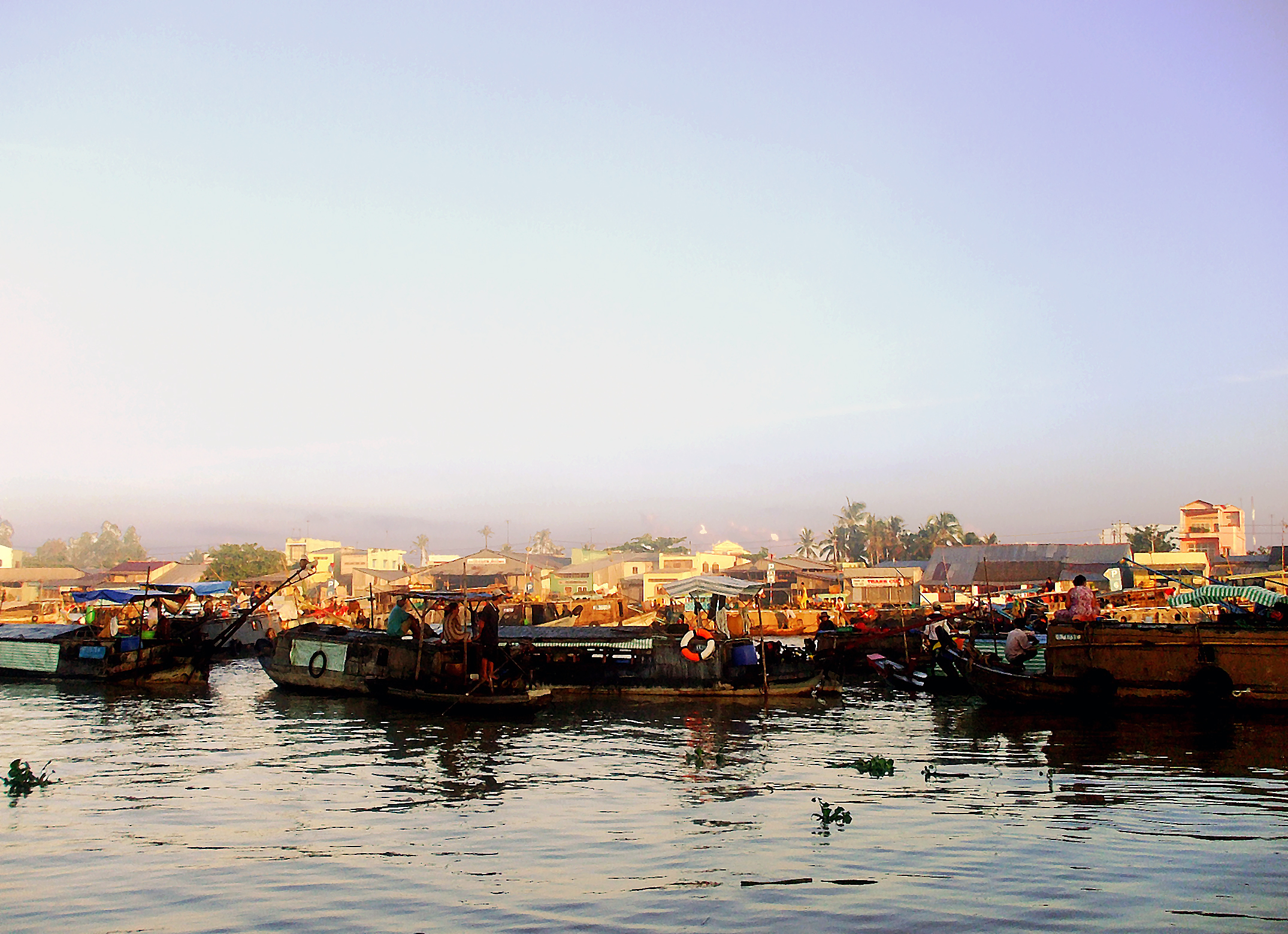

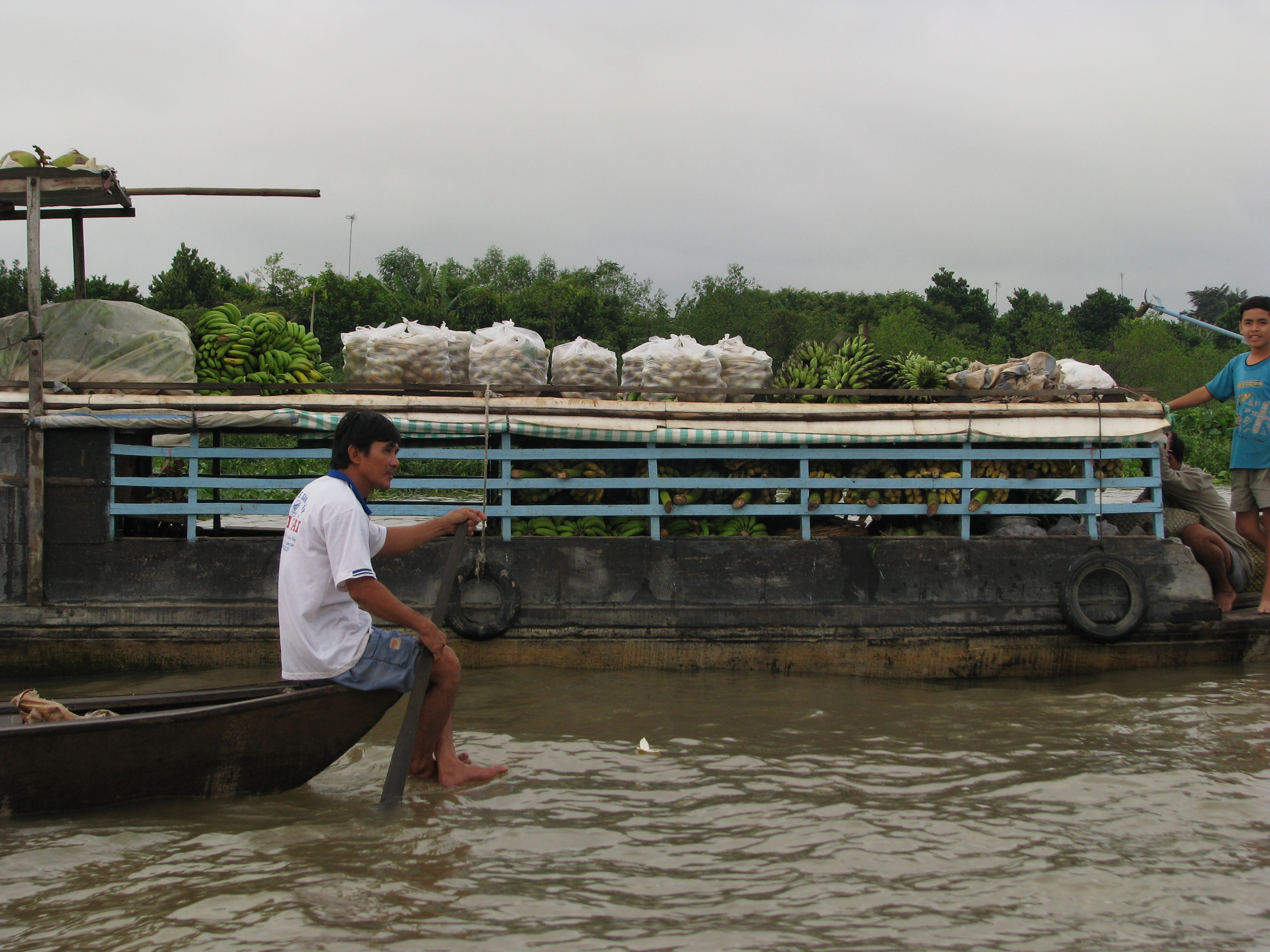

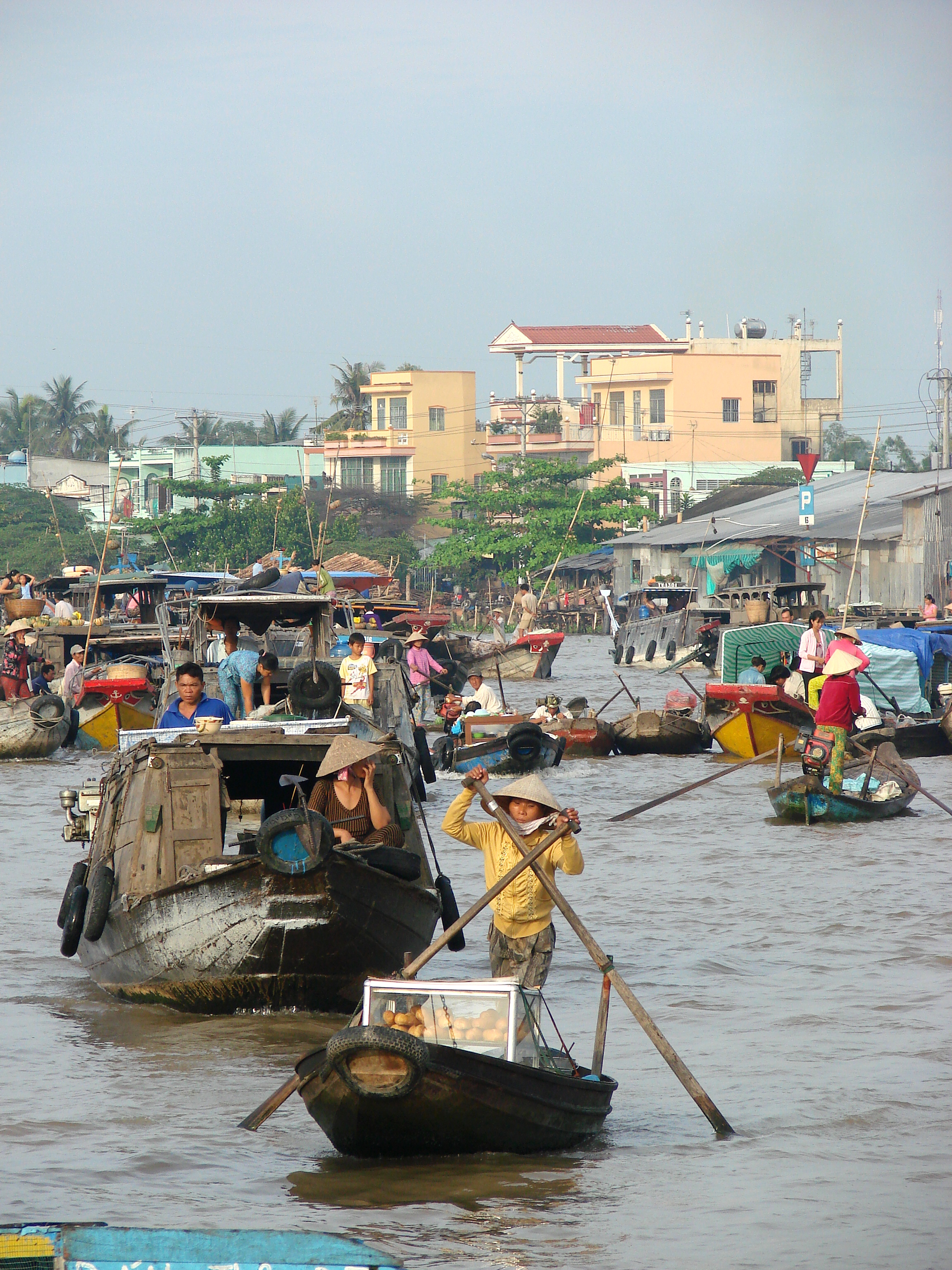
