= An Giang University =

Vietnamese public university

Coordinates: 10.3718°N 105.4312°E

VNU-HCM An Giang University
- Trường Đại học An Giang, Đại học Quốc gia Thành phố Hồ Chí Minh
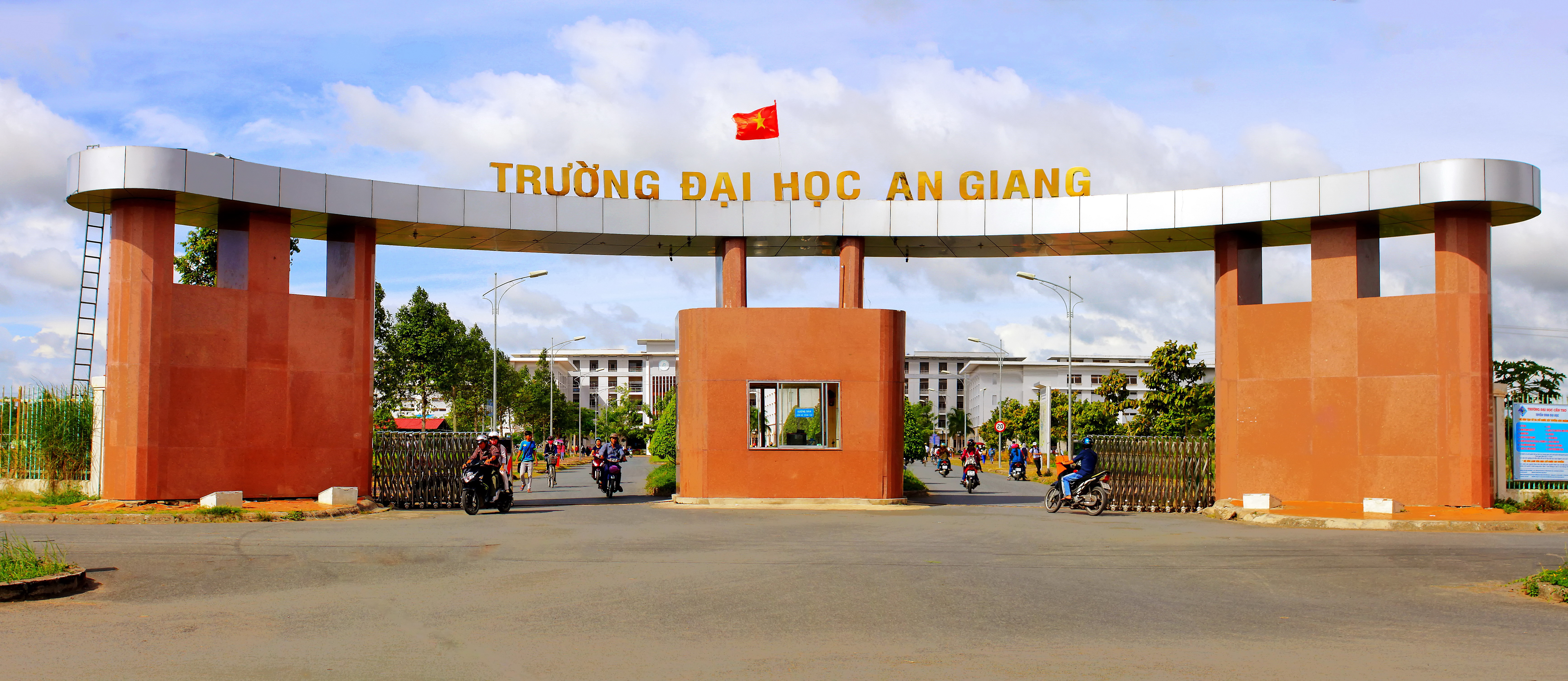
- Type: Public university
- Established: 1999; 27 years ago
- Parent institution: Vietnam National University, Ho Chi Minh City
- Rector: Võ Văn Thắng
- Administrative staff: 815
- Undergraduates: 10,003
- Location: 18 Ung Văn Khiêm, phường Đông Xuyên, Long Xuyên, An Giang, Vietnam
- Campus: Rural 123 acres (0.50 km^{2})
- Colors: green, yellow, and white
- Website: www.agu.edu.vn

VNU-HCM An Giang University (AGU; Vietnamese: Trường Đại học An Giang, Đại học Quốc gia Thành phố Hồ Chí Minh) is a Vietnamese public university based in the city of Long Xuyên in An Giang Province. With over 10,000 enrolled students annually, it is one of the major educational and research institutions in the Mekong Delta region of Vietnam.

== History ==
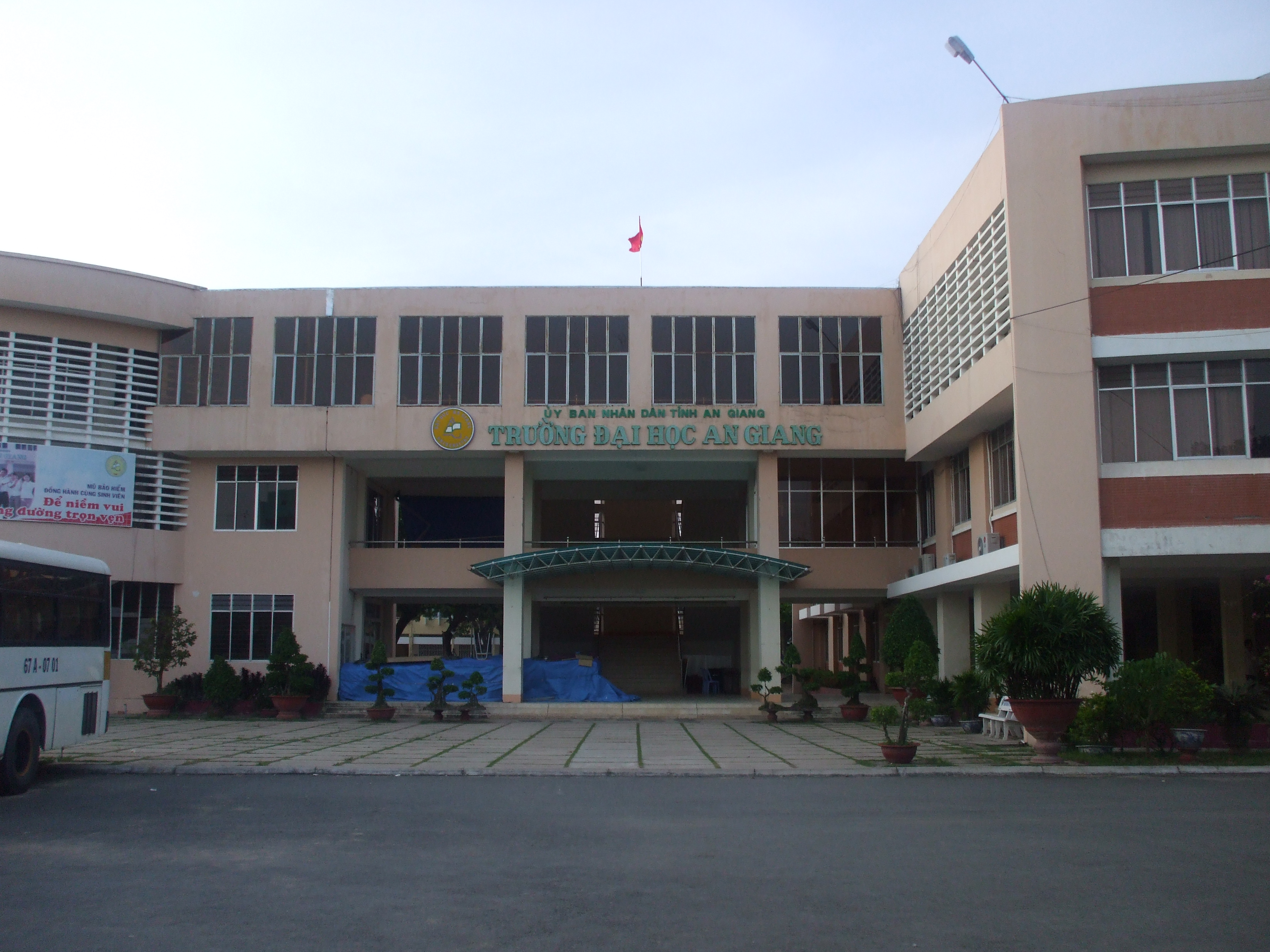
Front of the original campus

In 1975, the school opened as a Teacher Training College. In 1999, it was re-established as the second university in the then-rural Mekong Delta region of Vietnam, with the purpose of serving the provinces of An Giang, Kiên Giang, and Đồng Tháp. Agriculturalist Dr. Võ Tòng Xuân was appointed as its first rector. With the rapid expansion of the school, news spread about the possible sale and privatization of the school, with school leadership denying the information as rumors in 2015. In 2019, the university became officially affiliated as a member of the Vietnam National University, Ho Chi Minh City system.

The current rector is Dr. Võ Văn Thắng. AGU has 10,003 students and 815 staff members and lecturers.

== Campus ==
For much of its existence, the university was a single campus near the developing downtown of Long Xuyen. In 2009, the university opened its north campus, which would serve as the school's primary headquarters. Due to its size and central location, the campus sometimes serves as a central meeting ground for the city festivals and expositions.

== Academics ==
AGU has six main schools housing 36 departments and 57 degree programs.

=== Schools ===
AGU has six main schools:

- School of Education
- School of Agriculture and Natural Resources
- School of Technology and Environment
- School of Economics and Business Management
- School of Culture and Arts
- School of Philosophy

=== Institutional Partnerships ===
An Giang University has a number of partnerships both domestic and international, with universities, non-governmental organizations, and corporations.

== Student life ==
The University has on-campus dormitories. There is an electronic newspaper produced by and for the student body. There multiple student organizations and clubs on-campus.

== Notable Alumni and Faculty ==
- Dr. Võ Tòng Xuân
