= Võ Tòng Xuân =

Vietnamese agricultural expert (1940–2024)

Võ Tòng Xuân (6 September 1940 – 19 August 2024) was a Vietnamese agricultural expert who was provost of Tân Tạo University (TTU), rector of An Giang University (AGU) and vice rector of Can Tho University. He was also a member of the Board of Trustees of the Rockefeller Foundation from 2002 until 2010.

He is known throughout southern Vietnam as Dr. Rice because of a popular television show he presented that taught farmers better techniques for growing and cultivating rice. He was also instrumental in the eradication of the brown planthopper bug which throughout the 1970s was destroying paddy rice. Part of the problem in eradicating the bug infestation was limitations in improving farming caused by the type of collectivization imposed on the farmers of southern Vietnam. He also helped to bring about reforms in the early 1980s that can be seen as catalysts to the Doi Moi reforms of 1986.

His activities were a key driver of Vietnam becoming one of the world's largest rice exporters.

Võ died on 19 August 2024, at the age of 83.

== Notable positions within international organizations ==
- Member, Board of Trustees of the Rockefeller Foundation (2002–2010)
- Member, Board of Governors, Asian Institute of Management in Manila (1997–2024)
- Member, Board of Trustees of the International Potato Center at Lima, Peru (1996–1999; 2016–2024).
- Research fellow and trustee of the International Rice Research Institute.
- Member, Board of Directors of the International Fertilizer Development Center (2007–2017)

== Notable international awards ==
- Recipient of the Ramon Magsaysay Award for International Understanding in 1993.
- Canada's Certificate of recognition for his "Dedication and contribution to the world of sciences"
- France's "Chevalier de l'Ordre du Merite Agricole Medal"
- Japan's Nikkei Asia Prize for Regional Growth
- Philippines's D.L. Umali Award
- Australia's 2005 ASTD Derek Tribe Award. He was a Fellow of the Australian Academy of Science and Technology.
- VinFuture Prize 2023
