= Hà Tiên =

Ward in An Giang province, Vietnam

- Ward
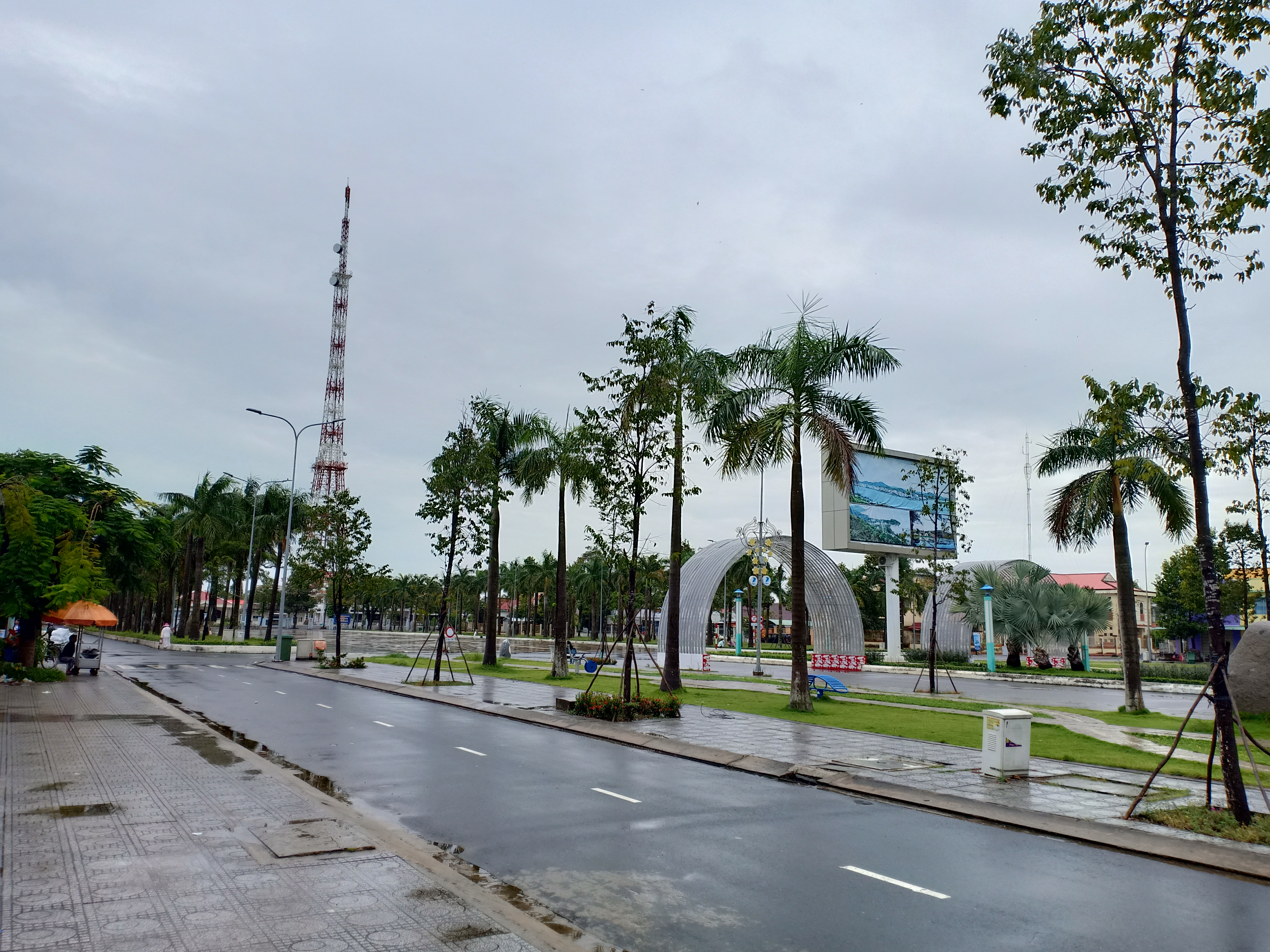
- Chiêu Anh Các Square
- Nickname: Phường Thơ
- Interactive map of Hà Tiên
- Coordinates: 10.385789°N 104.489751°E
- Country: Vietnam
- Region: Mekong Delta
- Province: An Giang
- Established: June 16, 2025
- People's Committee headquarters: 02 Mạc Tử Hoàng

Government
  - Type: Ward
  - Body: People's Council of Hà Tiên ward

Area
  - Total: 61.36 km^{2} (23.69 sq mi)

Population (2025)
  - Total: 40,609
  - Density: 661.8/km^{2} (1,714/sq mi)
- Postal code: 91513
- Area code: 30769
- Website: hatien.angiang.gov.vn

Hà Tiên is a ward of An Giang province, Vietnam. This is one of 102 communes and wards in the province after the 2025 reorganization.

== Geography ==
Hà Tiên is a ward in An Giang province, Vietnam. Located 80km northwest of Rạch Giá ward, 100km west of Long Xuyên ward, 75km southwest of Châu Đốc ward and 60km east of Phú Quốc special zone. It borders with Cambodia to the north, Gulf of Thailand to the west, Tô Châu ward to the south and Giang Thành commune to the east.

== History ==
On 12 June 2025, the National Assembly of Vietnam issued Resolution No. 202/2025/QH15 on the reorganization of provincial-level administrative units. An Giang province was established by merging the entire area and population of Kiên Giang province and An Giang province.

On June 16, 2025, the National Assembly of Vietnam issued Resolution No. 203/2025/QH15 amending and supplementing several articles of the Constitution of the Socialist Republic of Vietnam. Under the resolution, district-level administrative units ceased to operate nationwide from 1 July 2025.

On June 16, 2025, the Standing Committee of the National Assembly issued Resolution No. 1654/NQ-UBTVQH15 on the reorganization of commune-level administrative units of An Giang province in 2025. Ha Tien Ward was established by merging the entire area and population of Bình San, Đông Hồ, Mỹ Đức and Pháo Đài wards (formerly part of Hà Tiên provincial city).

Hà Tiên ward has a natural area of 61.35 km² and a population of 40,609.
