= Mỹ Thới =

- Ward
- Interactive map of Mỹ Thới
- Country: Vietnam
- Province: An Giang
- Time zone: UTC+07:00 (Indochina Time)
- Climate: Aw

Mỹ Thới is a ward (phường) of An Giang Province, Vietnam.
