= Mỹ Hòa Hưng =

- Rural commune
- Interactive map of Mỹ Hòa Hưng
- Country: Vietnam
- Province: An Giang
- Time zone: UTC+07:00 (Indochina Time)
- Climate: Aw

Mỹ Hòa Hưng is a rural commune (xã) of An Giang Province, Vietnam.
