= Bình Đức, An Giang =

Bình Đức
- Ward
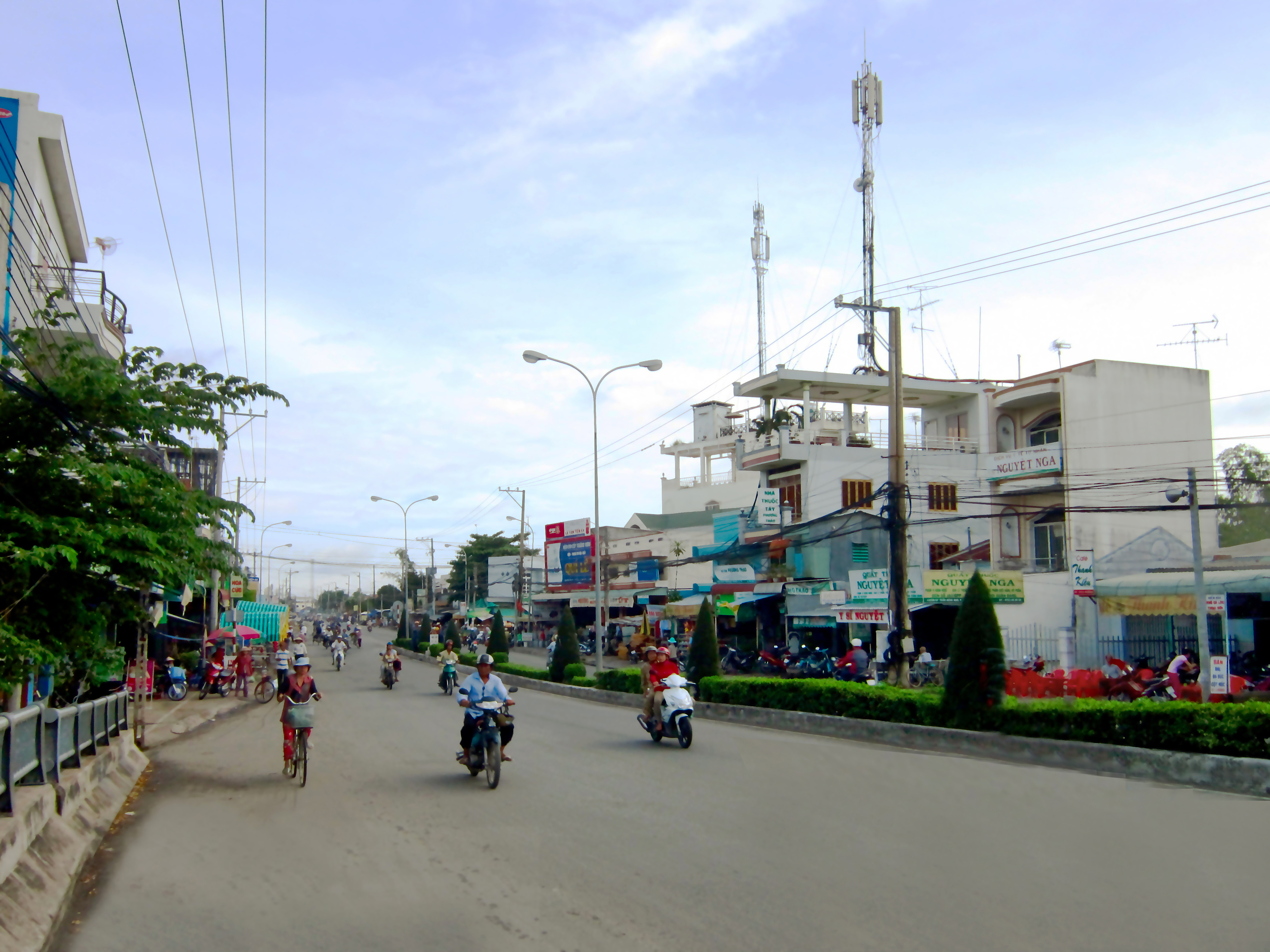
- National Highway 91, the section passing through Trà Ôn market in Bình Đức ward
- Interactive map of Bình Đức
- Country: Vietnam
- Province: An Giang
- Time zone: UTC+07:00 (Indochina Time)
- Climate: Aw

Bình Đức is a ward (phường) of An Giang Province, Vietnam.
