= Búng Bình Thiên =

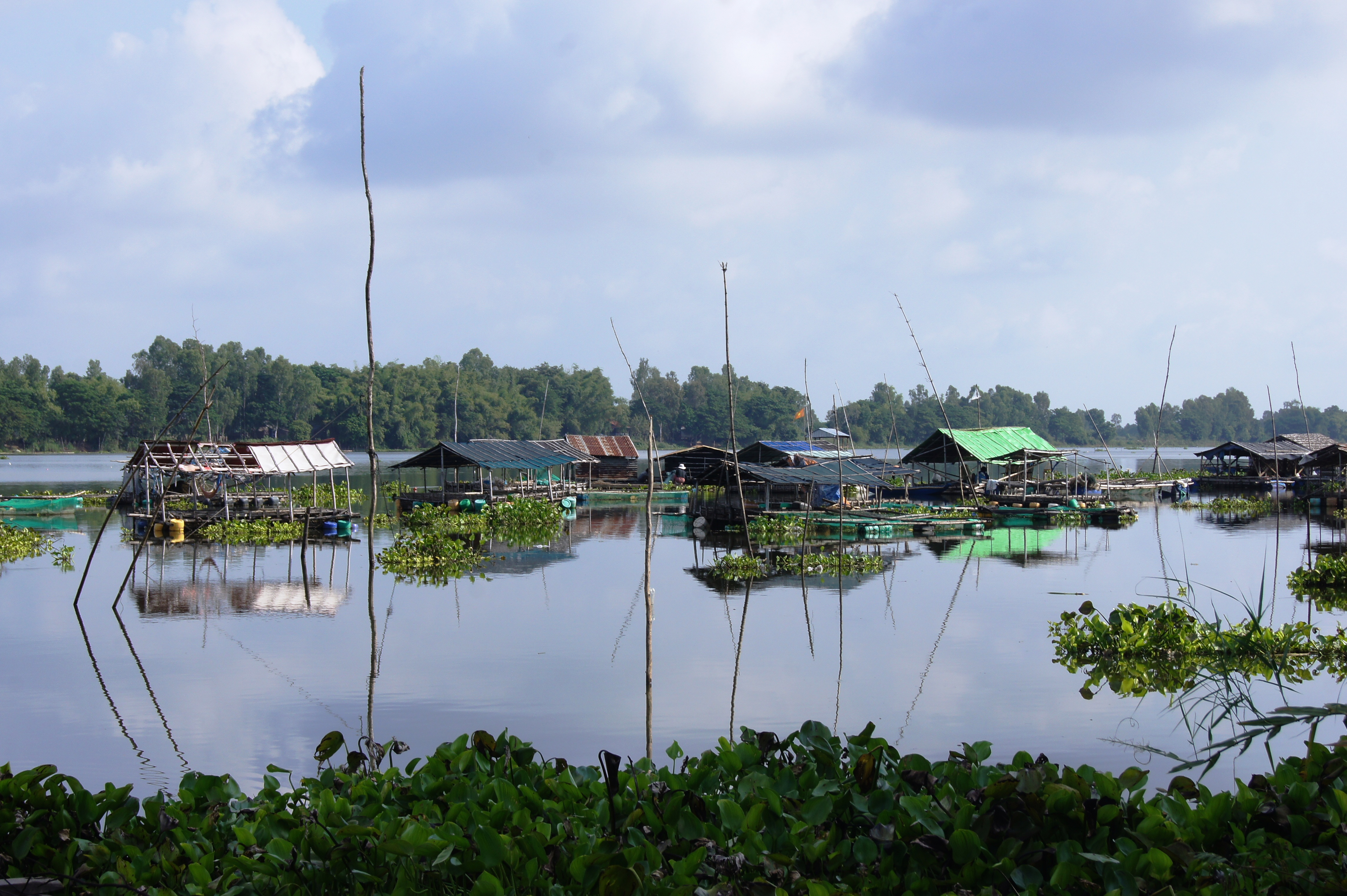
- Búng Bình Thiên.

- Location within Vietnam
- Location: An Phú District, An Giang Province, Vietnam
- Coordinates: 10°55′N 105°04′E
- Type: Lake

Búng Bình Thiên or Nước Trời Lake is a fresh water lake in the Mekong Delta in Vietnam. The name that the lake is most often called by, Búng Bình Thiên, means '[the] lake from the sky', referring to the observed stillness of the lake's surface and blue color it retains year-round. It is located in the An Giang province, about 35 kilometres (22 mi) from the province's capital Chau Doc within the An Phú District. Búng Bình Thiên links three communes, namely Khánh Bình, Nhơn Hội, and Quốc Thái. It also links the Bình Di River and the Hậu River.

== Description ==
The lake's water surface area is 200 hectares, while its depth is 4 metres (4.4 yd) in dry seasons. During rainy seasons, the influx of water from the Mekong River causes the surface area to expand to 800 hectares with the depth rising up to 8 metres (8.7 yd).

The lake is still year-round. Large amounts of algae, kelp, and aquatic plants such as water hyacinth, lotus, and water lily contribute to, and maintain clarity of the water of Búng Bình Thiên in times of Mekong Delta floods via filtering silt, oxygenating water, and roots preventing agitation of the lakebed.

== Legendary history ==
In the 18th century, a Tây Sơn dynasty general chose the place where the lake now sits to train soldiers and store food; at the time, the area was dry and barren, and so a ritual was held to ask the gods for rain and a source of water. Legend tells that after this ritual was held, the general thrust his sword into the ground, creating a wellspring from which the lake appeared.

This legend holds a similarity to the legend of Gia Long Well in Phú Quốc, in which the well was created by Gia Long's sword piercing into the earth to find water.

== Cham people ==
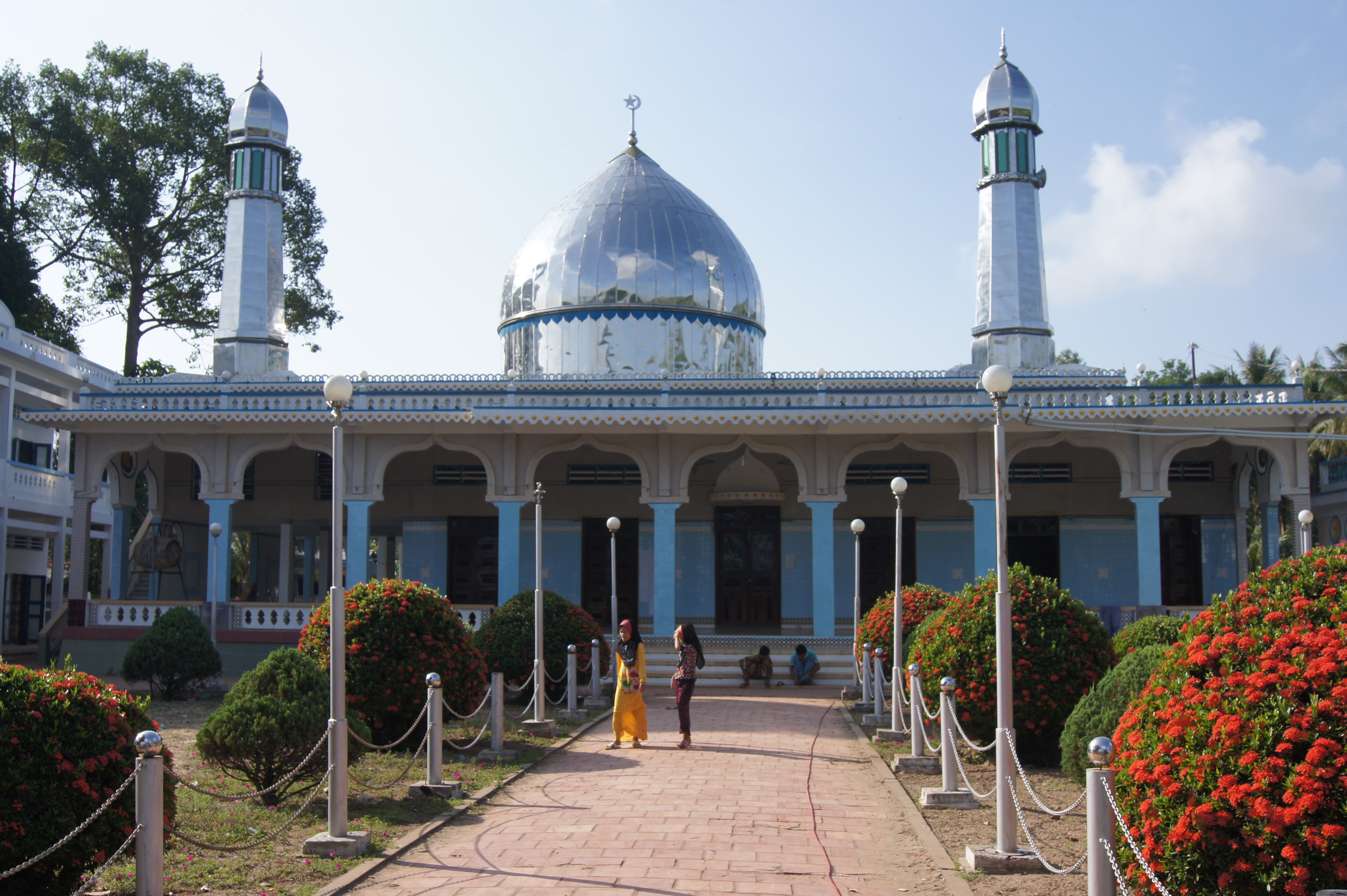
Chams MasJid Khoy Ri Yah in the Nhơn Hội village

The area around Búng Bình Thiên is home to ethnic Cham people who live around the lake and in the villages of Khánh Bình, Nhơn Hội and Quốc Thái.
