= An Phú =

An Phú may refer to several places in Vietnam, including:

- An Phú District, a rural district of An Giang Province
- An Phú, District 2, a ward of District 2, Ho Chi Minh City
- An Phú, Cần Thơ, a ward of Ninh Kiều District
- An Phú, Quảng Nam, a ward of Tam Kỳ
- An Phú, An Khê, a ward of An Khê in Gia Lai Province
- An Phú, Bình Dương, a ward of Thuận An
- An Phú (township), a township and capital of An Phú District
- An Phú, Hanoi, a commune of Mỹ Đức District
- An Phú, Củ Chi, a commune of Củ Chi District in Ho Chi Minh City
- An Phú, Pleiku, a commune of Pleiku in Gia Lai Province
- An Phú, Phú Yên, a commune of Tuy Hòa
- An Phú, Bình Phước, a commune of Hớn Quản District
- An Phú, Yên Bái, a commune of Lục Yên District
- An Phú, Tịnh Biên, a commune of Tịnh Biên District
