= Bình Di River =

River in Vietnam

Coordinates: 10°54′51.1″N 105°2′57.8″E

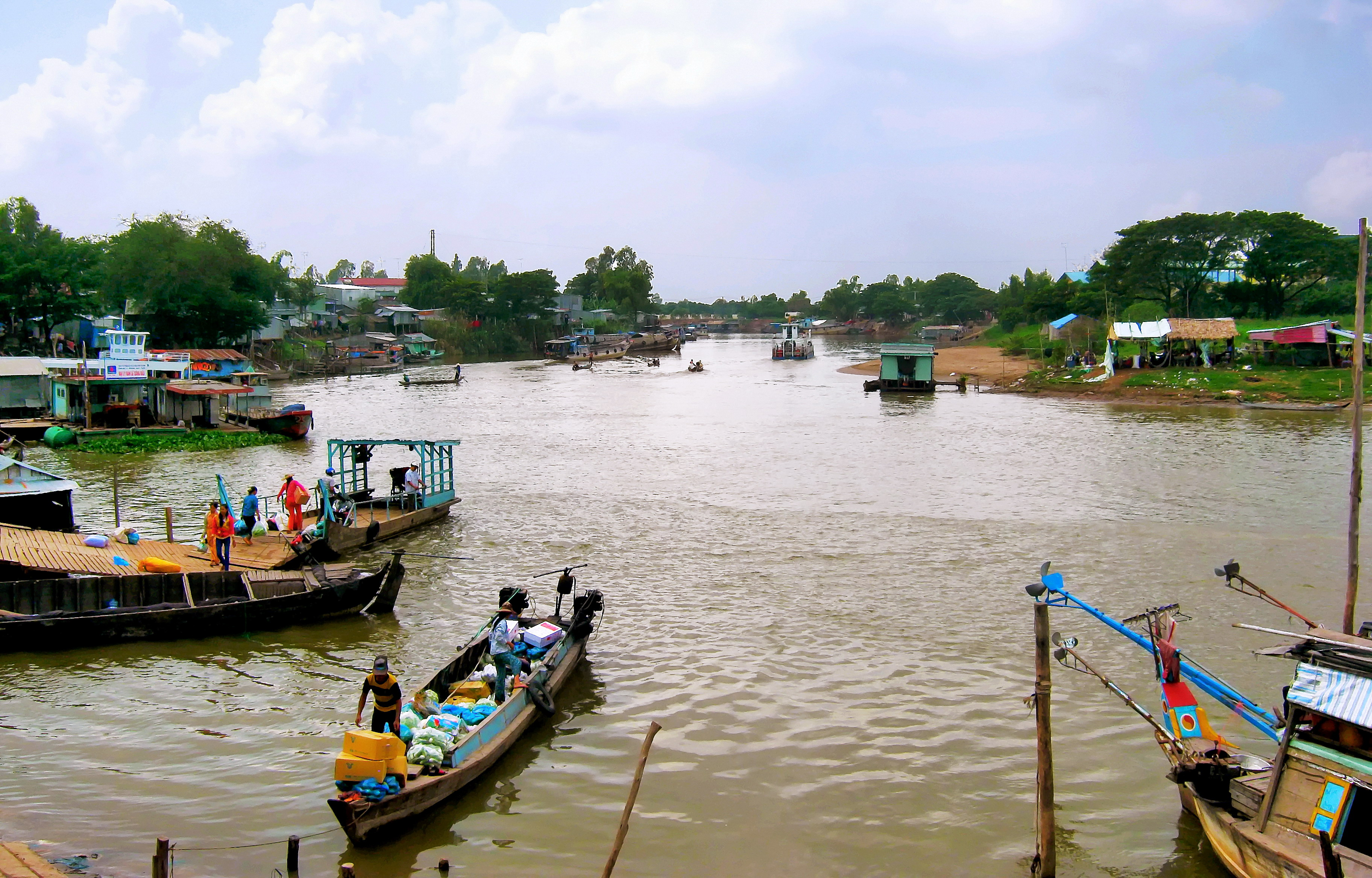
- Bình Di River, section flowing through Long Bình market, An Phú district
- Native name: Sông Bình Di

Location
- Country: Vietnam

Physical characteristics
- Source: Hậu (Bassac) River
  - location: Takéo province & Kandal province, Cambodia
- Mouth: Châu Đốc River
  - location: Khánh Bình, An Phú district, An Giang province, Vietnam
- Length: 33 km (21 mi)

The Bình Di River (Vietnamese: Sông Bình Di) is distributary of the river Hậu and runs between Cambodia and Vietnam. It flows through An Giang Province. The river is often used by illegal immigrants to enter Vietnam.
