= Phước Hưng =

Phước Hưng may refer to several commune-level subdivisions in Vietnam, including:

- Phước Hưng, Bà Rịa, a ward of Bà Rịa in Bà Rịa-Vũng Tàu Province
- Phước Hưng, An Giang, a commune of An Phú District
- Phước Hưng, Long Điền, a commune of Long Điền District in Bà Rịa-Vũng Tàu Province
- Phước Hưng, Trà Vinh, a commune of Trà Cú District
- Phước Hưng, Bình Định, a commune of Tuy Phước District
