= Vĩnh Trường =

Vĩnh Trường may refer to several places in Vietnam, including:

- Vĩnh Trường, Khánh Hòa, a commune of Nha Trang
- Vĩnh Trường, An Giang, a commune of An Phú District
- Vĩnh Trường, Quảng Trị, a commune of Gio Linh District
