= Châu Đốc River =

River in Vietnam

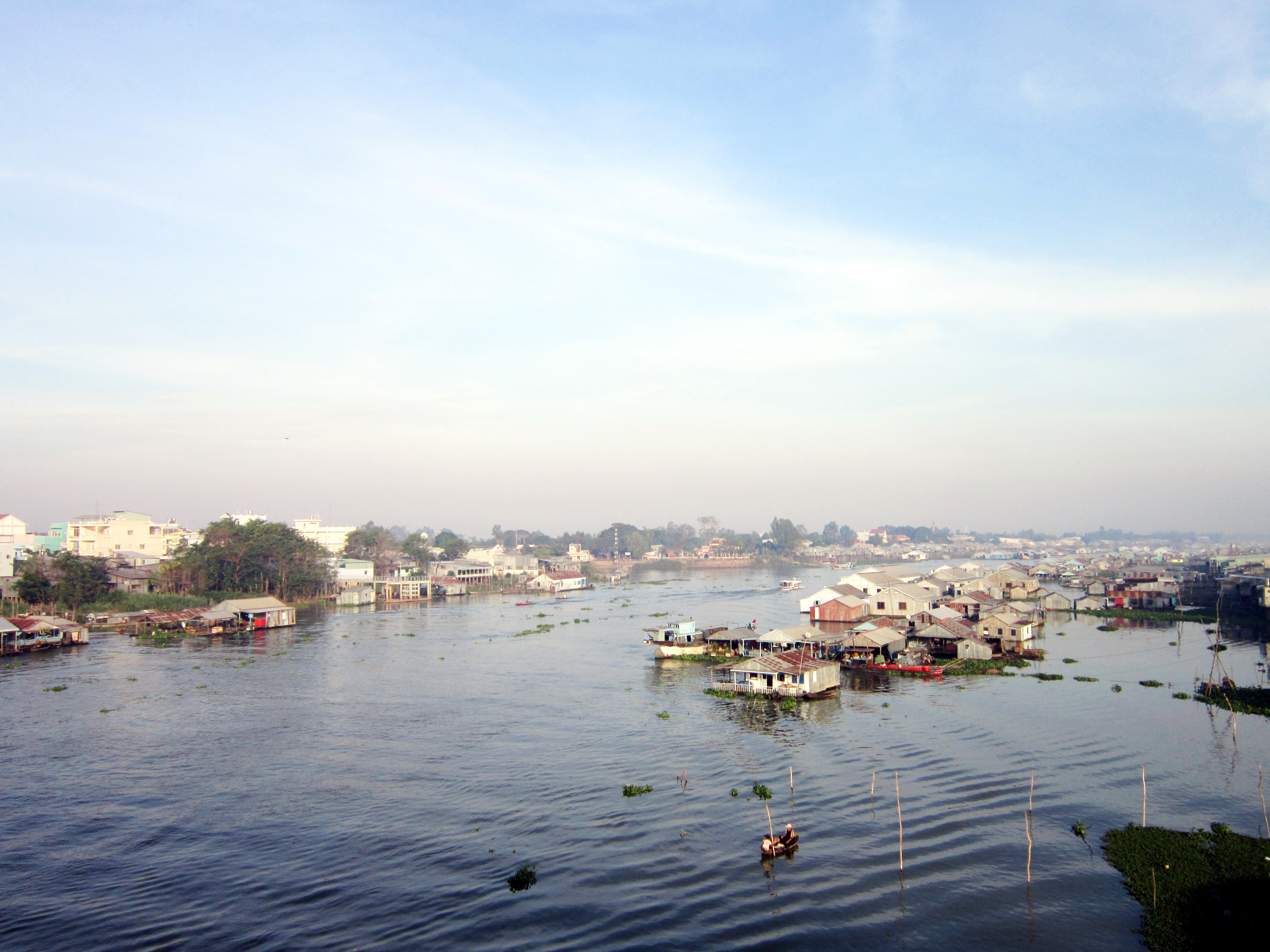
- Châu Đốc River (An Giang, Vietnam), the section flowing through the Cồn Tiên bridge.
- Native name: Sông Châu Đốc

Location
- Country: Vietnam; Cambodia

Physical characteristics
- Source
  - location: Takéo province, Cambodia
- Mouth: Hậu (Bassac) River
  - location: Đa Phước, An Phú district, An Giang province, Vietnam
- Length: 15 km (9.3 mi)

The Châu Đốc River (Vietnamese: Sông Châu Đốc) is a river of Vietnam and Cambodia, also known as the Hậu River..

From its source in Takéo Province in Cambodia, the river drains southerly, crossing into Vietnam's An Giang Province then joining the Bassac River at Châu Đốc.

The Hậu River, one of the two main branches of the Mekong River system, flows through several key provinces in the Mekong Delta region of Vietnam, passing through the city of Châu Đốc in An Giang Province. In Châu Đốc, the Hậu River plays an essential role in the local economy and culture, serving as a primary waterway connecting various regions.
