= Đa Phước =

Đa Phước may refer to several rural communes in Vietnam, including:

- Đa Phước, Ho Chi Minh City, a commune of Bình Chánh District
- Đa Phước, An Giang, a commune of An Phú District

== See also ==
- Đa Phúc
