= Phú Hữu =

Phú Hữu may refer to the following places in Vietnam:

- Phú Hữu, An Giang, a commune of An Phú District
- Phú Hữu, District 9, a ward of District 9, Ho Chi Minh City
- Phú Hữu, Hậu Giang, a commune of Châu Thành District, Hậu Giang Province

== See also ==
- Phú Hựu, a commune of Đồng Tháp province
