= Phú Hội =

Phú Hội may refer to several places in Vietnam:

- Phú Hội, Huế, a ward of Huế
- Phú Hội, An Giang, a commune of An Phú District
- Phú Hội, Đồng Nai, a commune of Nhơn Trạch District
- Phú Hội, Lâm Đồng, a commune of Đức Trọng District
