= Takhmao Bridge =

Bridge in Phnom Penh, Cambodia

Coordinates: 11.4686°N 104.9602°E

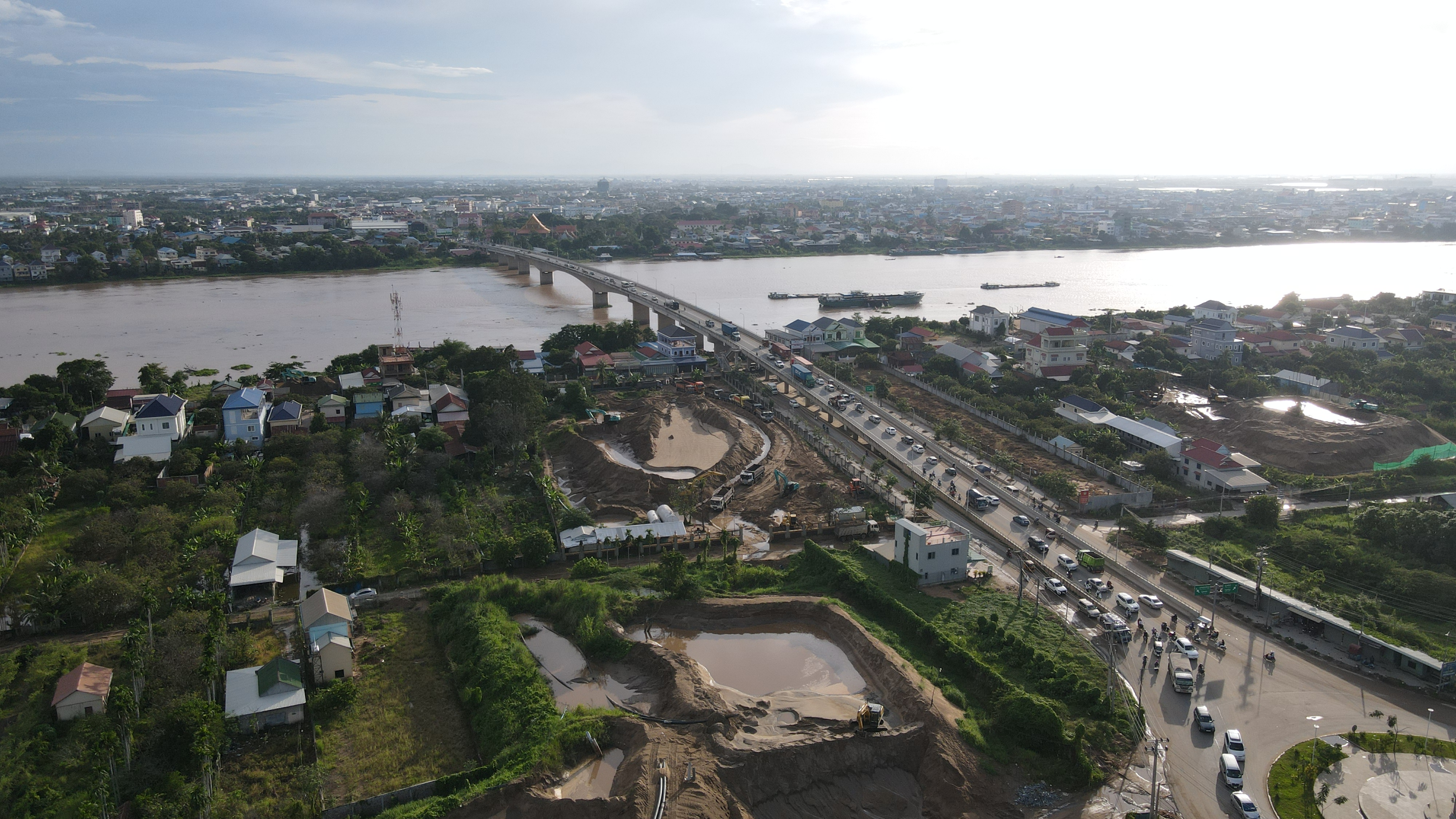
Takhmao Bridge

The Cambodia-China Friendship Takhmao Bridge is an 855 m bridge that crosses the Bassac River in Phnom Penh. Funded from China, the Ta Khmao Bridge was constructed between January 1, 2012 and June 30, 2015. It was inaugurated on August 2, 2015.

The two-lane bridge connects National Road 1 and National Road 2.
