= Quốc Thái =

- Rural commune and village
- Location in Vietnam
- Coordinates: 10°53′36″N 105°4′50″E
- Country: Vietnam
- Province: An Giang
- District: An Phú
- Time zone: UTC+07:00 (Indochina Time)

Quốc Thái is a rural commune (xã) and village of the An Phú District of An Giang Province, Vietnam. It is located north by road from Châu Đốc. The main village of Quốc Thái lies along the river bank.
