= Nhơn Hội, An Giang =

Nhơn Hội
- Rural commune and village
- Location in Vietnam
- Coordinates: 10°54′46″N 105°2′53″E
- Country: Vietnam
- Province: An Giang
- Time zone: UTC+07:00 (Indochina Time)

Nhơn Hội is a rural commune (xã) and village of An Giang Province, Vietnam.
