= Bassac River =

River in Cambodia and Vietnam

Coordinates: 9°31′N 106°13′E

Bassac River Hậu River Tonlé Bassac
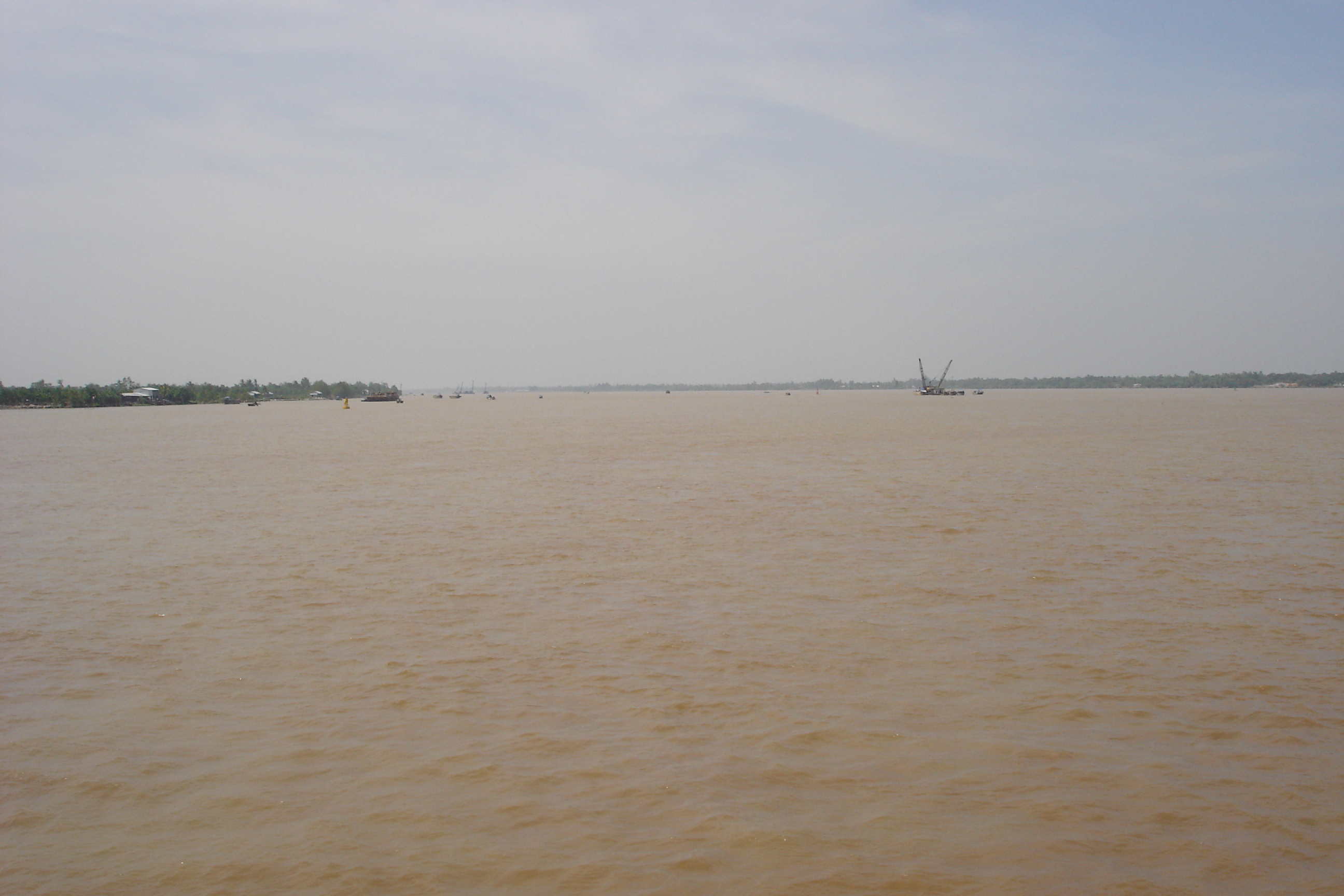
- The wide Hậu River near Cần Thơ in the heart of the Mekong Delta
- Native name: ទន្លេបាសាក់ (Khmer); Sông Hậu (Vietnamese); 瀧後 (Vietnamese)

Location
- Country: Cambodia, Vietnam
- City: Phnom Penh

Physical characteristics
- Source: Mekong River
  - location: Phnom Penh
- Mouth
  - location: South China Sea, Sóc Trăng Province
  - elevation: 0 m (0 ft)
- Length: 190 km (120 mi)
- Discharge
  - location: Phnom Penh

Basin features
- Tributaries
  - right: Bình Di River

The Bassac River (Khmer: ទន្លេបាសាក់; Tonlé Bassac) or Hậu River (Vietnamese: Sông Hậu 瀧後 or Hậu Giang 後江) is a distributary of the Tonlé Sap and Mekong River. The river starts in Phnom Penh, Cambodia, and flows southerly, crossing the border into Vietnam near Châu Đốc.

== Description ==
The name Bassac comes from the Khmer prefix pa ("father" or "male") added to sak (សក្តិ) ("power, honor"), a Khmer word borrowed from the Sanskrit sakti (शक्ति).

The Bassac is an important transportation corridor between Cambodia and Vietnam, with barges and other craft plying the waters. A city of the same name was once the west-bank capital of the Kingdom of Champasak. Sak (សក្តិ) can also be seen in the Khmer spelling of Champasak: ចំប៉ាសក្តិ.

USS Satyr (ARL-23), a recommissioned repair ship originally built for the United States Navy during World War II, served on the Bassac River during the Vietnam War. Four bridges span the Bassac: the Monivong and Takhmao bridges in Phnom Penh, Cambodia and the Chau Doc Bridge and Cần Thơ Bridge in Cần Thơ in Vietnam.

Approximately 8.5 kilometers to Prey Basak lies a ruined ancient temple called Prasat Prey Basak Temple, which was destroyed during the Vietnam War due to heavy bombing by the United States. Prasat Prey Basak Temple was built by the Funan Kingdom during the 2nd and 3rd centuries. The temple is dated between 1,900 and 2,000 years old. It is considered to be the oldest prasat in Cambodia.

== Gallery ==
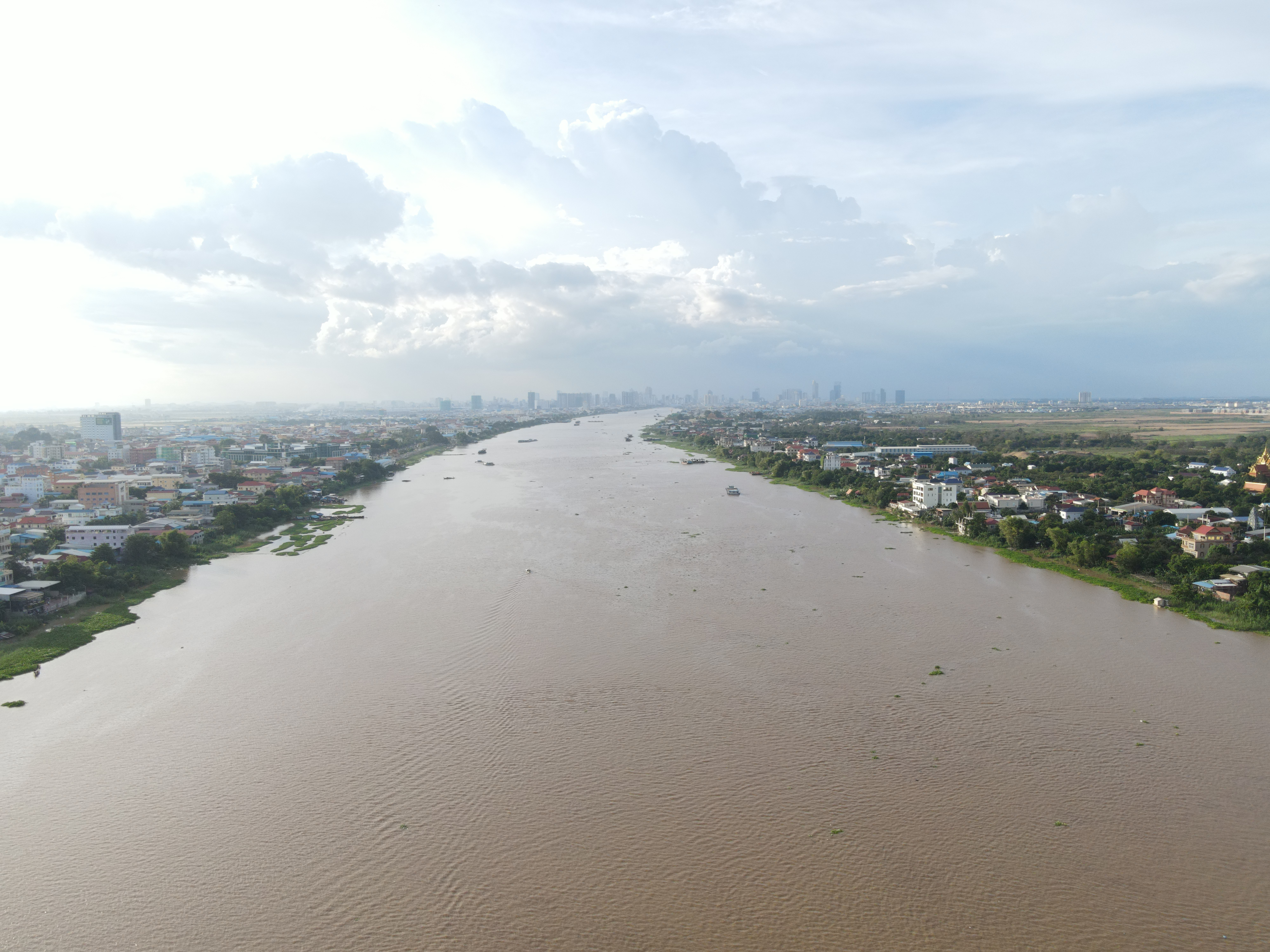
Aerial view at Takhmao

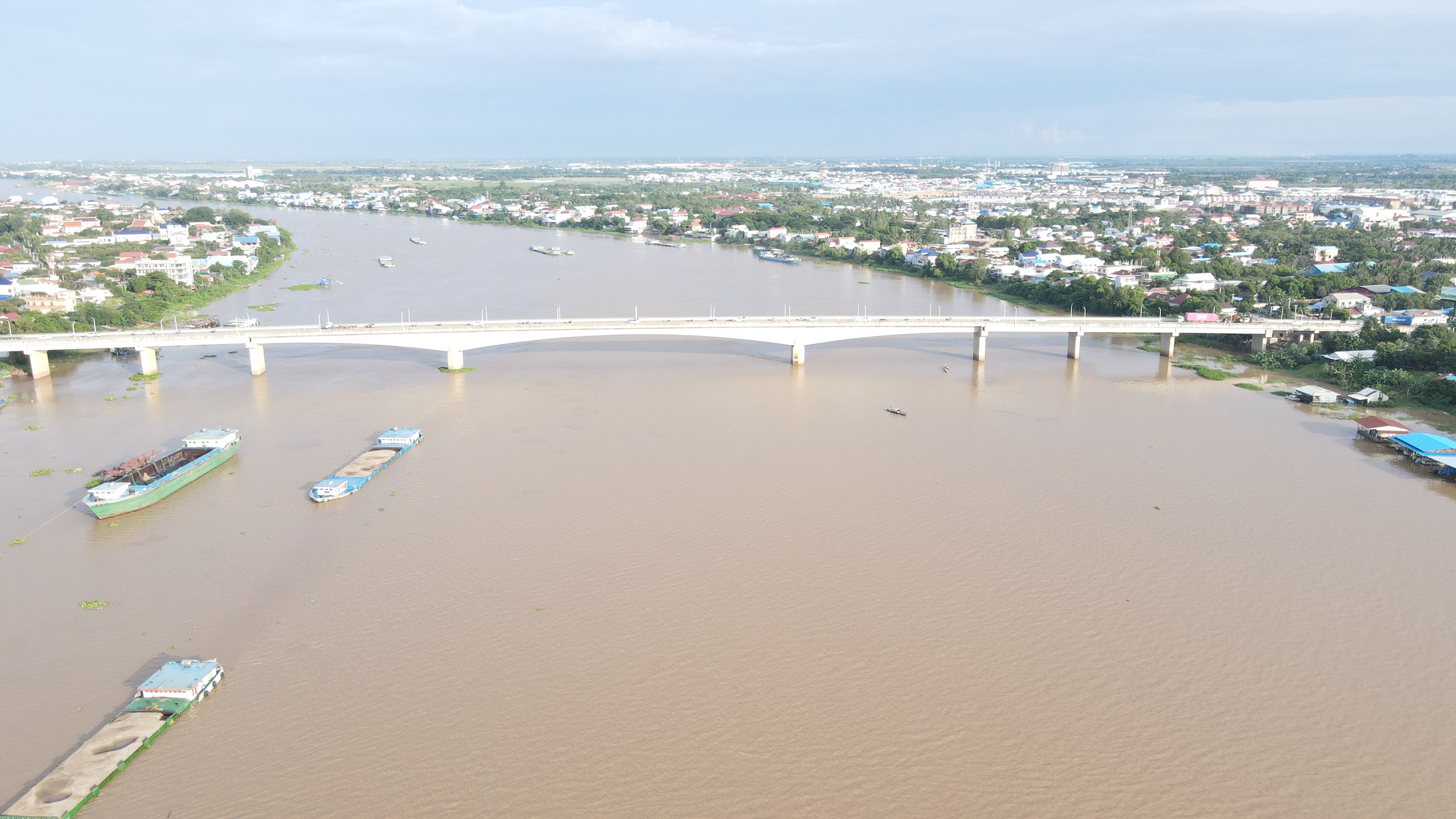
Aerial view of Takhmao Bridge at Takhmao

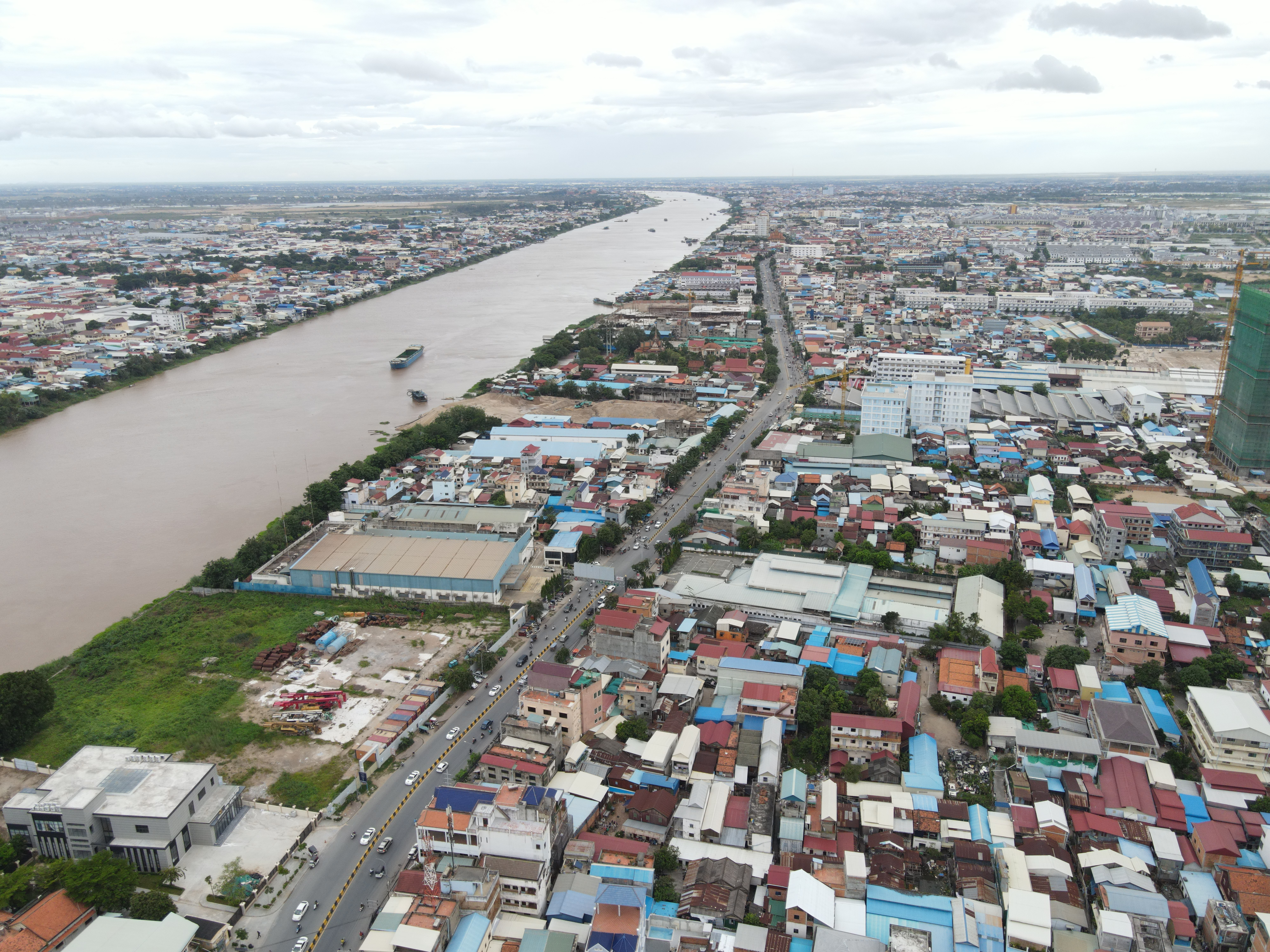
National Highway 2 seen from Kbal Thnol, Chak Angre

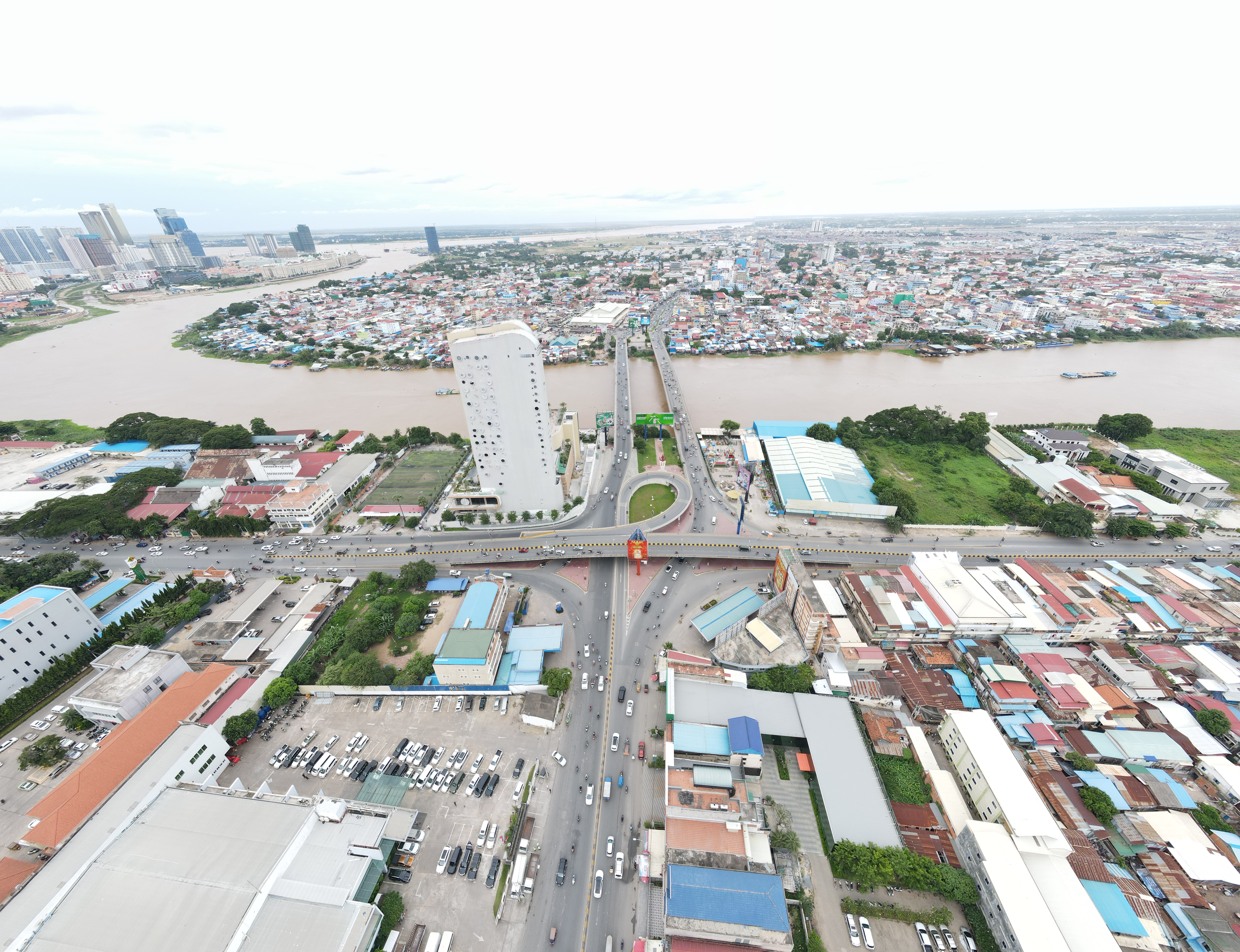
Aerial view at Monivong Boulevard, Chbar Ampov

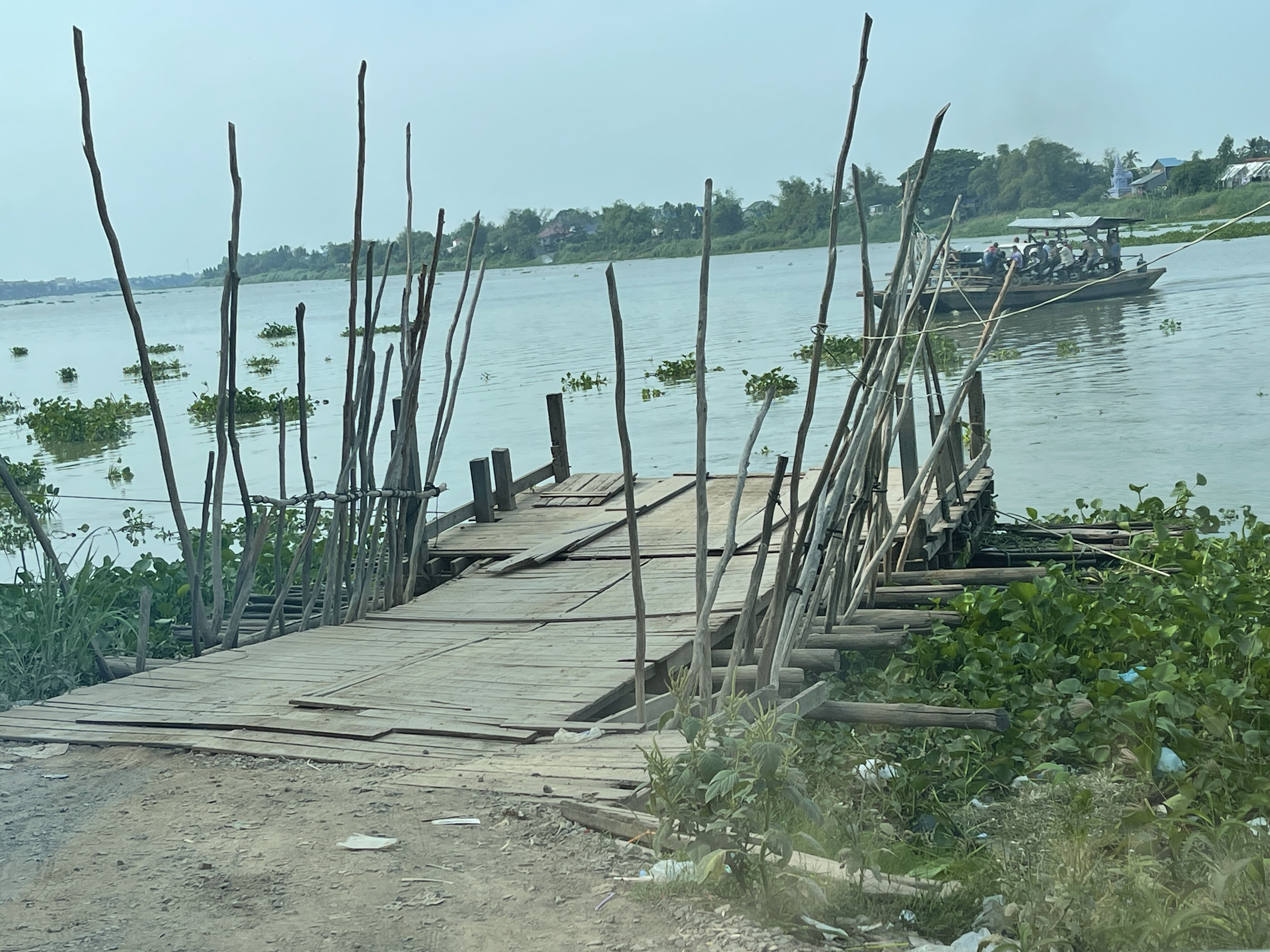
Svay Tany Ferry Dock at S'ang District, Kandal Province
