= An Phú district =

An Phú district Huyện An Phú
- District
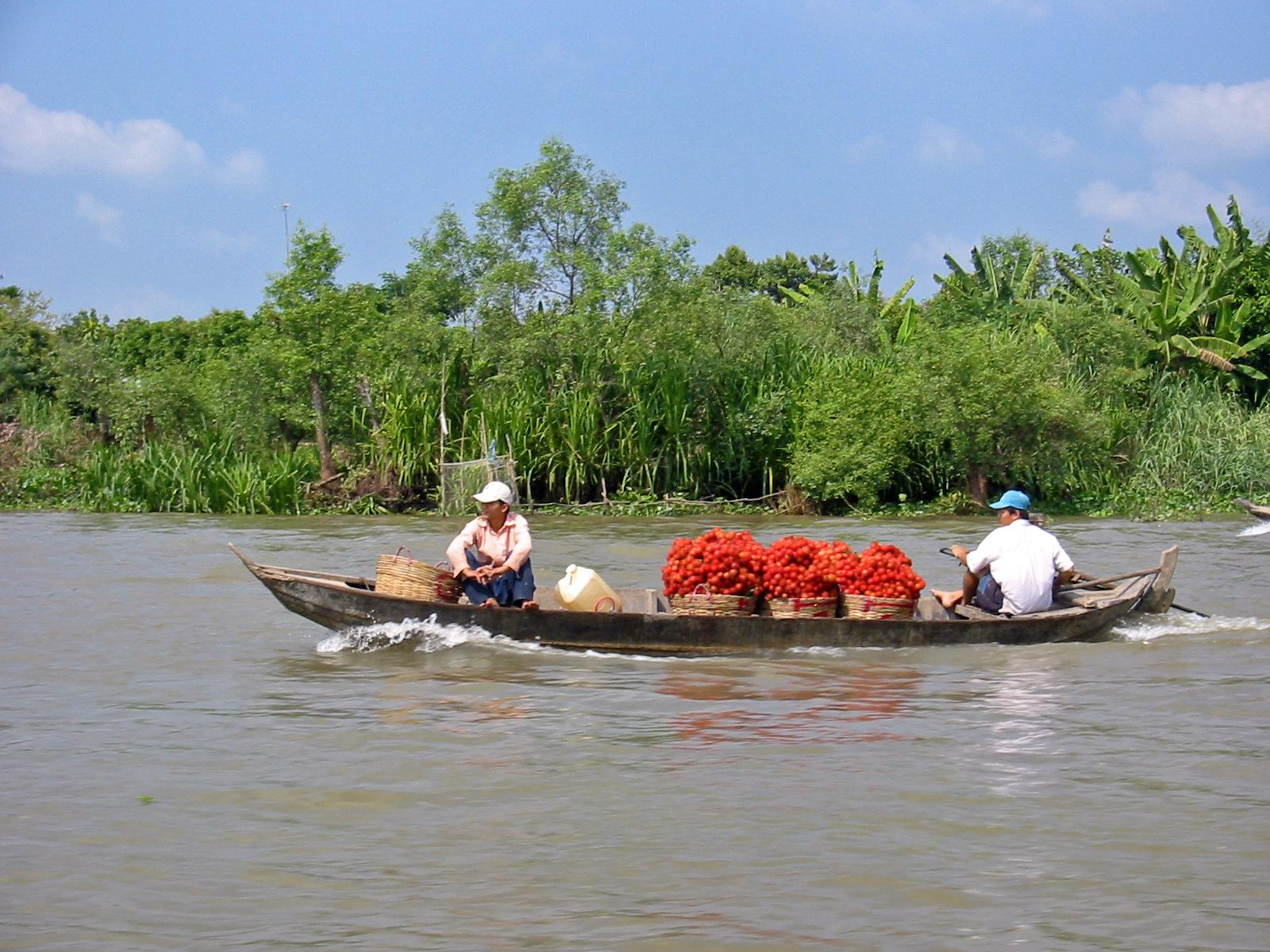
- The district is connected to the Mekong via the Hậu River. The district along the river served as a stop-off point for traders on the way to Phnom Penh.

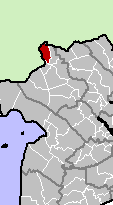
- Location in An Giang province
- Coordinates: 10°55′N 105°4′E
- Country: Vietnam
- Province: An Giang
- Established: 6 August 1957
- Disestablishment: June 16th 2025
- Capital: An Phú

Area
  - District: 87 sq mi (226 km^{2})

Population (2019 census)
  - District: 148,615
  - Density: 1,700/sq mi (658/km^{2})
  - Urban: 19,263
- Time zone: UTC+07:00 (Indochina Time)

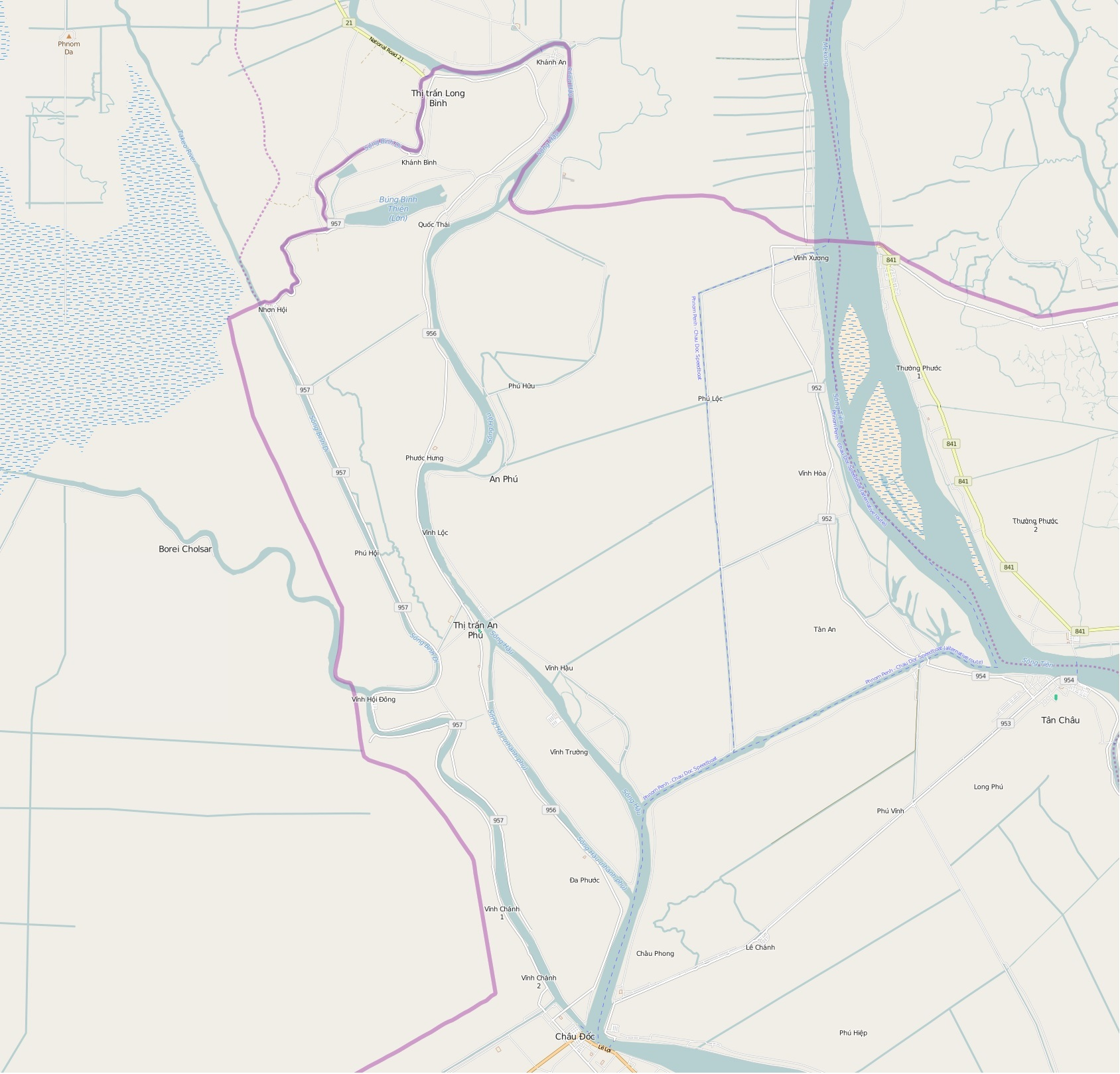
An Phú district map.

An Phú was a district of An Giang province in the Mekong Delta region of Vietnam and shares the international border with Cambodia. An Phú juts out at the western edge of Vietnam into Cambodia. As of 2019, the district had a population of 148,615. The district covers an area of 226 km^{2}. The district capital lies at An Phú town.

== History ==
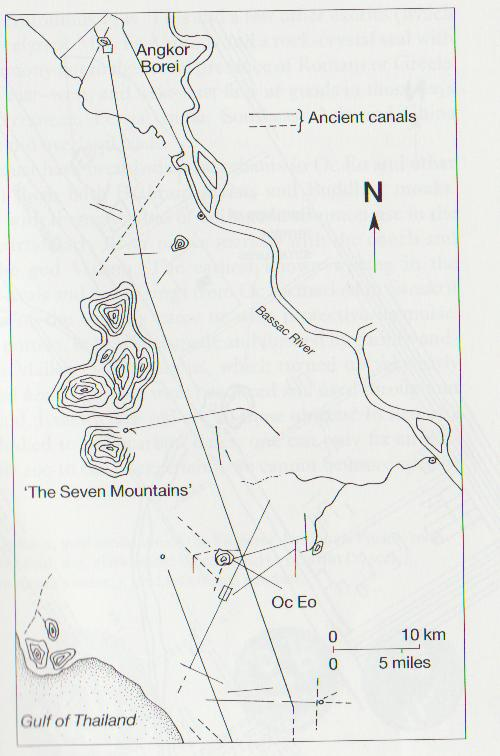
Map of Óc Eo and Angkor Borei. An Phú on the route.

The district is one of the most remote places in Vietnam. An Phú was a part of the Tầm Phong Long region that had links with former Funan kingdom and was given to the Nguyễn lords in 1757 by Chenla king Outey II.

Due to favourable conditions for agriculture and water transportation, the Vietnamese settled in the area. The region was crucial for trade, business, and military strategy.

In May 1833, during the Siamese-Vietnamese war, the Siamese soldiers crossed the district on the river to attack the Dai Nam. In 1841, many Chams people in Cambodia went to the district to avoid the war in Cambodia.

In Daniel Marvin's book Expendable Elite – One Soldier's Journey into Covert Warfare, he talked about the time he worked there in the Special Forces in 1965–1966. They set up camp in Dan Nam in An Phú town and enlisted a group of militant Hòa Hảo forces to support them. He said: "An Phú is the safest place [in] all [of] Vietnam".

There was a military invasion from 1977 to 1978 by Pol Pot and the Khmer Rouge army. Almost all of the people in An Phú had to be evacuated (mainly to the Chợ Mới and Phú Tân districts). The resultant damage was non-significant.

On June 16, 2025, the Standing Committee of the National Assembly issued Resolution No. 1685/NQ-UBTVQH15. The district was dissolved and new wards were rearranged from the district.

== Administrative divisions ==
The district is divided into two urban municipalities, An Phú and Long Bình, and 12 rural communes. These are:

- Khánh An
- Phú Hữu
- Vĩnh Lộc
- Vĩnh Hậu
- Nhơn Hội
- Phú Hội
- Vĩnh Hội Đông
- Khánh Bình
- Quốc Thái
- Phước Hưng
- Đa Phước
- Vĩnh Trường

Before 1975, An Phú was part of Long Châu Tiền, but An Phú District separated following the 1975 merger with Tân Châu district of Phú Châu. By 1992, it was fully separated into the An Phú District of today.

== People ==
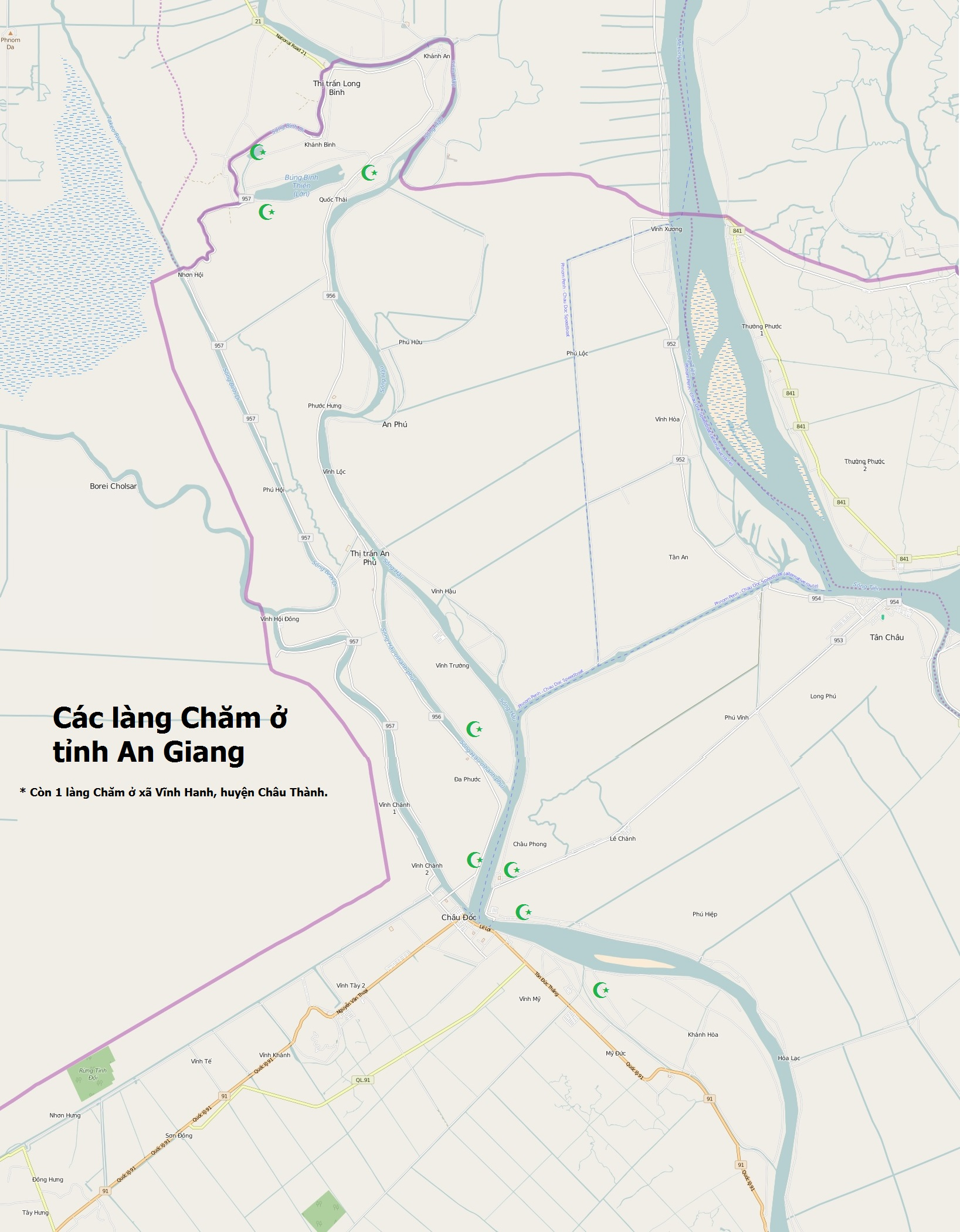
Chams villages in An Giang province (An Phú, Châu Phú, Châu Thành district, Tân Châu town).

Most of the people in An Phú District are ethnic Kinh (Vietnamese).

There are about 12,000 Chams people who mostly live in 5 villages: Đa Phước, Vĩnh Trương, Nhơn Hội, Khánh Bình and Quốc Thái.

== Monsoonal flooding ==
Located near Châu Đốc, An Phú district is famous for its rice and fish during the monsoonal flood season. The floods arrive in the seventh lunar month, roughly in August. The local government organises the Flood Season Festival annually. When the monsoonal season comes, many villages and rice fields are inundated by water. Many houses were built on stilts to protect themselves against flooding. Although produce cannot be grown during this season, the fishing catch is plentiful, and boats are the dominant mode of transport during this season.

== Economy ==
Residents of An Phú District are mainly farmers; most of the area is under rice cultivation with alluvium soil and freshwater, which also allows much fishing. Every year, when all the communes are affected by water, the fields become inundated. On the Cambodian border on the other side, opposite the town of Long Bình is a market area of Cambodia known as Chrey Thum (Koh Thum).

The road from An Phú to the capital, Phnom Penh, is Cambodia's most recent road from Vietnam, which has created good conditions for trade in the region.

== Education ==
All communes and towns have schools from kindergarten to middle school.

== Gallery ==
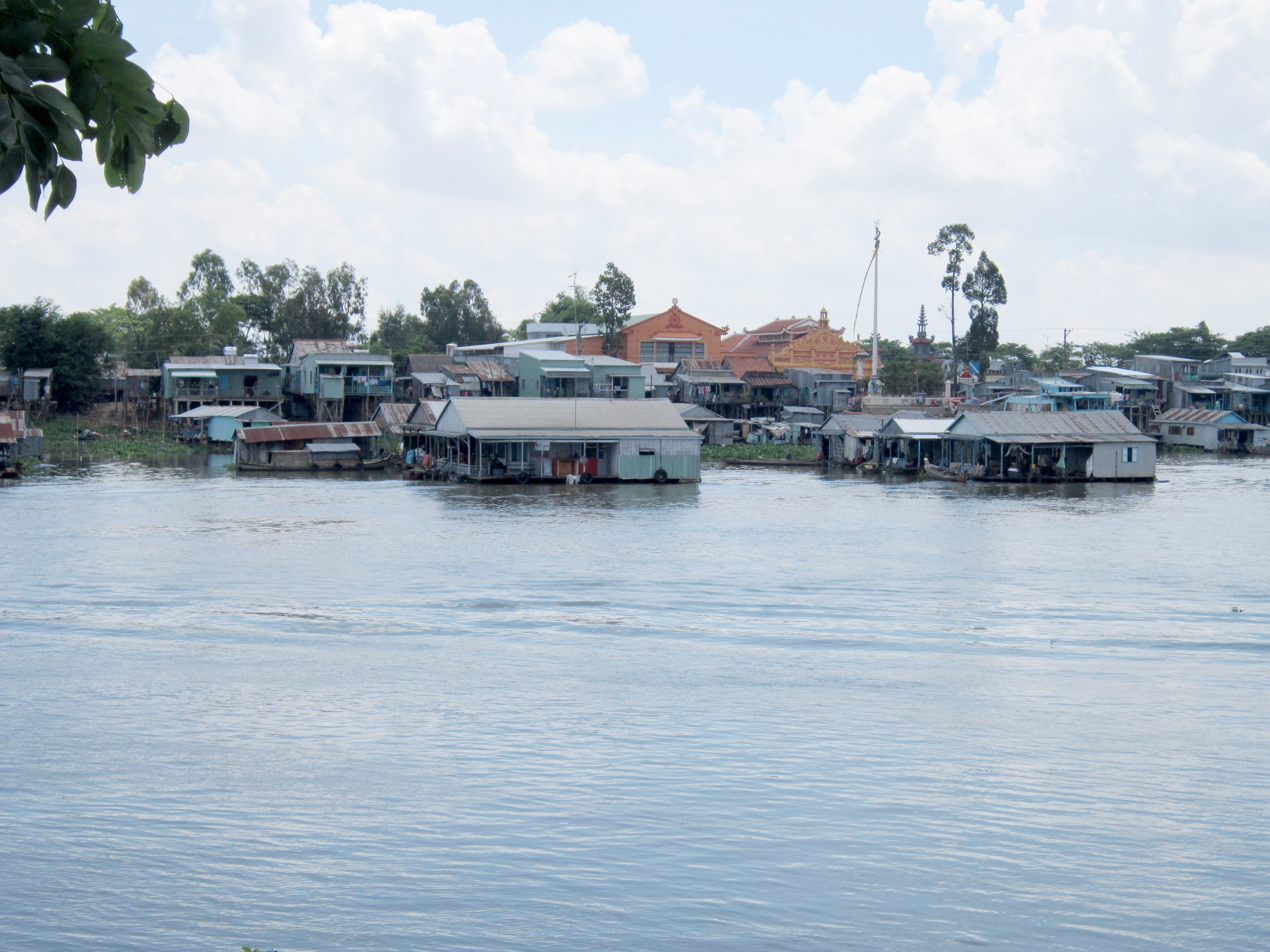
A corner of Da Phuoc, in the area of Da Phuoc pagoda, on Chau Doc River (An Giang, Vietnam).

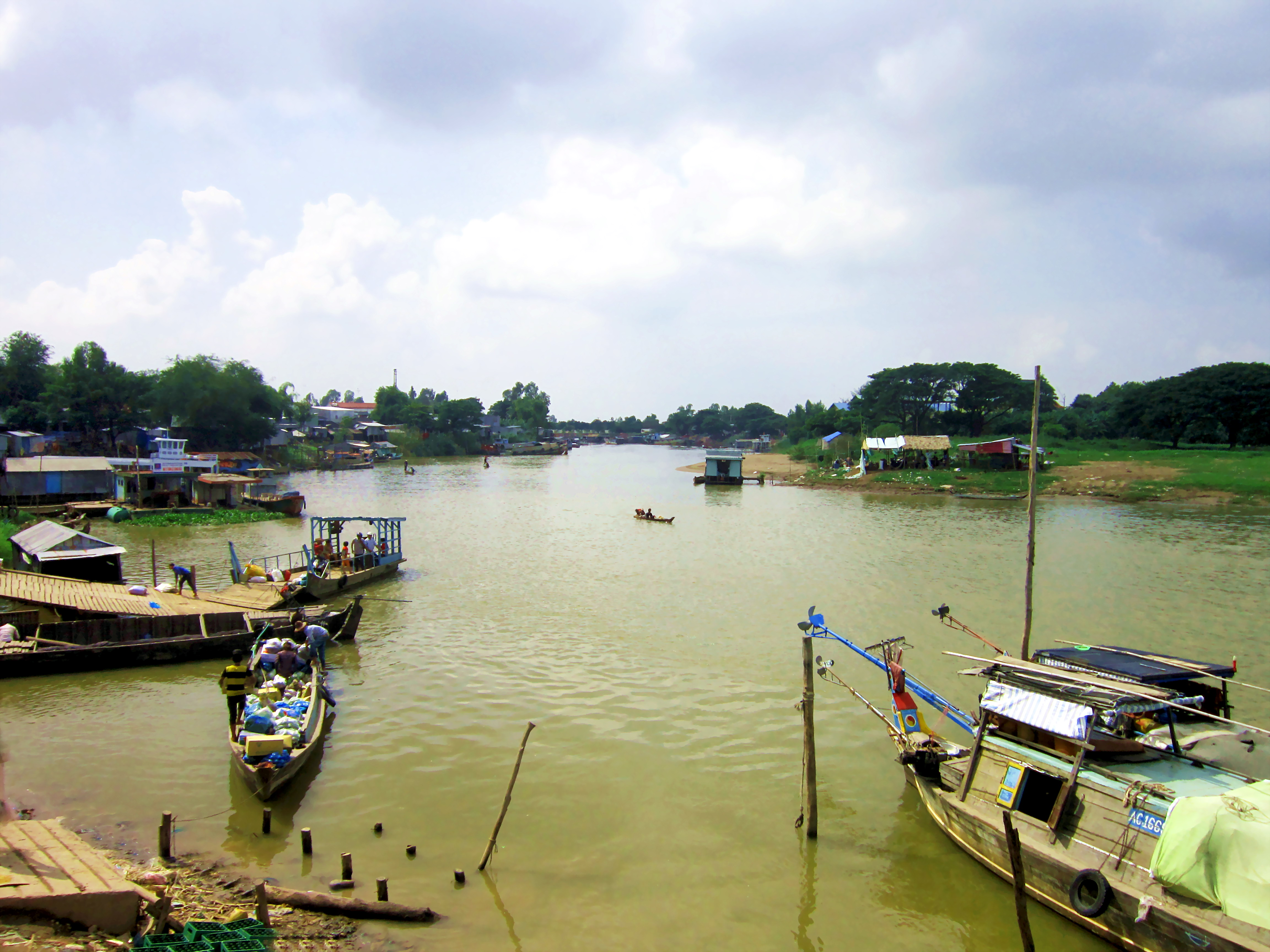
Ferry port at Long Binh town market (An Phu, An Giang, Vietnam), by Binh Di river. At this time, this river becomes the natural border between Vietnam and Cambodia (right bank of the photo).

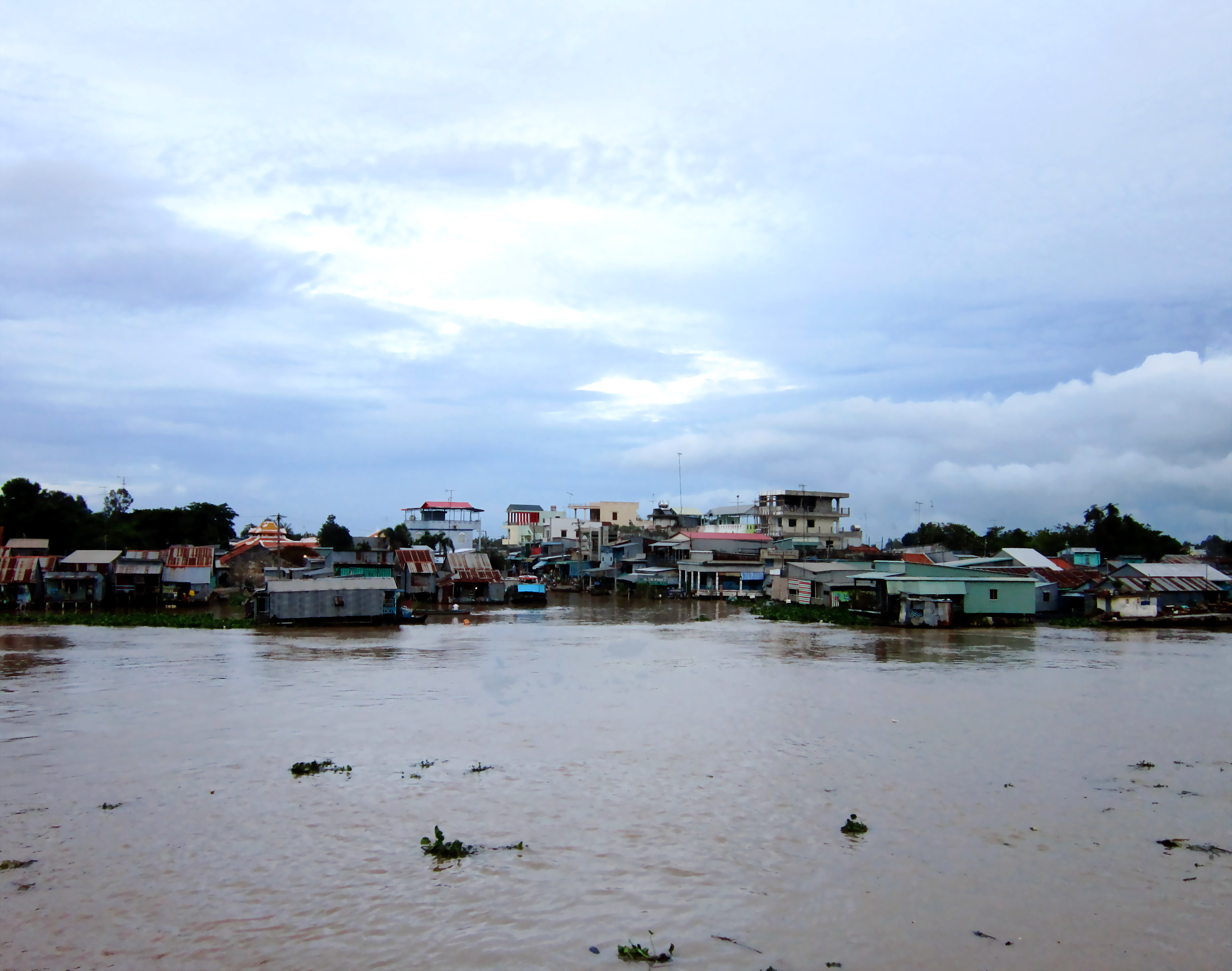
In the afternoon on Chau Doc river, Chau Giang wharf in Da Phuoc, in An Phu district, An Giang province, Vietnam.

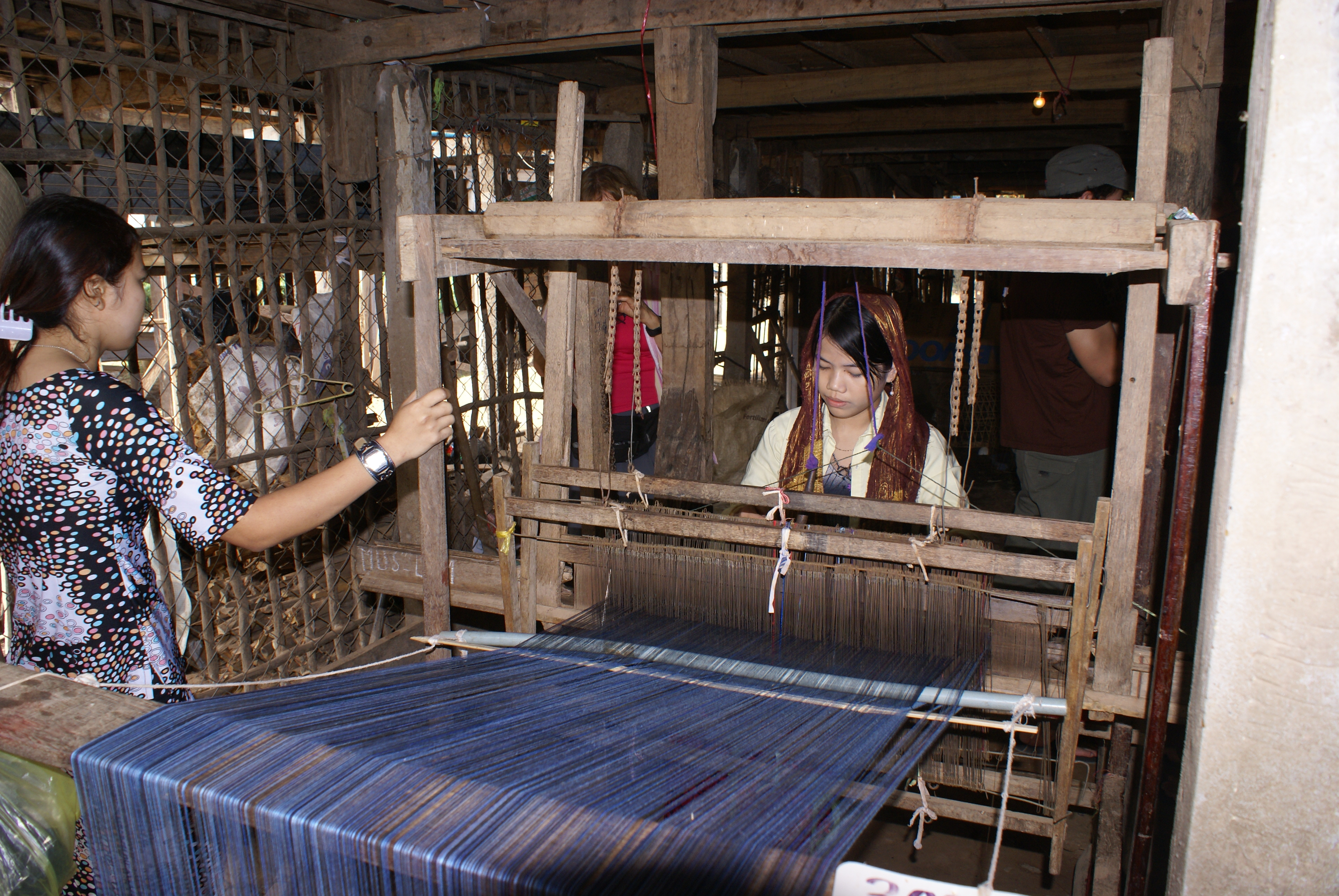
Cham people weave fabrics in Da Phuoc

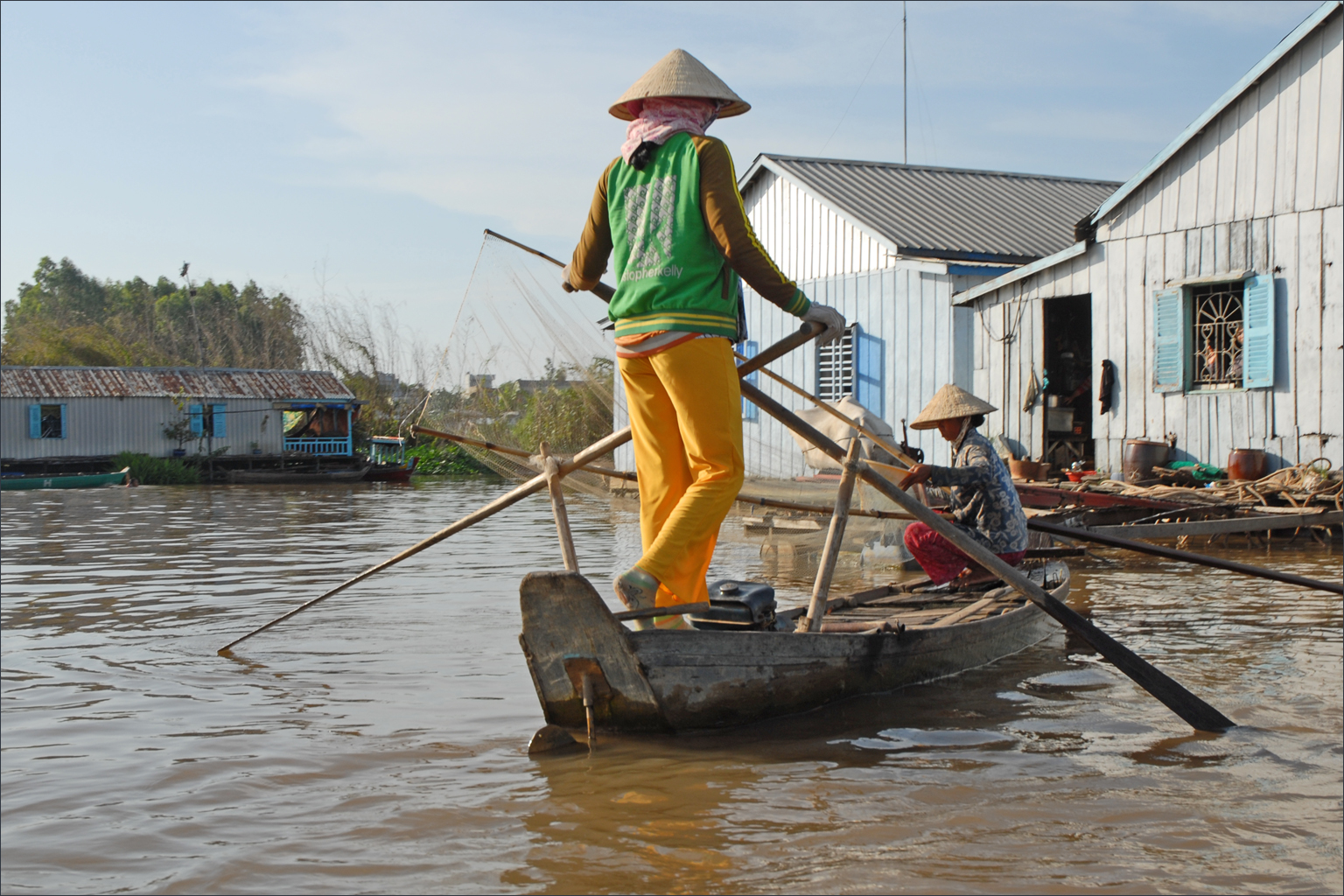
Canoeing in Con Tien floating village

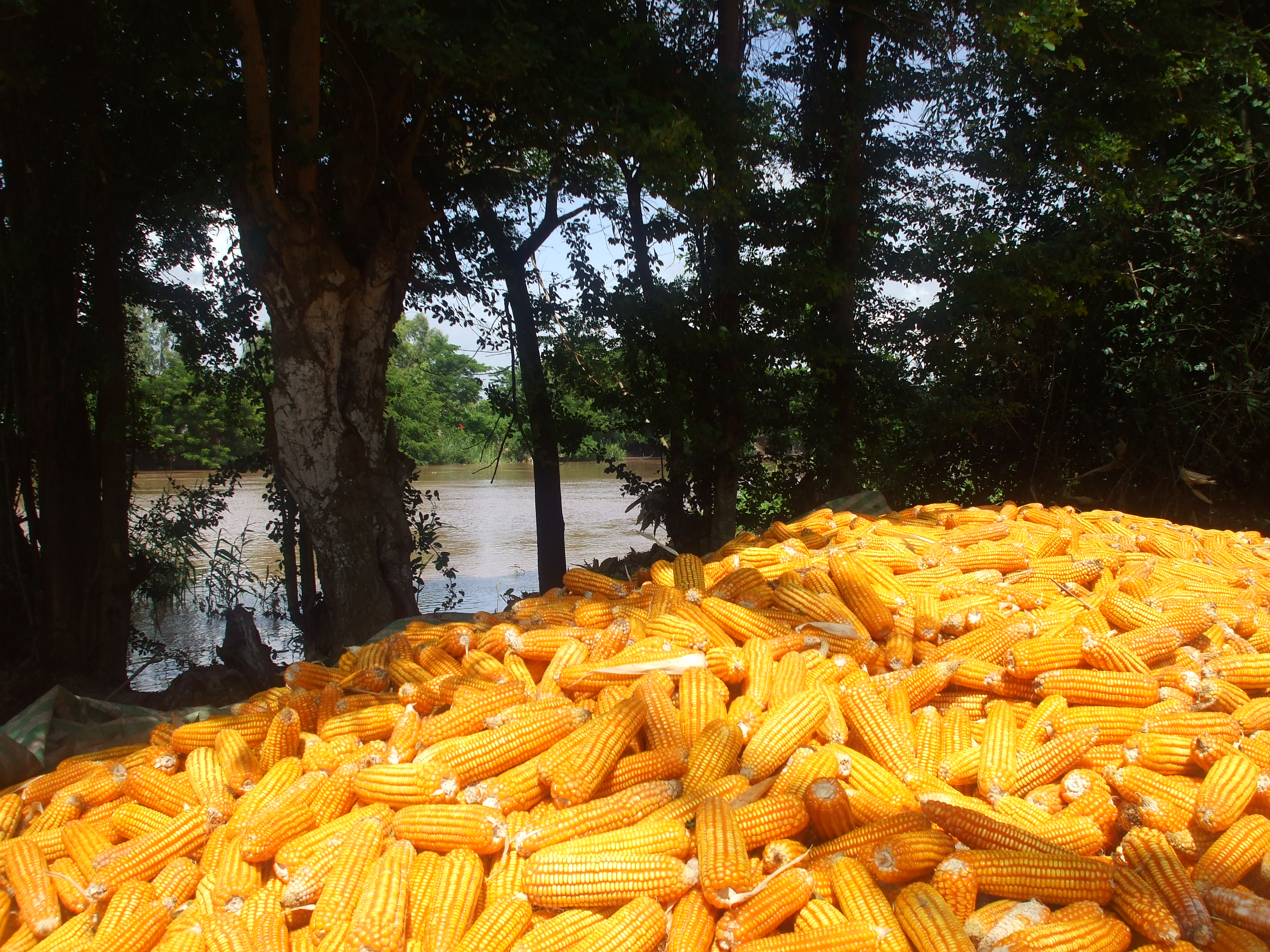
Yellow corn in An Phu

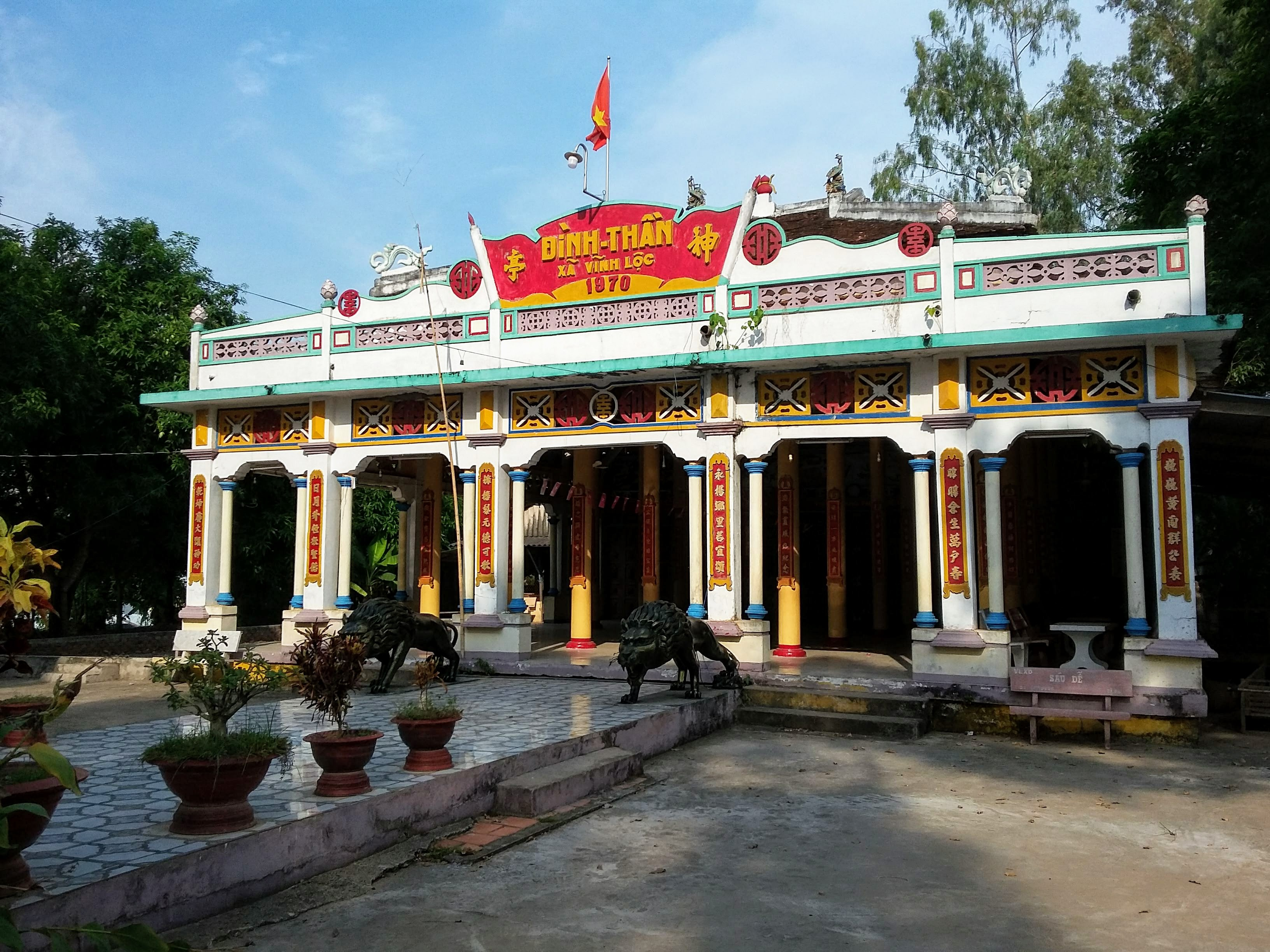
Temple in Vinh Loc commune.

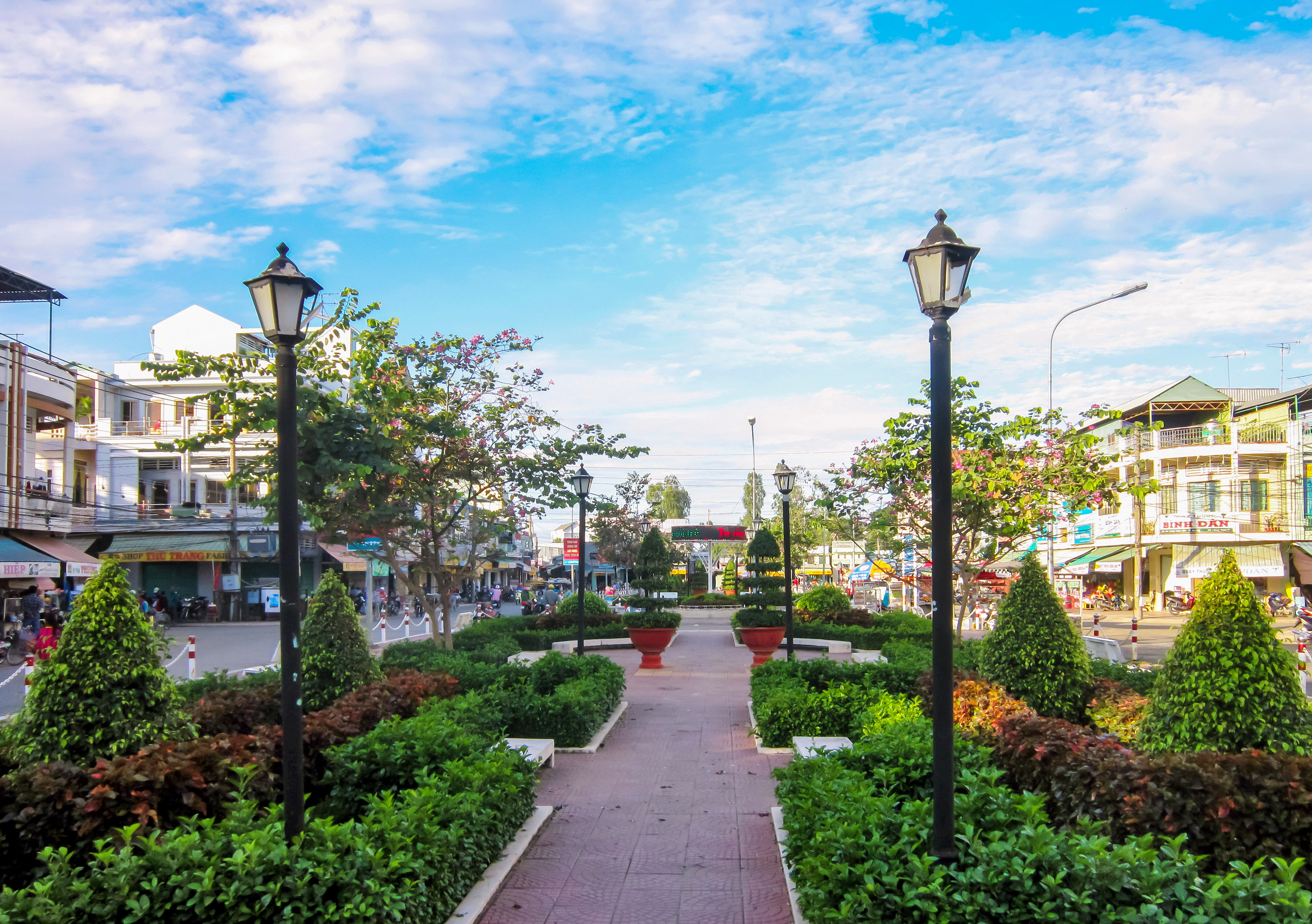
Central park in An Phu town, in An Phu district, An Giang, Vietnam.

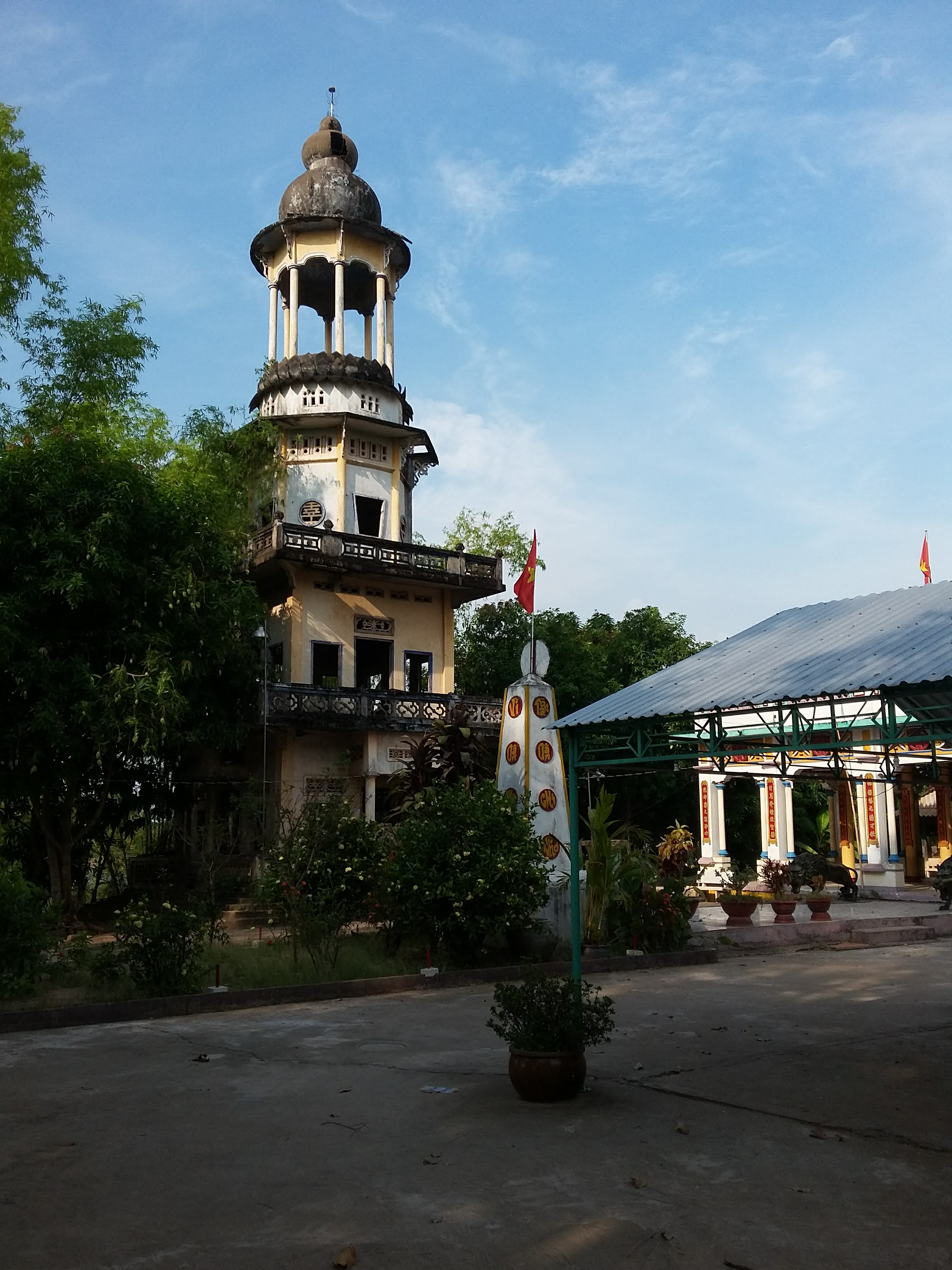
The old lecture station at the communal house in Vinh Loc commune.
