= Khánh Bình, An Giang =

Khánh Bình
- Rural commune and village
- Location in Vietnam
- Coordinates: 10°41′N 105°11′E
- Country: Vietnam
- Province: An Giang
- Time zone: UTC+07:00 (Indochina Time)

Khánh Bình is a rural commune (xã) and village of An Giang Province, Vietnam.
