= An Phú, An Giang =

An Phú
- Commune
- Location in Vietnam
- Coordinates: 10°51′N 105°5′E
- Country: Vietnam
- Province: An Giang Province
- Established: 1984

Area
  - Total: 3.15 sq mi (8.16 km^{2})

Population (1999)
  - Total: 11,108
  - Density: 3,520/sq mi (1,361/km^{2})
- Time zone: UTC+7 (UTC+7)
- Climate: Aw

An Phú is a commune (xã) of An Giang Province, Vietnam. It is connected to Phnom Penh in Cambodia via the National Road 21.
