= List of rivers of Vietnam =

This is a list of streams and rivers in Vietnam:

== Northwestern ==
Northwestern Vietnam

- Black River (Asia)
- Mã River
- Nanxi River (Yunnan)
- Bôi River

== Northeastern ==
Northeastern Vietnam

- Gâm River
- Lô River
- Phó Đáy River
- Nho Quế River
- Bằng River
- Quây Sơn River
- Bản Thín River
- Bắc Giang River
- Bắc Khê River
- Kỳ Cùng River
- Lục Nam River
- Thương River
- Cầu River
- Công River
- Sỏi River
- Thái Bình River
- Beilun River
- Thao River

== Red River Delta ==
Red River Delta

- Red River
- Luộc River
- Cà Lồ River
- Đuống River
- Cấm River
- Kinh Môn River
- Kinh Thầy River
- Đáy River
- Hoàng Long River
- Bạch Đằng River
- Tô Lịch River

== North Central Coast ==
North Central Coast

- Cả River
- Nam Sam River
- Gianh River
- Kiến Giang River
- Long Đại River
- Nhật Lệ River
- Ron (river, Vietnam)
- Son River (Vietnam)
- Sepon River
- Thạch Hãn River
- Bến Hải River
- Perfume River
- Kong River

== South Central Coast ==
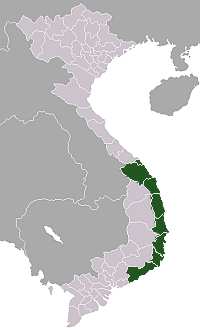
South Central Coast

- Cu Đê River
- Hàn River
- Túy Loan River
- Yên River
- Cầu Đỏ/Cẩm Lệ River
- Vu Gia River
- Thu Bồn River
- Trà Bồng River
- Trà Khúc River
- Côn River
- Hà Thanh River
- La Tinh River
- Hinh River
- Đà Rằng River
- Cái River
- Cà Ty River
- La Ngà River
- Phan River

== Central Highlands ==
Central Highlands, Vietnam

- Krông Nô River
- Krông Năng River
- Krông Ana River
- Srepok River
- Tonlé San
- Đa Nhim River

== Southeastern ==
Southeastern, Vietnam

- Vàm Cỏ Đông River
- Bé River
- Đồng Nai River
- Thị Vải River
- Ray River
- Saigon River
- Bến Nghé Channel
- Soài Rạp
- Vàm Cỏ River
- Dinh River

== Mekong Delta ==
Mekong Delta

- Tiền River
- Mỹ Tho River
- Gò Công River
- Bến Tre River
- Ba Lai River
- Cổ Chiên River
- Hàm Luông River
- Bình Di River
- Châu Đốc River
- Bassac River, or Hậu River
- Vàm Nao River
- Bảo Định Canal
- Tàu Hủ Canal
- Thoại Hà Canal
- Trẹm River
- Cửa Lớn River
- Bồ Đề River
- Ông Đốc River

=== Phú Quốc island ===
- Dương Đông River

== Gallery ==
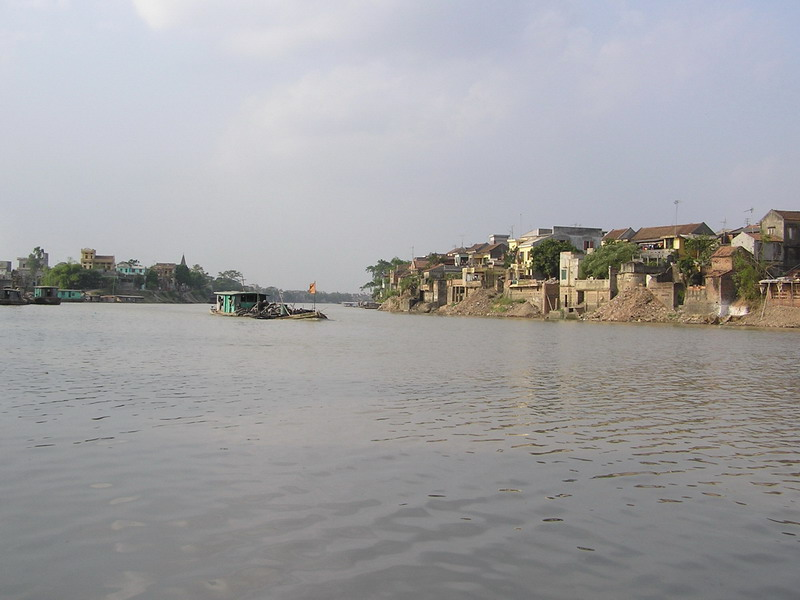
Cầu River near Bắc Giang

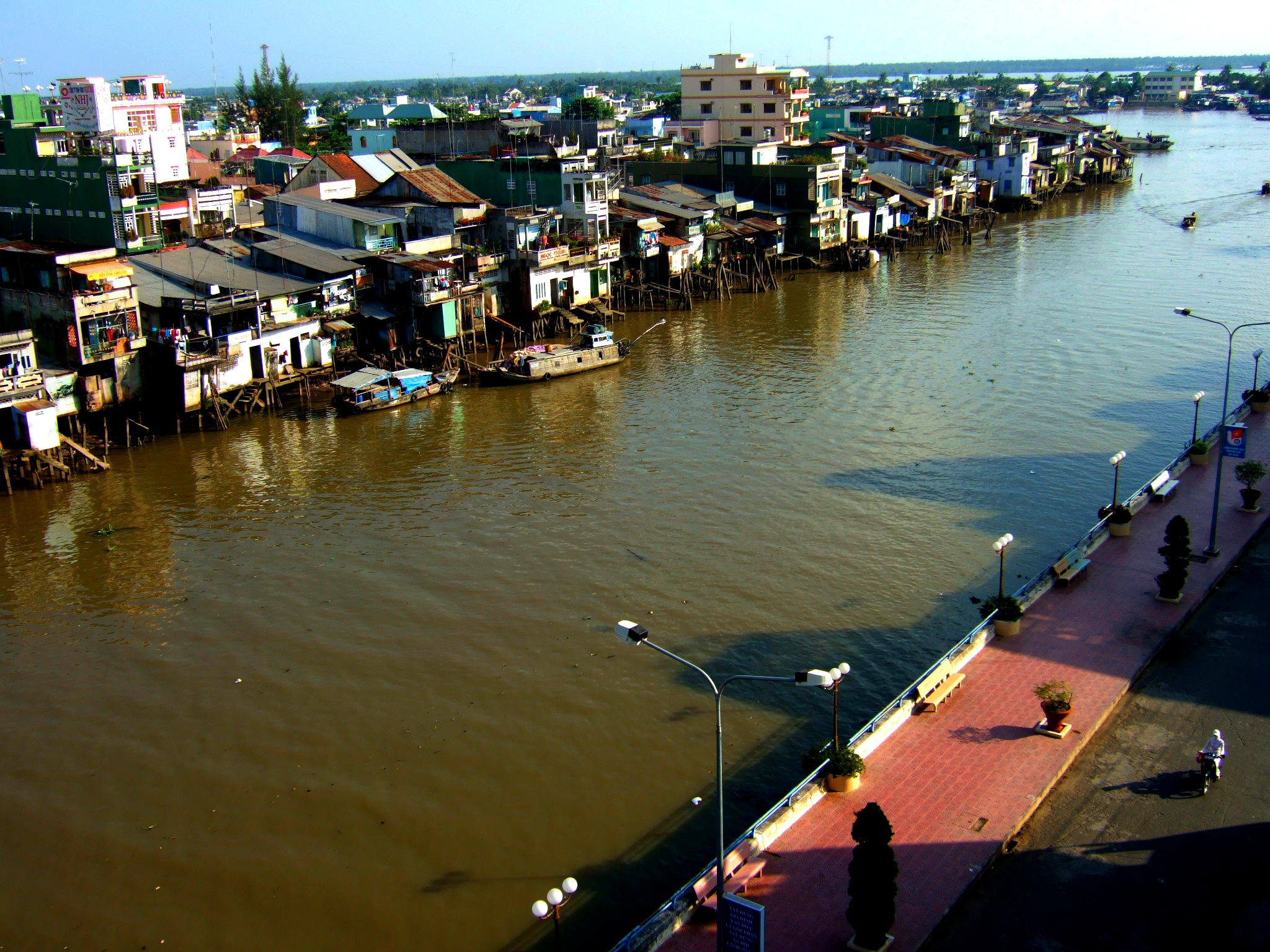
Mỹ Tho River in Mekong Delta

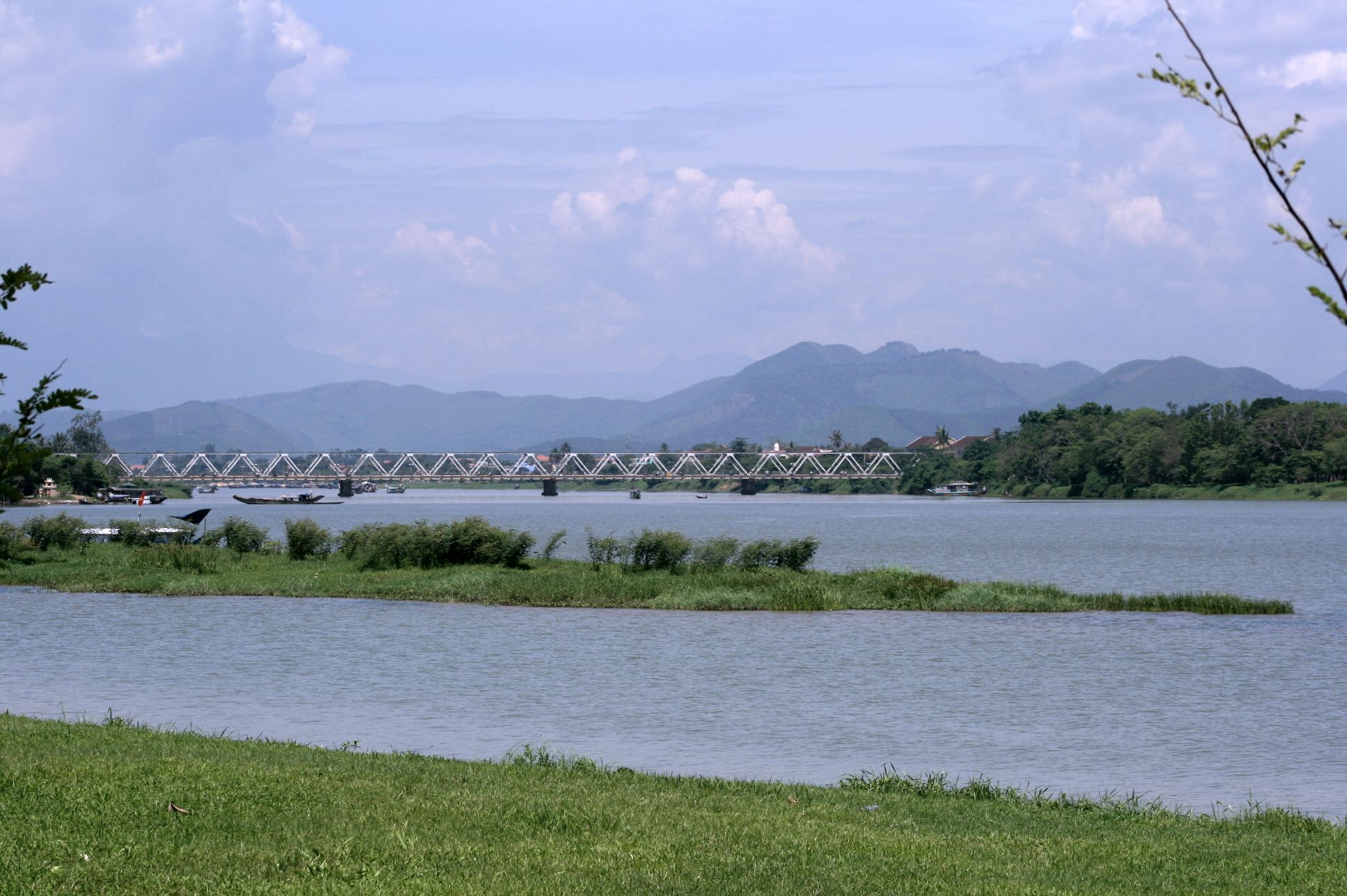
Perfume River at Huế

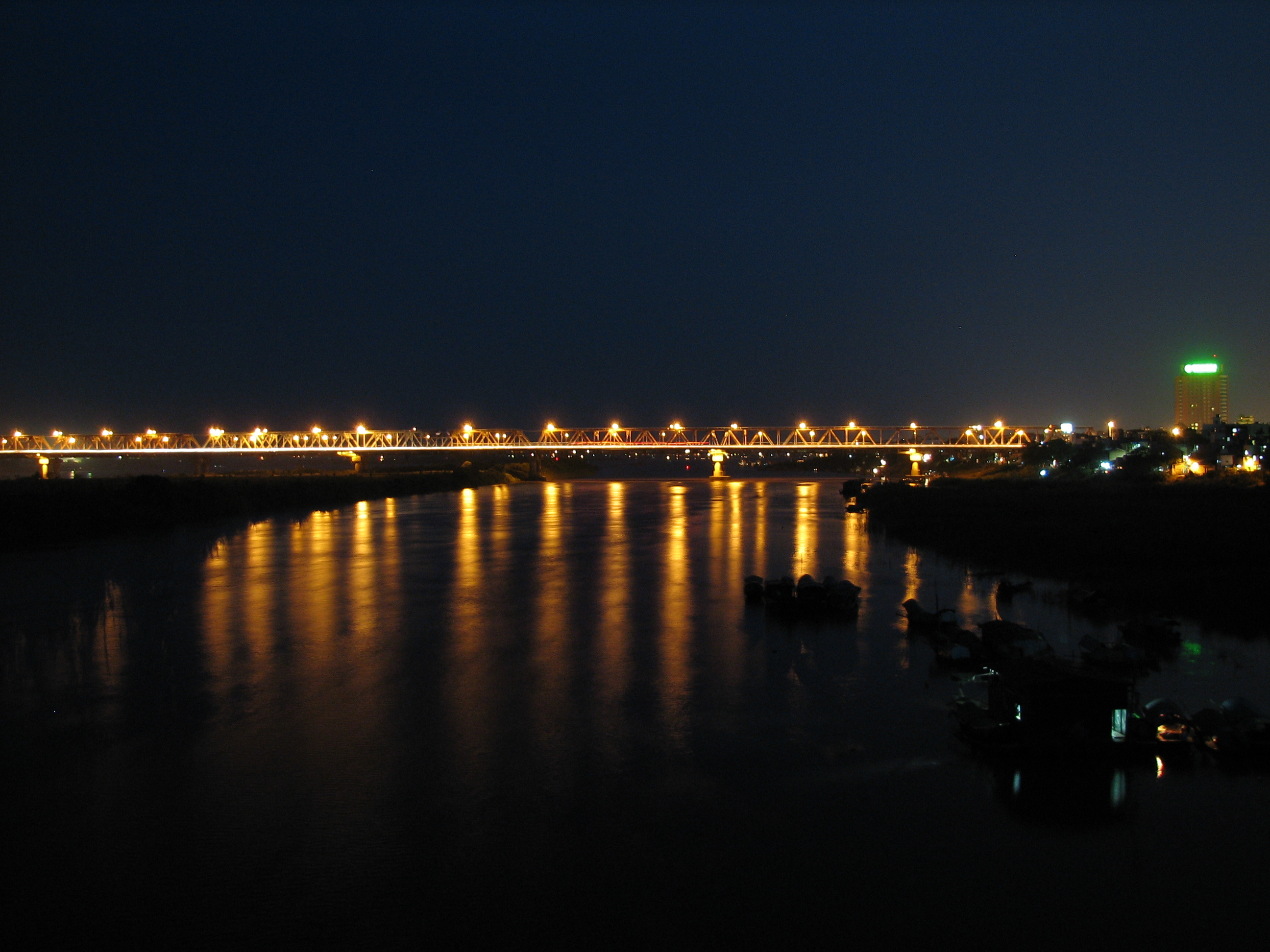
Chuong Duong Bridge over the Red River in Hanoi

== Notes ==
1. The list of rivers almost exactly from North to South.

== See also ==
- List of waterways
- Mekong River Commission
- Vietnam Inland Waterways Administration
- Rivers in Vietnam
