= 2025 Northern Vietnam floods =

Natural disaster in Vietnam

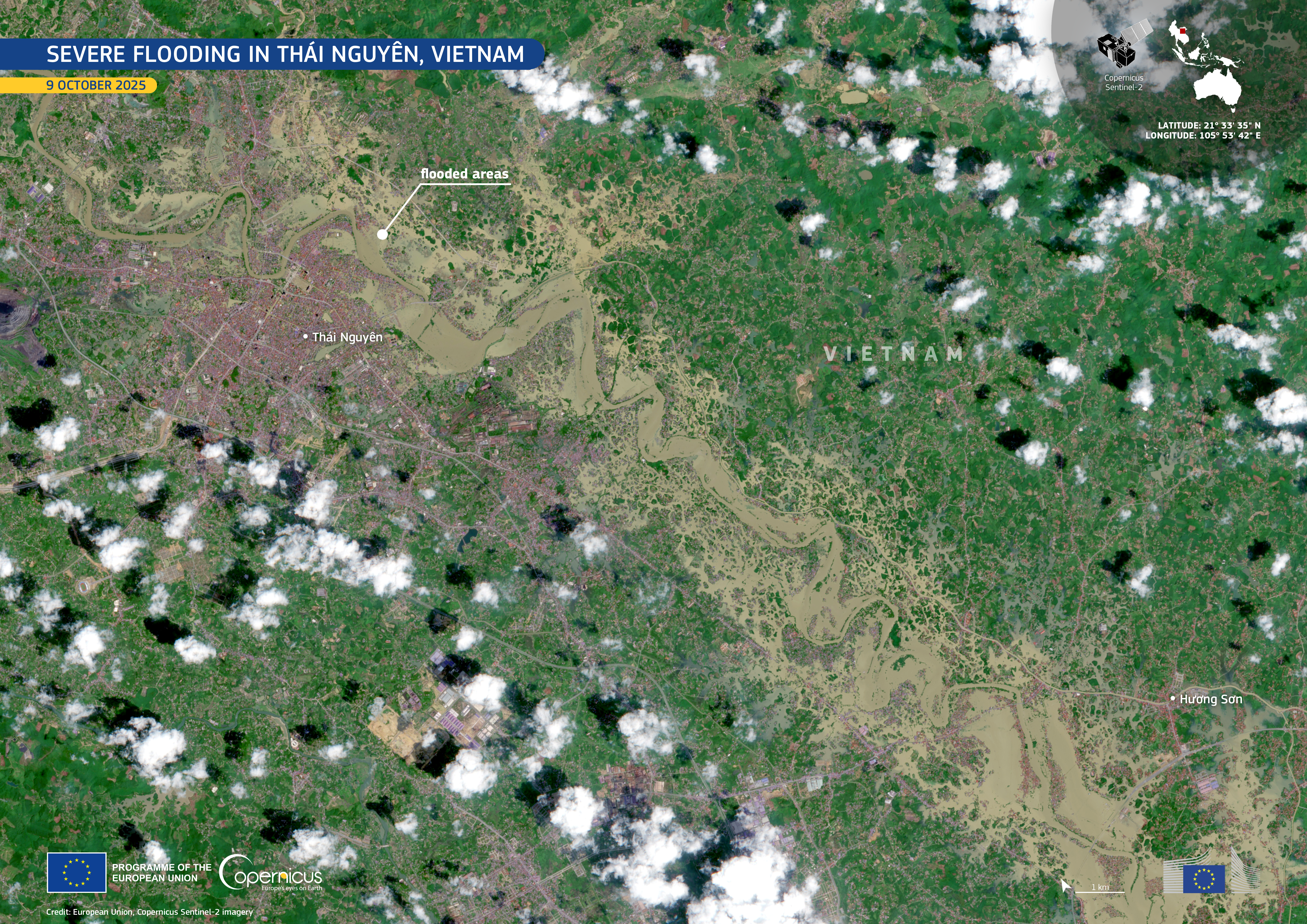
- Map of Thái Nguyên Province after floods
- Cause: Heavy rains due to the impacts of tropical cyclones Ragasa, Bualoi, Matmo enhanced by tropical convergence

Meteorological history
- Duration: 25 September – 16 October 2025

Flood
- Max. rainfall: 857 millimetres (33.7 in)

Overall effects
- Casualties: 85+ (deaths and missing)
- Damage: $1.79 billion (2025 USD)
- Areas affected: Vietnam (particularly Northern Vietnam and North Central Coast)

The 2025 Northern Vietnam floods were a series of floods that affected Vietnam, particularly Northern Vietnam and parts of the North Central Coast, between 25 September and 16 October 2025, resulting from the combined impacts of three tropical cyclones and several other weather phenomena.

Heavy rainfall began on 25 September in northern Vietnam due to the impact of Typhoon Ragasa as it made landfall in Quảng Ninh province according to the National Center for Hydro-Meteorological Forecasting (NCHMF). The rain was subsequently intensified by an intertropical convergence zone, extending southward to the North Central Coast the following day. On 28 and 29 September, Typhoon Bualoi made landfall in Hà Tĩnh province, bringing extremely heavy rain that continued over northern Vietnam and the North Central Coast until 1 October. Shortly afterward, Typhoon Matmo moved across the Vietnam–China border area, bringing widespread rainfall to northern Vietnam from 6 to 8 October before dissipating inland. The period concluded with another spell of heavy rain between 13 and 15 October, caused by a weak cold surge interacting with an easterly disturbance. Several rainfall stations recorded historic precipitation levels during these events. Prolonged heavy rain led to rapid rises in river levels across the northern and north-central regions, with many rivers reaching Alert Level 3, the highest flood warning threshold in Vietnam’s flood warning system. On the Thương and Cầu river basins, which form part of the upper Thái Bình river system, some stations registered record-breaking flood peaks. Extensive flooding occurred in many provinces, particularly Thái Nguyên, Bắc Ninh, Lạng Sơn, and Cao Bằng. In Hanoi, torrential rain on 30 September and 7 October caused widespread urban flooding. Numerous dyke and dam failures were also reported, most notably the collapse of the Bắc Khê hydropower dam in Lạng Sơn province.

This flood event, combined with typhoons Ragasa, Bualoi, and Matmo, caused severe damage to both life and property. Including the effects of the storms, the total economic losses were estimated at 35.7 trillion VND (US$1.42 billion), with 85 people dead or missing. Due to the severe impacts of the disaster, the Vietnamese government called for donations and support from both domestic and international communities.

== Background and preparations ==
According to Vietnam’s meteorological authorities, 2025 was identified as a neutral ENSO year, with forecasts predicting 8 to 11 tropical storms and depressions forming over the South China Sea between August and October, of which 4 to 5 were expected to affect the mainland, mainly in central Vietnam. Since June 2025, the country had already experienced three major storm and flood events: the first from 10 to 13 June, caused indirectly by Tropical Storm Wutip, which brought record rainfall to parts of the central region; the second in late July under the influence of Tropical Storm Wipha; and the third in late August, associated with tropical cyclones Kajiki and Nongfa.

In September 2025, before the formation of Ragasa, tropical cyclones Tapah and Mitag developed over the South China Sea but made landfall in China, without directly affecting Vietnam. On 20 September, as Mitag weakened over land in China, Vietnamese forecasters reported the development of a new system that would later become Typhoon Ragasa, expected to intensify into a super typhoon and potentially impact northern and north-central Vietnam between 24 and 26 September. Late on 22 September, Ragasa entered the South China Sea with maximum sustained winds assessed by NCHMF to be at super typhoon threshold. Nguyễn Hoàng Hiệp, Vietnam’s Deputy Minister of Agriculture and Environment, described Ragasa as the strongest typhoon ever recorded by the country over the South China Sea.

On 23 September, the Vietnamese government issued an official telegram to prepare for Ragasa and warned of possible subsequent storms and flooding. According to Vietnam's meteorological authorities, Ragasa weakened below super typhoon intensity on 24 September and continued to lose intensity as it neared Móng Cái, Quảng Ninh province. Meanwhile, Bualoi developed east of the Philippines and tracked westward toward the South China Sea, with domestic forecasts indicating a potential impact on Vietnam and heavy rainfall. The government subsequently issued a series of official directives and telegrams in late September and early October in response to Bualoi, Matmo, and the ensuing floods.

== Effects ==

Typhoon Ragasa, Typhoon Bualoi and Typhoon Matmo as they made landfall in or close to Vietnam

On 25 September, Ragasa moved into the coastal waters of Quảng Ninh province and weakened into a tropical depression before making landfall and further dissipating into a low-pressure area. The storm’s remnant circulation, followed by the influence of an intertropical convergence zone, brought widespread heavy rainfall across the northern provinces beginning on the same day.

Three days later, on 28 September, Bualoi made landfall in Hà Tĩnh province–northern Quảng Trị province, producing another episode of extensive heavy rainfall that persisted until 1 October. According to Vietnam’s meteorological authorities, accumulated rainfall during this period generally ranged from 150 mm (5.9 in) to 250 mm (9.8 in), while southern Sơn La, southern Phú Thọ, Lào Cai, and Hanoi recorded totals between 250 mm (9.8 in) and 400 mm (16 in). From Thanh Hóa to Huế, rainfall reached 300–450 mm (12–18 in), with Thanh Hóa–Nghệ An and Huế experiencing 450–550 mm (18–22 in), and some locations exceeding 600 mm (24 in).

Several sites reported exceptionally high totals, including Tà Si Láng (Lào Cai) 685 mm (27.0 in), Km46 (Sơn La) 557 mm (21.9 in), Ngọc Sơn (Phú Thọ) 595 mm (23.4 in), Xuân Bình (Thanh Hóa) 836 mm (32.9 in), Cẩm Liên 2 (Thanh Hóa) 811 mm (31.9 in), Mỹ Sơn 1 (Nghệ An) 651 mm (25.6 in), Hủa Na (Nghệ An) 659 mm (25.9 in), Sơn Hồng 1 (Hà Tĩnh) 609 mm (24.0 in), Đức Hóa (Quảng Trị) 593 mm (23.3 in), Bạch Mã (Huế) 857 mm (33.7 in), and Quan Tượng Đài (Huế) 695 mm (27.4 in). Seven rainfall stations recorded daily precipitation maxima exceeding their historical September records on 29 and 30 September.

In the early morning of 6 October, Matmo made landfall in Guangxi, China, before moving into the Vietnam–China border region. The northern and north-central provinces again experienced widespread heavy rain. Particularly in the northeastern region, as well as southern Tuyên Quang, Thái Nguyên, and Hanoi, rainfall totals ranged from 150 mm (5.9 in) to 250 mm (9.8 in), locally exceeding 300 mm (12 in); Thái Nguyên province recorded 250–350 mm (9.8–13.8 in), with some locations above 450 mm (18 in). Notable totals included Quyết Thắng (Lạng Sơn) 339 mm (13.3 in), Hồng An (Cao Bằng) 312 mm (12.3 in), Ghềnh Gà (Tuyên Quang) 266 mm (10.5 in), Gia Bảy (Thái Nguyên) 606 mm (23.9 in), Hóa Thượng (Thái Nguyên) 601 mm (23.7 in), Thái Nguyên city 528 mm (20.8 in), Bố Hạ (Bắc Ninh) 515 mm (20.3 in), Xuân Hương (Bắc Ninh) 485 mm (19.1 in), Sóc Sơn (Hanoi) 300 mm (12 in), and Láng (Hanoi) 271 mm (10.7 in). At the Thái Nguyên and Bắc Giang meteorological stations, record-breaking daily rainfall totals of 491.3 mm (19.34 in) and 365.4 mm (14.39 in) were observed on 7 October, surpassing not only previous October records but also the highest daily rainfall values ever measured at those sites.

From 13 to 16 October, northern Vietnam experienced yet another round of heavy rainfall, caused by the interaction of a weak cold surge with easterly winds on the southern periphery of a subtropical ridge. Significant totals were recorded at Tiên Yên (Quảng Ninh) 386 mm (15.2 in), Đông Long (Hưng Yên) 371 mm (14.6 in), and Mỹ Lộc (Hưng Yên) 314 mm (12.4 in). In Haiphong, localized rainfall exceeded 100 mm (3.9 in) on 14 October.

=== Flood levels ===
Vietnam flood warning scale
Alert Level 3
Alert Level 2
Alert Level 1
Below AL1

All times in this section are in Indochina Time (ICT) unless noted otherwise.

Widespread heavy rainfall produced by the combined effects of three typhoons and an intertropical convergence zone over the northern and north-central provinces of Vietnam triggered a major flood across the river systems in these regions. Beginning on 27 September, river levels in northern Vietnam began to rise. The Tuyên Quang Reservoir opened eight bottom gates, the Thác Bà Reservoir opened three surface gates, and the Hòa Bình Reservoir opened two bottom gates to regulate flow. On the Red River system, the flood crest on the Lô River at Hà Giang reached 106.47 m (349.3 ft), exceeding Alert Level 3 on Vietnam's three-level flood warning system by 3.47 m (11.4 ft) and surpassing the historic 1969 flood peak by 0.90 m (3.0 ft) on 1 October. On the Thao River, the peak water level at Lào Cai was 83.44 m (273.8 ft) at 05:00 on 30 September, 0.06 m (0.20 ft) below Alert Level 3. At Yên Bái, the flood peak reached 34.39 m (112.8 ft) at 11:00 on the same day, 2.39 m (7.8 ft) above Alert Level 3. The Red River at the Hanoi station crested at 9.56 m (31.4 ft) on the morning of 2 October, corresponding to Alert Level 1. On the Tích and Bùi Rivers, water levels remained at Alert Level 3 for several days until 5 October. By 13 October, floodwaters on the Tích River in Hanoi had receded to slightly above Alert Level 1, while the Bùi, Nhuệ, and Đáy Rivers had fallen below that threshold. In Ninh Bình province, on 1 October, flood levels on the Đáy, Hoàng Long, Đào, and Ninh Cơ Rivers also surpassed Alert Level 3.

Record-breaking flood levels during the 2025 Northern Vietnam floods (relative to sea level)
River system	River	Station	Prior peak	2025 peak
Red River system	Lô River	Hà Giang (Tuyên Quang)	105.57 m (1969)	106.47 m (1 October)
Red River system	Ngòi Hút River	Ngòi Hút (Lào Cai)	55.68m (2018)	56.60m (30 September)
Red River system	Ngòi Thia River	Ngòi Thia (Lào Cai)	48.50m (1968)	48.56m (29 September)
Mã River system	Bưởi River	Kim Tân (Thanh Hóa)	14.25 m (2007)	14.33 m (1 October)
Mã River system	Cầu Chày river	Ngọc Lặc (Thanh Hóa)	30.40 m (2012)	31.30 m (29 September)
Mã River system	Mã River	Cẩm Thủy (Thanh Hóa)	22.20 m (2018)	22.25 m (29 September)
Kỳ Cùng – Bằng Giang river system	Bằng River	Bằng Giang (Cao Bằng)	184.84 m (1986)	185.79 m (7 October)
Thái Bình river system	Trung River	Hữu Lũng (Lạng Sơn)	22.54 m (1986)	24.31 m (8 October)
Thái Bình river system	Thương River	Cầu Sơn (Bắc Ninh)	17.42 m (2008)	18.37 m (9 October)
Thái Bình river system	Thương River	Phủ Lạng Thương (Bắc Ninh)	7.52 m (1986)	7.60 m (9 October)
Thái Bình river system	Cầu River	Gia Bảy (Thái Nguyên)	28.81 m (2024)	29.90 m (8 October)
Thái Bình river system	Cầu River	Chã (Thái Nguyên)	11.02 m (1971)	12.02 m (9 October)
Thái Bình river system	Cầu River	Phúc Lộc Phương (Bắc Ninh)	9.40 m (2024)	9.98 m (9 October)
Thái Bình river system	Cà Lồ River	Mạnh Tân (Hanoi)	9.34 m (2024)	9.75 m (10 October)
Other rivers	Yên River	Chuối (Thanh Hóa)	4.47 m (1978)	4.92 m (29 September)

On the Thái Bình river system, during 2–3 October, the Cầu River at Đáp Cầu and the Thương River at Phủ Lạng Thương reached or approached Alert Level 3, while the Thái Bình River at Phả Lại rose to Alert Level 2. A week later, the upper reaches of the Thái Bình system recorded historic flood values. On 8 October, the Cầu River at Gia Bảy peaked at 29.9 m (98 ft), exceeding the 2024 Yagi typhoon flood record by 1.09 m (3.6 ft). The same day, the Thương River at Hữu Lũng (Lạng Sơn province) crested at 24.31 m (79.8 ft) at 14:00, exceeding the 1986 historic flood level of 22.54 m (74.0 ft) by 1.77 m (5.8 ft). On 9 October, new records were also set at Phủ Lạng Thương and Phúc Lộc Phương: the Thương River reached 7.6 m (25 ft) at Phủ Lạng Thương, surpassing the 1986 flood, while the Cầu River rose to 12.02 m (39.4 ft), 1.0 m (3.3 ft) above the 1971 record. Phúc Lộc Phương peaked at 9.98 m (32.7 ft), exceeding the 2024 record. At Cầu Sơn, the Thương River reached 18.37 m (60.3 ft), 0.95 m (3.1 ft) above the 2008 record. In the Cầu River basin near Hanoi, the first flood peak on the Cầu and Cà Lồ Rivers occurred on 3 October. A second peak followed on the Cà Lồ River at Mạnh Tân, reaching 9.75 m (32.0 ft) on 10 October, 0.41 m (1.3 ft) above the 2024 record, while the Cầu River at Lương Phúc peaked at 10.16 m (33.3 ft) (2.26 m (7.4 ft) above Alert Level 3) on 9 October. By 13 October, the Alert Level 3 warning was lifted for the Thương River at Phủ Lạng Thương, and Alert Level 2 warnings were withdrawn for the Cầu River at Đáp Cầu and Phúc Lộc Phương (Bắc Ninh), as well as for the Cầu and Cà Lồ Rivers at Lương Phúc and Mạnh Tân (Hanoi). On 14 October, only three stations were still reporting water levels above Alert Level 1. By 16 October, the Thương River at Phủ Lạng Thương had fallen below Alert Level 1, leaving only Cầu Sơn still slightly above that mark. (Note: As of 19 October, water levels at all rivers in Northern Vietnam have gone below Alert Level 1 threshold.)

On the Bằng Giang River at Cao Bằng, flood levels broke records twice during this event. On 1 October, the river crested at 185.22 m (607.7 ft), surpassing the 1986 record of 184.84 m (606.4 ft). At 23:00 on 7 October, it rose again to 185.79 m (609.5 ft), 0.95 m (3.1 ft) above the 1986 peak.

On the Mã river system, water levels on the Bưởi River at Kim Tân (Thanh Hóa province) reached 14.33 m (47.0 ft) on 1 October, 2.33 m (7.6 ft) above Alert Level 3 and 0.08 m (0.26 ft) higher than the 2007 record; in the Cầu Chày River in Ngọc Lặc flood peak breaking 2012 record. In the Mã River, flood peak at Cẩm Thủy Station breaking 2018 record, and at Giàng crested at 6.97 m (22.9 ft) at 09:00 on 30 September, 0.47 m (1.5 ft) above Alert Level 3. Other rivers in Thanh Hóa also reached Alert Level 3 on the same day. On the Cả river system in Nghệ An province, the Mường Xén station recorded a peak of 142.11 m (466.2 ft) at 08:00 on 30 September, 0.11 m above Alert Level 3, while at Con Cuông, the level reached 31.11 m (102.1 ft) at 01:00, 0.61 m (2.0 ft) above Alert Level 3. On the Lam River at Yên Thượng, the water level peaked at 9.56 m (31.4 ft) at 04:00 on 1 October, 0.56 m (1.8 ft) above Alert Level 3. In Hà Tĩnh province, flood crests on the Ngàn Phố and Ngàn Sâu Rivers at Sơn Diệm and Chu Lễ on 30 September were 11.52 m (37.8 ft) and 13.05 m (42.8 ft), respectively – near or slightly above Alert Level 2. By 3 October, floodwaters across the north-central region had receded, with many locations falling below Alert Level 1.

=== Impact ===
The heavy rainfall and flooding affected many localities across northern and north-central Vietnam, resulting in widespread inundation. In Hanoi, major downpours on 30 September and 7 October caused severe urban flooding at numerous sites. On 30 September, 116 flooded locations were recorded, and on 7 October, 122 flooded areas and nearly 30 paralyzed roads were reported. Flooding also occurred after Typhoon Bualoi in the provinces of Thanh Hóa, Nghệ An, Ninh Bình, Phú Thọ, Tuyên Quang, and Thái Nguyên. During the rainfall event associated with Typhoon Matmo, Thái Nguyên, Bắc Ninh, Lạng Sơn, and Cao Bằng also experienced extensive inundation. In the final rainfall episode from 13 to 15 October, localized flooding was reported in Haiphong due to heavy rain.

A total of 84 dyke-related incidents occurred across northern provinces following the heavy rains brought by Matmo, while 50 incidents had been recorded earlier during Bualoi. At 13:30 on 7 October, the Bắc Khê 1 hydropower dam, located in Kim Đồng commune, former Tràng Định district (now part of Tân Tiến commune), partially collapsed near its spillway. The initial fissure, initially small, gradually widened into a gap 4–5 meters wide and 3–4 meters deep.

== Aftermath ==
The combination of typhoons Ragasa, Bualoi, and Matmo, together with other rain-inducing weather systems, caused 85 deaths and missing persons – 67 during Bualoi and 18 during Matmo. The total economic losses were estimated at 44.9 trillion VND (US$1.79 billion), including nearly 23.9 trillion VND (US$950 million) attributed to Bualoi and 21.0 trillion VND (US$837 million) to Matmo. The three typhoons and resulting floods caused an estimated 3.2 trillion VND (US$127.3 million) in damage to road transport infrastructure. According to statistics, more than 10,000 educational institutions were affected by the storms and flooding. The Department of Insurance Supervision and Management under the Ministry of Finance reported that, as of 10 October, insurance companies had documented 7 cases of human losses, with compensation estimated at 745 million VND, and 3,746 cases of property damage and other non-life insurance claims, totaling nearly 1.674 trillion VND in estimated losses. The railway sector reported that the total estimated funding needed to remedy the damage was VND 937 billion, including VND 74 billion in losses related to passenger and freight transport, VND 188 billion for first-phase emergency repairs, and up to VND 552 billion required to reinforce the infrastructure and restore train operating speeds.

=== Thái Nguyên ===
Thái Nguyên province recorded the highest number of casualties, with six deaths, one missing person due to flash floods, and one death caused by a landslide. As of 14 October, during the province’s sixth People’s Committee meeting addressing damage from Matmo and its remnants, economic losses were estimated at over 12.2 trillion VND. More than 200,000 houses were reported to be submerged, and approximately 1,010 houses were collapsed or severely damaged due to flooding and landslides.

The floods also damaged a large number of vehicles: 12,631 cars (nearly 8.7% of the province’s total) and 39,628 motorcycles were submerged or damaged. Many automobile repair garages were overwhelmed as flooded vehicles queued for rescue and repair, with restoration costs per car estimated between 30 million VND and 150 million VND, depending on the extent of damage. Numerous businesses, markets, and enterprises suffered heavy losses; the Thái Market (former Thái Nguyên city) ground floor was submerged to a depth of about 3 meters, destroying all goods, with many merchants reporting losses worth billions of đồng. Several local companies reported damage ranging from a few billion to tens of billions of đồng due to inundated warehouses and machinery.

In agriculture, flooding submerged approximately 4,400–5,000 hectares of farmland, including around 2,800 hectares of rice and 1,000 hectares of crops completely lost, as well as 435 hectares of tea severely affected. Preliminary statistics indicated that more than 58,000 poultry were killed or swept away.

In terms of infrastructure, several dyke systems along critical sections such as the Chã, Hà Châu, and Cầu River embankments around Thái Nguyên city suffered breaches, requiring emergency reinforcement over tens of kilometers to prevent overtopping. There were eight locations with landslides or deep flooding along national routes, including National Route 3 and the Hanoi–Thái Nguyên Expressway, where floodwaters reached depths of up to 45 cm. Rail services on the Hanoi–Đồng Đăng line were temporarily suspended. At one point, more than 320,000 households lost power across the province; the headquarters of the Thái Nguyên Power Company was flooded on the first floor, damaging equipment and 23 specialized vehicles, with losses estimated at 16 billion VND. By 14 October, electricity had been restored to about 98% of households, and students resumed classes on 15 October after nearly a week of school closures.

=== Bắc Ninh ===
Bắc Ninh province recorded five deaths and seven injuries due to flooding. A 35-year-old village official in Hợp Thịnh commune died of a stroke while on flood-response duty. As of 12 October, the province’s economic losses were estimated at 1.67 trillion VND. Many residential areas along the Cầu and Thương Rivers were submerged to depths of 0.5–1.5 meters for nearly a week. Across the province, more than 15,000 households were evacuated or isolated by floodwaters, and 402 houses were reported damaged.

In agriculture, nearly 8,000 hectares of rice and crops and 941 hectares of fruit trees were inundated. More than 314,000 poultry and about 5,000 livestock were killed by floods, while 2,187 hectares of aquaculture ponds were destroyed.

In terms of infrastructure, 66 dyke-related incidents occurred in the province. In the early morning of 8 October, a 15-meter section of an inner dyke in Tiên Lục commune collapsed after being overtopped by floodwater, though no casualties occurred as residents had been evacuated beforehand. By the morning of 14 October, 17,254 households remained without power because flooded substations had not yet been restored. Approximately 240 schools and 60 medical stations were flooded or isolated.

For transportation, four locations along national highways crossing Bắc Ninh were submerged or affected by landslides, causing road blockages. In total, 684 sites suffered erosion or damage; 64 national and provincial roads were flooded, and 17 low crossings were damaged. Facing the threat that the 131-year-old Thương River railway bridge might be swept away, railway authorities stationed a six-car freight train loaded with 300 tons of ore on the bridge to stabilize and weigh it down against the current.

=== Lạng Sơn ===
In Lạng Sơn province, economic losses were estimated at over 1.05 trillion VND, largely due to the remnant circulation of Matmo. Prolonged heavy rainfall caused landslides and widespread flooding, severely affecting livelihoods, property, and infrastructure. According to the provincial People’s Committee, about 5,100 households were affected: 10 houses collapsed, 1 was severely damaged, 6 sustained major damage, 2 were partially damaged, 2,158 houses were flooded, 2,577 were isolated, 249 experienced landslides, 55 were at risk of collapse, and 42 auxiliary structures were destroyed. Rising water levels along rivers inundated large areas in Yên Bình, Vân Nham, Hữu Lũng, Tuấn Sơn, Cai Kinh, Thất Khê, Tràng Định, and Quốc Việt communes. Mountainous areas were severely impacted by flash floods and debris flows, causing heavy losses to agricultural production. Rainfall submerged about 3,894 hectares of rice, 1,028 hectares of crops, and 30 hectares of fruit trees, and damaged or uprooted 58 hectares of planted forest. In Yên Bình commune (former Hữu Lũng district), all 22 villages were inundated, isolating about 2,500 households. The total area of damaged rice, crops, and fruit trees reached 2,230 hectares, including 1,270 hectares of flooded rice. More than 5,000 pigs and over 50,000 poultry were killed or swept away.

However, during the partial collapse of the Bắc Khê 1 hydropower dam in Tân Tiến commune, there were no casualties, as local authorities evacuated residents in time. Initial damages from the incident were estimated at 50 billion VND. Thiệt hại ban đầu do vụ vỡ đập gây ra ước tính 50 tỷ đồng.

=== Cao Bằng ===
The remnants of Matmo brought heavy to very heavy rainfall to Cao Bằng province, causing severe flooding and landslides. Preliminary reports indicated seven deaths and five injuries; more than 14,000 houses were collapsed, unroofed, undermined, or flooded. Over 11,000 hectares of rice, crops, and other plants were inundated, flattened, or buried, and thousands of livestock and poultry were killed or swept away. Many residential areas were cut off, while key transport routes, schools, health facilities, irrigation works, and power and water systems were all seriously damaged. The total estimated losses from the two consecutive storm events exceeded 3 trillion VND.

According to the Vietnam Fatherland Front Committee of Cao Bằng province, 12 suspension, concrete, and rural bridges were damaged or washed away, disrupting transport and severely affecting the lives, education, and livelihoods of residents, particularly in Nguyên Bình, Trường Hà, Trùng Khánh, Thành Công, Minh Khai, and Khánh Xuân communes, where many bridges collapsed or sustained major structural damage. Access roads to several hydropower plants were also damaged by landslides, with the Bình Long hydropower area being the most severely affected. Several Special National Historical Sites in the province were damaged, including the Pác Bó Special National Historical Site and the Trần Hưng Đạo Forest Special National Historical Site.

=== Other regions ===
In Hanoi, heavy rainfall beginning on 29 September, particularly on 30 September, caused severe flooding; students were stranded at schools due to torrential rain. On 6 and 7 October, heavy rainfall returned, prompting the Hanoi Department of Education and Training to suspend classes, with many schools adjusting teaching schedules accordingly. Flooding continued across the city, including along Thăng Long Boulevard, where Coast Guard officers assisted residents in moving stalled vehicles. In Trung Giã commune, northern Hanoi, near the Thái Nguyên border, rising waters of the Cầu and Cà Lồ Rivers caused flooding that isolated more than 2,300 households and resulted in losses worth billions of đồng. The Hanoi–Thái Nguyên railway line was severely damaged by a landslide in the area.

In Hanoi’s vegetable- and flower-growing zones, such as Nhật Tân, Mê Linh, and Tây Tựu – known as major horticultural areas of the capital – severe losses occurred as floodwaters from the Red River, following Typhoon Bualoi, inundated farmland. After prolonged flooding associated with Matmo, most flower crops were destroyed, leaving many farmers without stock to sell. In Đa Phúc commune, about 980 hectares of autumn rice were submerged, including nearly 550 hectares within the paddy area and over 430 hectares outside the dyke system. Numerous canals, drainage sluices, and irrigation works suffered landslides or localized damage, along with extensive property losses for local residents.

In Tuyên Quang province, the remnants of Typhoon Matmo brought widespread heavy rain, resulting in one death and significant damage to housing and transportation infrastructure, severely affecting daily life. On the morning of 8 October, the welcome gate of Đồng Văn commune center – a cultural landmark inaugurated in November 2024 – collapsed due to a landslide. The structure, valued at over 1.5 billion VND and funded entirely through social contributions, had been regarded as a local tourism highlight in the northernmost region.

In the North Central Coast, Thanh Hóa province reported, as of 1 October, more than 17,000 flooded houses, including 1,456 homes damaged. The dyke system sustained 13 incidents involving erosion, seepage, surface subsidence, and slope failures; notably, a 20-meter breach occurred on the right bank of the Thị Long River in Các Sơn commune. Nearly 7 kilometers of canals and about 1 kilometer of embankment at the Hải Tiến tourist area were also eroded. In total, over 14,000 hectares of crops were damaged, including 6,151 hectares of rice, 4,228 hectares of vegetables, 3,590 hectares of annual plants, 2,158 hectares of forest crops, 388 hectares of fruit trees, 161 hectares of flowers and ornamental plants, and 7,633 shade or urban trees. Additionally, about 72 hectares of industrial crops and 140,000 seedlings were destroyed, along with 152 tons of food, 45 tons of salt, and 13 hectares of greenhouses and net houses damaged.

In Nghệ An province, heavy rainfall in mountainous districts caused flooding and landslides, sweeping away or collapsing houses in several communities. Flooding after Typhoon Bualoi damaged or destroyed over 1,500 houses to varying degrees and inundated 45 schools. Nearly 400,000 poultry and more than 1,200 livestock were killed or washed away. Flooding also caused 29 blockages on national and provincial roads and over 150 localized inundation sites on local roads. Numerous rural bridges were swept away, and more than 19 kilometers of roads were damaged by landslides.

== Response ==
=== Domestic response ===
On 3 October, the Office of the Communist Party of Vietnam’s Central Committee issued Official Dispatch No. 18081-CV/VPTW, announcing the Politburo’s directives on recovery efforts following Typhoon Bualoi. The government convened a meeting the same day to discuss post-typhoon recovery, and another one week later to coordinate further responses to Matmo and the ensuing flooding. Prime Minister Phạm Minh Chính personally inspected disaster prevention and recovery operations in Thái Nguyên and Hanoi. On 12 October 2025, the Prime Minister issued Official Telegram No. 196/CĐ-TTg, directing assessments and recovery measures for storm-related damage in the education sector. On 16 October, General Secretary Tô Lâm visited residents in Thái Nguyên province to offer support and condolences.

The Minister of Finance approved the release of national reserve goods to support Cao Bằng and Lạng Sơn provinces in disaster response and search-and-rescue operations. The total aid included 2,600 tons of rice and various specialized materials and equipment. Under the decision, the General Department of State Reserves was instructed to provide Cao Bằng with 600 tons of rice and several rescue tools, including 20 lightweight rescue tents (24.5 m² each), 400 life jackets, 300 lifebuoys, 50 inflatable rafts, four generators (two 30 kVA and two 50 kVA units), three cutting and drilling sets, six firefighting pumps, and six rescue rope sets. Lạng Sơn received 2,000 tons of rice from the national reserves to support residents affected by prolonged flooding and storm impacts.

Prime Minister Phạm Minh Chính also approved an additional 400 billion VND in emergency funding from the Central Budget’s 2025 contingency reserve to aid four northern provinces in recovery: Thái Nguyên received 250 billion VND, Cao Bằng 80 billion VND, Lạng Sơn 50 billion VND, and Bắc Ninh 20 billion VND. This was the second financial aid package issued within less than two weeks for areas severely affected by the disasters. The State Bank of Vietnam has implemented debt repayment rescheduling (VND 1,153 billion), reduced interest rates for nearly 39,900 customers (with total interest support amounting to as much as VND 1,460 billion), and disbursed VND 6,480 billion in loans to support the recovery of production and business activities. The Ministry of National Defence deployed two helicopters from Air Regiment 916 (Hòa Lạc Air Base) and one helicopter from Army Corps 18 to transport Deputy Prime Minister Trần Hồng Hà and a working delegation from Gia Lam Airport on 8 October, carrying relief supplies to Lạng Sơn province. Hưng Yên province also contributed 1 billion VND to assist Lạng Sơn in overcoming disaster impacts.

In Trung Giã commune (Sông Công and Thành Công hamlets) of Hanoi, on the morning of 12 October, hundreds of officers from the Hanoi Police Department and local residents worked together to pump out floodwater, remove mud, and clean houses and furniture.

Acecook Vietnam JSC donated 3,700 boxes of instant noodles. On 2 October, the Vietnamese Fatherland Front Central Committee launched a nationwide appeal for contributions to support recovery from Bualoi and subsequent flooding. By 17 October 2025, individuals, organizations, and enterprises had pledged around 1.025 trillion VND in donations.

=== International response ===
On the afternoon of 13 October, at Noi Bai International Airport in Hanoi, the Department of Dyke Management and Natural Disaster Prevention and Control under the Ministry of Agriculture and Environment received a shipment of emergency relief supplies from the Japan International Cooperation Agency (JICA) to assist residents of Bắc Ninh Province affected by flooding. This marked the first international relief delivery for Vietnamese localities impacted by Typhoon Bualoi and Typhoon Matmo. The shipment included 40 water purifiers, 5,100 blanket sets, 1,000 plastic water containers, and 50 multi-purpose plastic sheets. On the night of 14 October, also at Noi Bai International Airport, Australian Deputy Ambassador to Vietnam Renée Deschamps, Deputy Director General of the Department of Dyke Management and Natural Disaster Prevention and Control Nguyễn Trường Sơn, and Vice Chair of the Bắc Ninh Fatherland Front Committee Thái Hải Anh jointly received a humanitarian aid shipment from the Australian Government, intended to support households and communities severely affected by the storms and floods. According to the Australian Embassy in Vietnam, the Australian Government provided A$3 million (approximately 51 billion VND) in humanitarian assistance to help Vietnam respond to widespread flooding and storm impacts across northern and central regions. The Embassy of South Korea also announced that the South Korean government had approved a US$1 million (approximately 25.4 billion VND) humanitarian grant to aid Vietnam’s disaster recovery. In addition, the ASEAN Coordinating Centre for Humanitarian Assistance on Disaster Management (AHA Centre), the Embassy of Canada, and several other international organizations contributed relief assistance. Total relief assistance reached USD 23.838 million, including pledged commitments, of which more than USD 7 million was in goods, USD 5.8 million was provided as multipurpose cash assistance, and USD 3.8 million was allocated to support home repairs and reconstruction.

== Analysis and controversy ==
The Ministry of Agriculture and Environment of Vietnam assessed the 2025 Northern Vietnam floods as one of the most severe natural disasters in recent decades, characterized by successive major floods over a wide area. The ministry noted that multiple hazardous phenomena occurred almost simultaneously, including major, record-breaking floods, flash floods, and landslides, all of which caused severe loss of life and property, as well as extensive damage to dykes, reservoirs, and essential infrastructure. A Deputy Minister acknowledged that response measures to the historic flooding had remained largely reactive, forecasting of extreme rainfall and exceptional floods was still limited, and overall disaster resilience needed improvement.

The heavy rainfall on 30 September in Hanoi prompted discussion over the adequacy of urban drainage systems and infrastructure investment. Some experts observed that rapid urban expansion and the filling of former low-lying areas for construction – particularly in Hanoi and Thái Nguyên – had worsened flooding impacts. Associate Professor Nguyễn Ngọc Trực suggested that Hanoi should establish and implement a comprehensive urban flood risk management framework, both for the capital and for other flood-prone cities. The Hanoi People’s Committee directed agencies to review and expedite water supply and drainage projects, including the Liên Mạc Pumping Station; chairman Trần Sỹ Thanh stated that the flooding in Trung Giã and Đa Phúc communes served as a practical test for the operation of the two-tier local government model, which had come into effect nationwide on 1 July 2025.

== See also ==
- 2025 Central Vietnam floods
- Effects of Typhoon Yagi in Vietnam (2024)
- 2013 Southeast Asian floods
- 2019 Vietnam floods
- 2020 Central Vietnam floods
- 2025 Pacific typhoon season
