= Ái Quốc, Haiphong =

Coordinates: 20°57′02″N 106°22′39″E

Ái Quốc Phường Ái Quốc
- A building in Ái Quốc
- Interactive map of Ái Quốc
- Country: Vietnam
- Region: Red River Delta
- Municipality: Haiphong
- Established: June 16th 2025

Area
  - Total: 40.86 km^{2} (15.78 sq mi)

Population (2025)
  - Total: 56,251
  - Density: 1,377/km^{2} (3,566/sq mi)
- Time zone: UTC+7
- Administrative code: 10660
- Website: http://aiquoc.haiphong.gov.vn/

Ái Quốc is a ward in Haiphong, Vietnam. It is situated on the Red River Delta.

== Geography ==
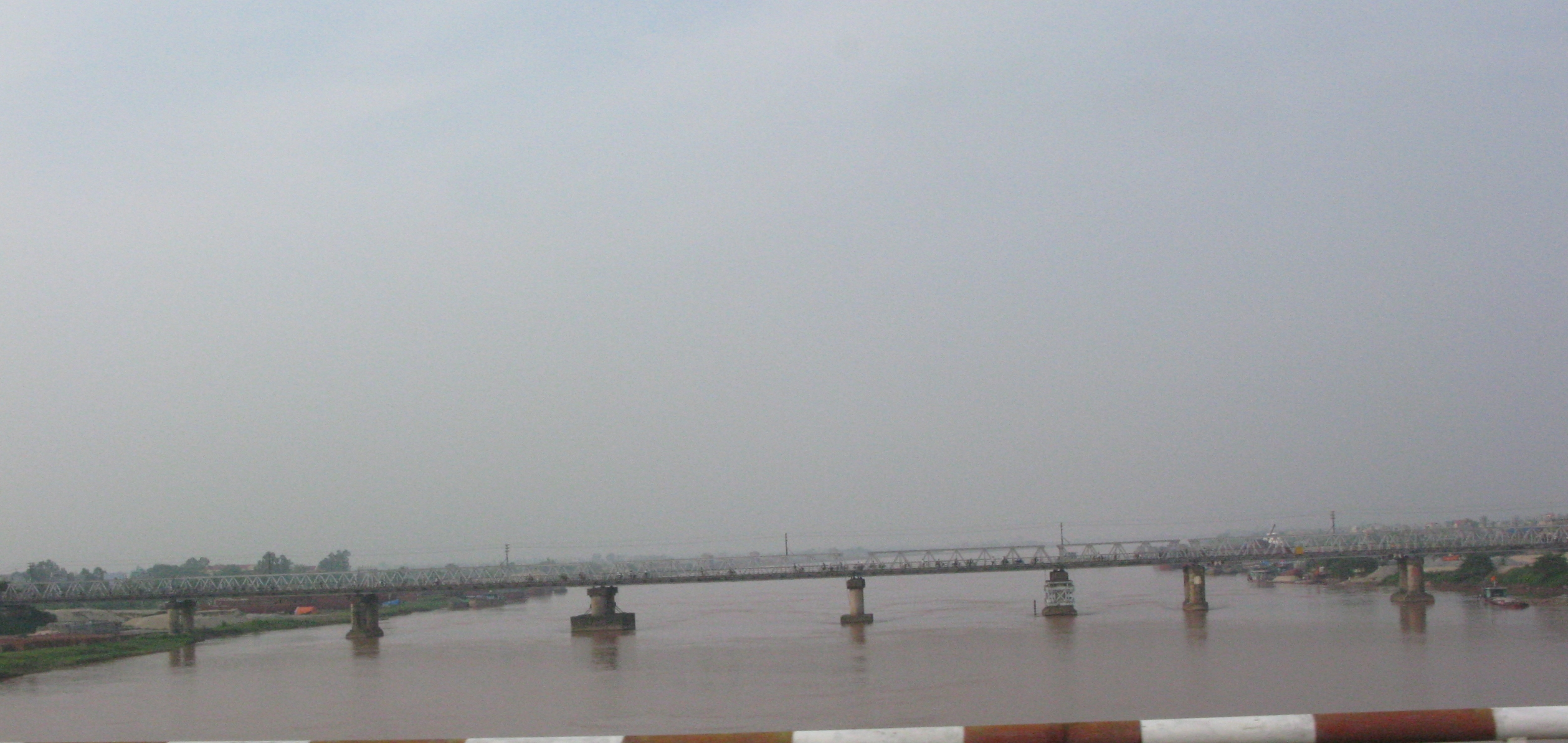
Phú Lương Bridge through the Thái Bình River, roughly 1.6 kilometers away from Ái Quốc.

- To the north, it borders An Phú.
- To the west, it borders Nam Đồng and Nam Sách.
- To the south, it borders Hà Tây.
- To the east, it borders Lai Khê and Hà Bắc.

It is roughly .43 kilometeres away from the Thái Bình River, which is part of the Thái Bình river system.

== History ==
On March 19, 2008, Ái Quốc, which used to be a commune was merged into Hải Dương.

On December 29, 2013, the Government of Vietnam issued Resolution No. 138/NQ-CP. which turned Ái Quốc commune into Ái Quốc ward.

On June 12, 2025, Hải Dương was integrated into Hải Phòng, which made Ái Quốc a ward of Hải Phòng.

On June 16, 2025, the Standing Committee of the National Assembly issued a resolution on the rearrangement of commune-level administrative units in Hải Phòng. The entire natural area and population size of Ái Quốc, Quyết Thắng and a part of the natural area of Hồng Lạc were rearranged into Ái Quốc.

== Transportation ==
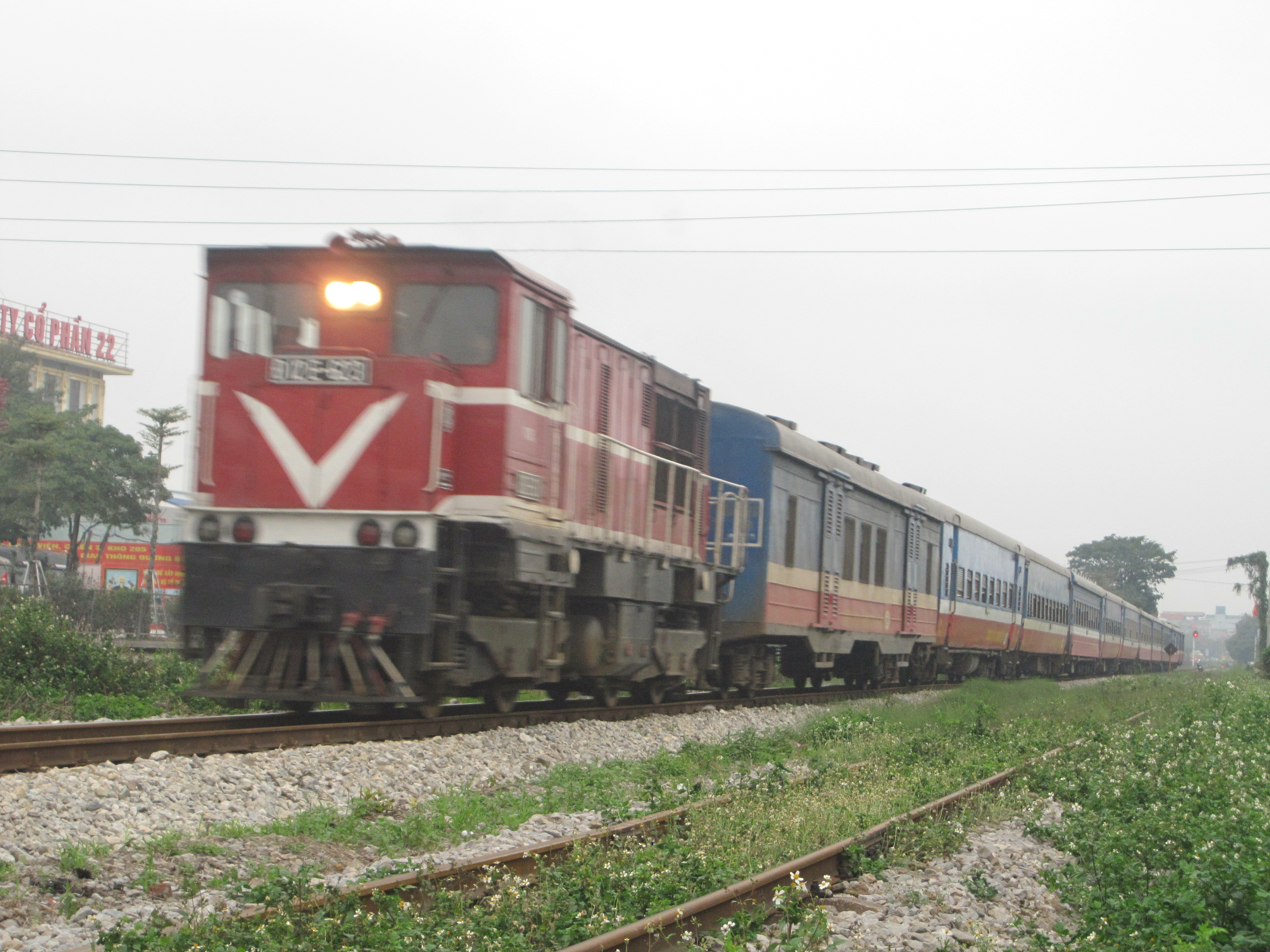
Hanoi-Hai Phong Railway

National Route 5, National Route 37, and the Hanoi-Hai Phong railway line runs through it.
