= Phan =

Phan may refer to:

- Phan (surname), a Vietnamese family name
- Phan District, Chiang Rai Province, Thailand
- Phan River, Bình Thuận Province, Vietnam
- Phan (tray), a tray with a pedestal, used often for ritual offerings
- Dan and Phil, an English entertainment and business duo
