= Rose Cao =

Vietnamese floral artist

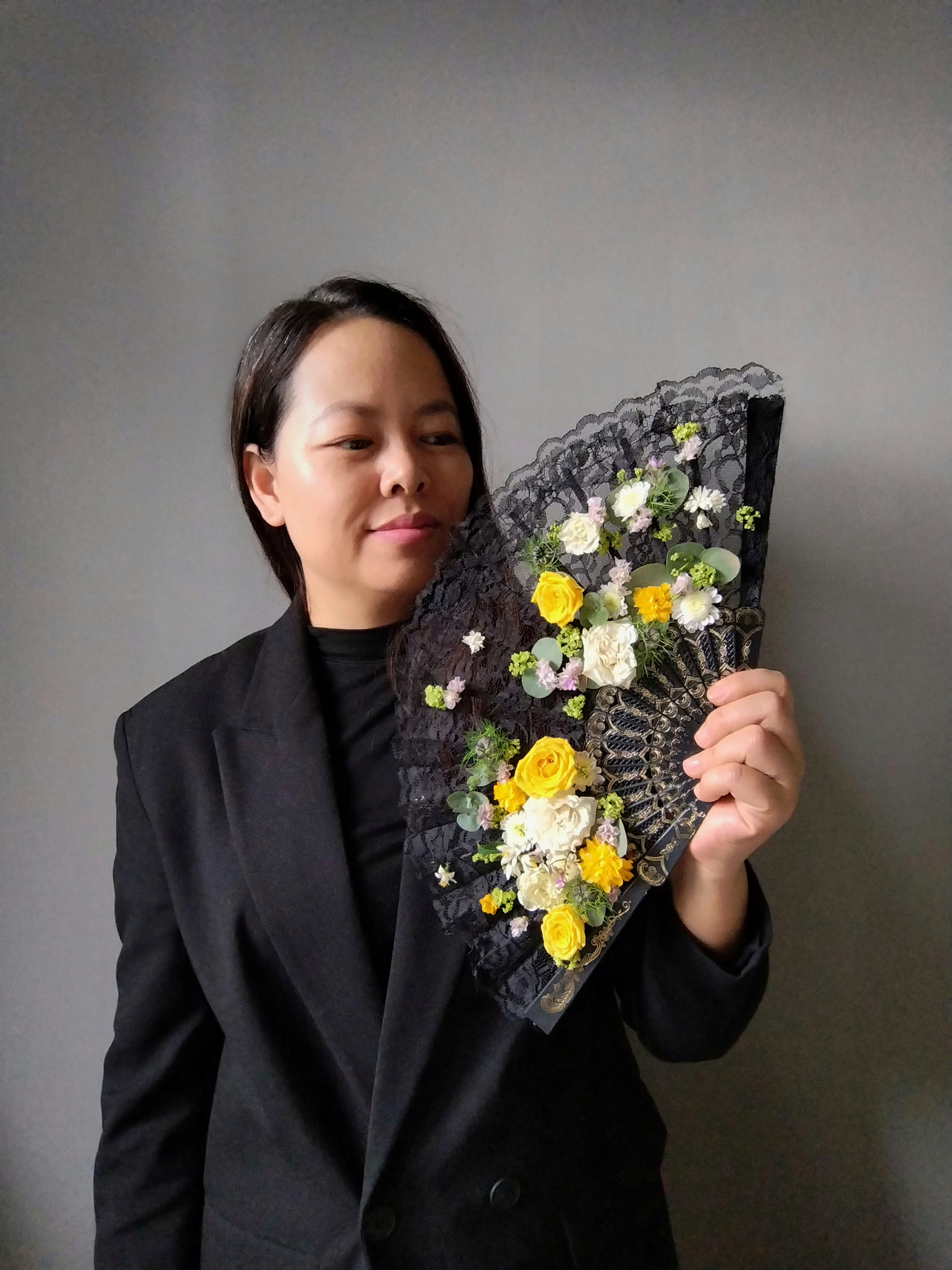
- Rose Cao
- Born: Cao Thi Huyen; 3 December 1986 (age 39); Thanh Hoa, Vietnam
- Education: Murdoch University
- Occupations: Floral artist, Floral designer, Educator, Author

Rose Cao (born Cao Thi Huyen, 3 December 1986, in Thanh Hoa, Vietnam) is a Vietnamese floral artist, educator and author. She was the first Vietnamese to win a prize at the Chelsea Flower Show and the Singapore Garden Festival.

== Early life ==
Rose Cao was born in Thanh Hoa City, Vietnam in 1986. Her mother started working at the age of 13, and inspired Cao with her resilience and work ethic. At the age of 17, Cao moved to Singapore to study. She earned a Bachelor of Commerce with a double major in Accounting and Finance from Murdoch University in 2014.

== Career ==
Before entering the floral industry, Cao worked at Schlumberger from 2012 to 2016 in various planning and procurement roles. She began studying floral design in 2014 at the Nobleman School of Floral Design in Singapore and officially transitioned into the field in November 2014. In 2017, Cao founded Rose Cao Floral Design, hosting workshops and events. During the COVID-19 pandemic, she opened an online floristry education platform.

Cao participated in the Singapore Garden Festival in Gardens by the Bay in 2016. Her design 'To Be' took one of the silver awards in the Floral Table Top Competition (the highest award in 2016). She was the first Vietnamese to achieve such an award in an international floral display competition. In 2023, Cao became the first Vietnamese to win a prize at the Chelsea Flower Show. Her design "Light Dance" won the silver award in the Floral Lamp Post category.

=== Charity ===
Rose organised a fundraising flower design demonstration to help victims of the 2025 Northern Vietnam floods. 40+ event participants donated over 32 million VND to the program.

== Publications ==
In May 2022, Cao published her bilingual (English and Vietnamese) book Hibiscus Collection – Step-by-Step Guide to Floral Design.

- Cao, Rose (2022). Hibiscus Collection – Step-by-Step Guide to Floral Design. Amazon. ISBN 979-8-83051-112-4.

== Personal life ==
Rose Cao lives in Serbia. She is married with two children.
