= List of regions of Vietnam =

The Vietnamese government often groups the various provinces and centrally-governed cities into three regions: Northern Vietnam, Central Vietnam, and Southern Vietnam. These regions can be further subdivided into six subregions, officially referred to as "socio-economic regions": the Northern Midland and Mountainous Regions, the Red River Delta, the North Central Coast, the South Central Coast and Central Highlands, Southeast Vietnam, and the Mekong Delta.

== List of regions and subregions ==
Regions of Vietnam
Region	Subregion ("Socio-economic" region)	Provinces	Area (km^{2})	Population	Density (people per km^{2})	Notes
Northern Vietnam (Bắc Bộ, Miền Bắc)	Northern Midland and Mountainous (Trung du và miền núi phía Bắc)	Cao Bằng; Điện Biên; Lai Châu; Lạng Sơn; Lào Cai; Phú Thọ; Thái Nguyên; Tuyên Quang; Sơn La	92,517.40	12,601,800	136.00	Located in northern Vietnam, sharing national borders with China and Laos. Contains geographical subregions:Northwest and Northeast
Northern Vietnam (Bắc Bộ, Miền Bắc)	Red River Delta (Đồng Bằng Sông Hồng)	Bắc Ninh^{ǂ}; Hà Nội^{ǂ}; Hải Phòng^{ǂ}; Hưng Yên; Ninh Bình; Quảng Ninh^{ǂ}	15,070.70	22,091,250	1,465.84	Contains densely-populated subdivisions in the Thái Bình river system and Red River system. The Red River Delta has the smallest area but highest population and population density of all regions.
Central Vietnam (Trung Bộ, Miền Trung)	North Central Coast (Bắc Trung Bộ)	Hà Tĩnh; Nghệ An; Quảng Trị; Thanh Hóa; Huế^{ǂ}	51,242.75	11,190,830	218.39	It contains the coastal provinces in the northern half of Vietnam's narrow central part. They all stretch from the coast in the east to Laos in the west.
Central Vietnam (Trung Bộ, Miền Trung)	South Central Coast and Central Highlands (Duyên hải Nam Trung Bộ và Tây Nguyên)	Đà Nẵng^{ǂ}; Đắk Lắk; Gia Lai; Khánh Hòa; Lâm Đồng; Quảng Ngãi	99,153.43	15,872,000	160.10	It contains the coastal and highlands provinces in the southern half of Vietnam's central part.
Southern Vietnam (Nam Bộ, Miền Nam)	Southeast (Đông Nam Bộ, Miền Đông)	Đồng Nai^{ǂ}; Ho Chi Minh City^{ǂ}; Tây Ninh	23,551.42	18,810,780	798.71	It contains the lowland parts of southern Vietnam north of the Mekong delta.
Southern Vietnam (Nam Bộ, Miền Nam)	Mekong Delta (Đồng Bằng Sông Cửu Long) or Southwest (Tây Nam Bộ, Miền Tây)	An Giang; Cà Mau; Cần Thơ^{ǂ}; Đồng Tháp; Vĩnh Long	40,922.58	17,432,120	425.98	It is Vietnam's southernmost region, mostly containing small but populous provinces in the Mekong delta. It is sometimes referred to as the Southwest region (Tây Nam Bộ, Miền Tây).

^{ǂ} Indicates a centrally-governed city (municipality).

== Table of provinces per region ==
Regions of Vietnam

Name	Capital (ward)	Population (2025)	Area (km^{2})
Northern Vietnam (Bắc Bộ)
Northern Midland and Mountainous (Trung du và miền núi phía Bắc)
Cao Bằng	Thục Phán	562,900	6,703.00
Lạng Sơn	Lương Văn Tri	820,600	8,307.30
Phú Thọ	Việt Trì	3,701,500	9,346.70
Thái Nguyên	Phan Đình Phùng	1,711,600	8,374.50
Tuyên Quang	Minh Xuân	1,748,200	13,795.50
Điện Biên	Điện Biên Phủ	667,400	9,548.00
Lai Châu	Tân Phong	501,200	9,068.70
Lào Cai	Yên Bái	1,675,700	13,255.10
Sơn La	Chiềng Cơi	1,341,200	14,108.90
Red River Delta (Đồng bằng sông Hồng)
Bắc Ninh (centrally-governed city)	Bắc Giang	3,572,400	4,713.80
Hưng Yên	Phố Hiến	3,235,200	2,637.800
Ninh Bình	Hoa Lư	3,843,800	3,946.10
Quảng Ninh (centrally-governed city)	Hạ Long	1,411,600	6,231.30
Hà Nội (centrally-governed city)	Hoàn Kiếm	8,857,500	3,359.80
Hải Phòng (centrally-governed city)	Thủy Nguyên	4,149,900	3,184.50
Central Vietnam (Trung Bộ)
North Central Coastal (Bắc Trung Bộ)
Hà Tĩnh	Thành Sen	1,335,100	5,994.30
Nghệ An	Trường Vinh	3,497,800	16,486.10
Quảng Trị	Đồng Hới	1,594,100	12,686.80
Thanh Hóa	Hạc Thành	3,771,800	11,111.20
Huế	Thuận Hóa	1,190,300	4,947.10
South Central Coast and Central Highlands (Duyên hải Nam Trung Bộ và Tây Nguyên)
Khánh Hòa	Nha Trang	1,898,500	8,706.80
Quảng Ngãi	Cẩm Thành	1,881,200	14,826.00
Đà Nẵng (centrally-governed city)	Hải Châu	2,856,400	11,870.30
Đắk Lắk	Buôn Ma Thuột	2,849,200	18,099.80
Gia Lai	Quy Nhơn	3,182,700	21,580.90
Lâm Đồng	Xuân Hương – Đà Lạt	3,356,400	24,239.10
Southern Vietnam (Nam Bộ)
Southeast Vietnam (Đông Nam Bộ)
Đồng Nai (centrally-governed city)	Trấn Biên	4,493,700	12,737.20
Tây Ninh	Long An	2,980,300	8,524.40
Ho Chi Minh City (centrally-governed city)	Saigon	13,803,800	6,796.90
Mekong River Delta (Đồng bằng sông Cửu Long)^{1}
An Giang	Rạch Giá	3,694,600	9,893.90
Cà Mau	Tân Thành	2,150,400	7,887.30
Đồng Tháp	Mỹ Tho	3,403,800	5,938.60
Vĩnh Long	Long Châu	3,379,600	6,875.90
Cần Thơ (centrally-governed city)	Ninh Kiều	3,224,900	6,361.00

1 – a.k.a. Southwest Vietnam (Tây Nam Bộ)

== See also ==
- Northern, Central and Southern Vietnam
- List of districts of Vietnam
- Municipalities of Vietnam
- Provinces of Vietnam
- Regions of Indonesia
- Regions of Thailand
