= 2025 Central Vietnam floods =

Natural disaster in Vietnam

- Cause: Record rainfalls due to the impacts of tropical cyclones Fengshen, Typhoon Koto, Kalmaegi and cold air.

Meteorological history
- Duration: 16 October – 6 December 2025

Flood
- Max. rainfall: 1,739.6 millimetres (68.5 in)

Overall effects
- Casualties: at least 219 deaths and missing
- Damage: $1.61 billion (2025 USD)
- Areas affected: Vietnam's South Central Coast and the Central Highlands

2025 Central Vietnam floods were a period of heavy rainfall and flooding that occurred in the central provinces of Vietnam from October 16, 2025, to 6 December. The event was caused by a combination of weather patterns, including a cold air mass, disturbances in the upper-level easterly winds, along with the influence of a low-pressure area formed from the remnants of Tropical Storm Fengshen, Typhoon Koto and the circulation of Typhoon Kalmaegi.

Prolonged heavy rainfall occurred across provinces from Quảng Trị to Khánh Hòa, with two major phases. The first phase took place from October 16 to November 9. A record 24-hour rainfall in Vietnam was recorded in Bach Ma from 7:00PM (UTC+7) in October 26 to 7:00PM in October 27 at 1739.6mm, and total rainfall from 25 to 30 October in this weather station was recorded at 4.161mm. It raised heavy flooding in Vietnam, some stations in Hue and Da Nang recorded historical flood peak. On the Bồ River at Phú Ốc, the flood peak exceeded the previous record set in 2020 three times within just one week.

As of November 5, 47 people were dead and eight others missing, with 130 others left injured. Damage in Da Nang was estimated at 837.312 billion dong (US$33.2 million), and in Quảng Ngãi province reached 1.924 trillion dong (US$76.32 million). In Lâm Đồng, damage by the flooding was estimated at 38 billion dong (US$1.5 million). Damage by flooding in Hue reached 3.27 trillion dong (US$129.7 million). As of November 13, at least 66 people are reported killed and missing following days of the first period of flooding and landslides, along with Typhoon Kalmaegi, in central Vietnam. Total damage by Fengshen and flooding in the first phase reached 9.8 trillion dong (US$390.9 million), damage by Kalmaegi and floods in Vietnam was estimated at 13.097 trillion dong (US$521.4 million),

The second phase began on November 15, with the center of flooding shifting to the South Central Coast. The Ba river in Đắk Lắk exceeded the historic flood peak, higher than the 1993 floods. Typhoon Koto made landfall in Khanh Hoa and brought heavy rainfall; the Cam Ly river exceeded the historic flood peak, higher than the 2019. In the second phase, at least 153 people are reported killed and missing and damage reached 17.311 trillion dong (US$689.1 million). As of December 22, damage in Lâm Đồng by Koto and flooding in early December reached 242 billion dong (US$9.6 million) and 2 people were dead.

== See also ==
- Tropical Storm Fengshen (2025)
- Typhoon Kalmaegi
- 2025 Northern Vietnam floods
- 2020 Central Vietnam floods
- November 1964 Vietnam floods
- 1999 Vietnamese floods
