= Bảo Định Canal =

Waterway in Vietnam

Coordinates: 10°26′37.8″N 106°22′9.0″E

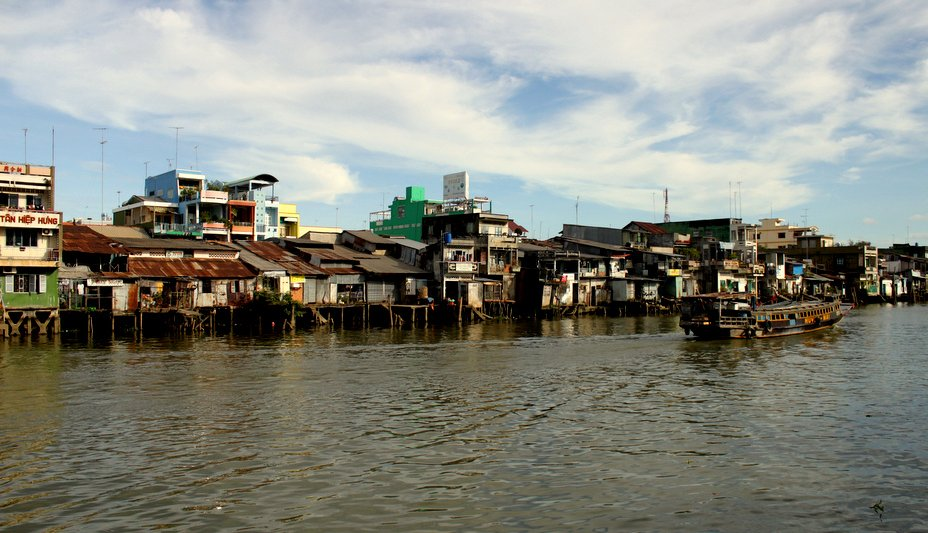
Waterfront houses in Mỹ Tho

The Bảo Định canal (kênh Bảo Định, Bảo Định Hà), also called the Bảo Định river (Bảo Định Giang, sông Bảo Định) is a part-natural, part-man made waterway in the Mekong Delta in Vietnam. It is in places also named the Vũng Gù canal (kênh Vũng Gù, (sông Vũng Gù).

The canal runs from the Vàm Cỏ Tay river at Tân An to the Tiền River at Mỹ Tho.

== History ==
The waterway first began to be manually improved in the rulership of Nguyễn Phúc Chu (1675–1725). The canal was substantially deepened and extended in the reign of Gia Long of Nguyễn dynasty , with 9,000 workers being mobilised to connect the two rivers around 1819.
