= Phó Đáy River =

River in Vietnam

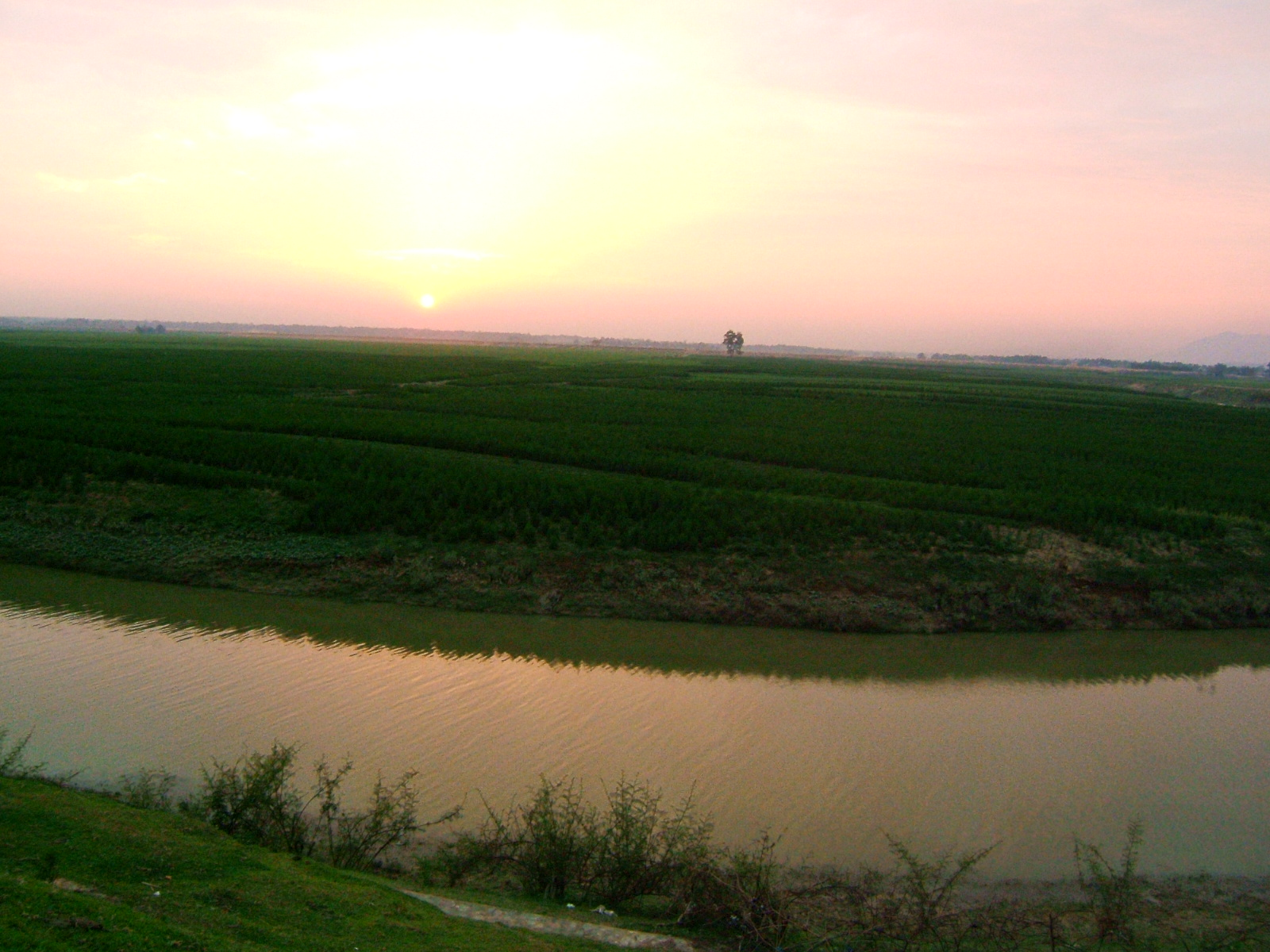
Picutre of Phó Đáy River - 2008

The Phó Đáy River (Vietnamese: Sông Phó Đáy) is a tributary of the Lô River in Northern Vietnam. It flows for 200 kilometres through Bắc Kạn Province, Tuyên Quang Province and Vĩnh Phúc Province.
