= Strong Monsoon Signal =

Weather Warning

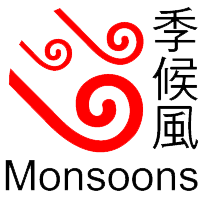
- Icon of Strong Monsoon Signal
- Traditional Chinese: 強烈季候風信號
- Simplified Chinese: 强烈季候风信号
Transcriptions
Standard Mandarin
- Hanyu Pinyin: qiángliè jìhòufēng xìnhào
Yue: Cantonese
- Yale Romanization: kèuhng liht gwai hauh fūng seun houh
- Jyutping: koeng4 lit6 gwai3 hau6 fung1 seon3 hou6

Black Ball
- Chinese: 黑球
- Literal meaning: Black Ball
Transcriptions
Standard Mandarin
- Hanyu Pinyin: hēiqiú
Yue: Cantonese
- Yale Romanization: hāk kàuh
- Jyutping: hak1 kau4

Old Signals

Day

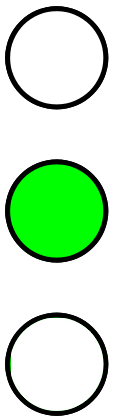
Night

Strong Monsoon Signal (Yue Chinese: 強烈季候風信號), commonly called Black Ball, is a weather warning issued by the Hong Kong Observatory when winds associated with the summer or winter monsoon are blowing in excess of or are expected to exceed 40 kilometres per hour near sea level anywhere in Hong Kong. Unlike the Tropical Cyclone Warning Signals, the signal does not have an upper limit, however, if the wind is unusually strong, the "Special Weather Tips" will be issued. Winter monsoon normally blows from the north or from the east while summer monsoon typically blows from the southwest. In very exposed places, monsoon winds may exceed 70 kilometres per hour. The signal may be issued when a tropical cyclone is moving further or departing from Hong Kong. (e.g. Tropical Storm Fengshen and Typhoon Kajiki)

The signal can be issued or in effect with other signals also in effect (such as Rainstorm Warning Signals, Thunderstorm Warning, Special Announcement on Flooding in the northern New Territories, Landslip Warning, Frost Warning, Fire Danger Warnings, Cold Weather Warning and Very Hot Weather Warning).

Except the Tropical Cyclone Warning Signals, this is because Tropical Cyclone Warning Signals are only issued when the strength of winds in Hong Kong is affected by a Tropical Cyclone, whereas the Strong Monsoon Signal is issued when Monsoons affect the strength of winds in Hong Kong. If both affect Hong Kong at the same time, the observatory will assess which affects the winds the most, for example the position of the tropical cyclone, the general wind direction in Hong Kong and the humidity, before issuing the relevant signal.

Usually if both affect Hong Kong at the same time, the observatory will issue the Strong Monsson Signal and will issue the Strong Wind Signal No. 3 as the Tropical Cyclone gets closer to Hong Kong. (e.g. Tropical Storm Fengshen,Tropical Storm Kompasu,Tropical Storm Lionrock).

== Issuance of Strong Monsoon Signal since 2000 ==
- Accurate as of 13 November 2026
- Denotates most issued since 2000

Year	Wind Direction								Total
Year	North	Northeast	East	Southeast	South	Southwest	West	Northwest	Total
2000	13	0	12	2	1	1	0	0	29
2001	9	3	3	4	0	0	0	0	19
2002	8	0	6	2	0	2	0	0	18
2003	8	1	12	2	0	2	0	0	25
2004	7	1	9	0	0	1	0	0	18
2005	7	0	10	1	0	1	0	0	19
2006	2	1	11	0	0	2	0	0	16
2007	3	1	9	0	0	2	0	0	15
2008	5	0	10	1	2	2	0	0	20
2009	10	2	15	0	0	1	0	0	28
2010	6	0	8	0	1	0	0	0	15
2011	9	4	8	0	0	0	0	0	21
2012	9	0	12	2	0	2	0	0	25
2013	5	2	15	2	0	1	0	0	25
2014	6	1	11	2	0	0	0	0	20
2015	4	0	13	1	0	1	0	0	19
2016	4	0	12	0	0	1	0	0	17
2017	5	3	12	1	1	2	0	0	24
2018	6	0	10	1	0	0	0	0	17
2019	5	1	14	0	0	0	0	0	20
2020	3	1	15	0	0	0	0	0	19
2021	6	0	8	0	0	0	0	0	14
2022	5	1	12	2	0	1	0	0	21
2023	8	0	8	1	0	0	0	0	17
2024	5	0	9	0	0	2	0	0	16
2025	11	1	10	0	0	1	0	0	23
2026	4	0	9	1	0	2	0	0	16
Total (Note: Since 1 January 2000)	173	23	283	25	5	27	0	0	536
Average	6.407	0.851	10.481	0.925	0.185	1	0	0	19.851

== See also ==
- Hong Kong tropical cyclone warning signals
- Hong Kong rainstorm warning signals
- Hong Kong Observatory
