= Ministry of Transport (Vietnam) =

Former government ministry of Vietnam

Socialist Republic of Vietnam Ministry of Transport
- Bộ Giao thông Vận tải

Ministry overview
- Formed: 28 August 1945
- Preceding Ministry: Ministry of Transport and Public Works (1945–1954) Ministry of Transport and Post (1954–1960) Ministry of Transport (1960–1990) Ministry of Transport and Post (1990–1992) Ministry of Transport (1992-present)
- Dissolved: 18 February 2025
- Superseding Ministry: Ministry of Construction
- Jurisdiction: Government of Vietnam
- Headquarters: 80 Tran Hung Dao Street, Tran Hung Dao Ward, Hoan Kiem District, Hanoi
- Annual budget: 43.602 billion VND (2018)
- Minister responsible: Nguyễn Văn Thắng
- Deputy Minister responsible: Nguyễn Xuân Sang Lê Đình Thọ Nguyễn Duy Lâm Lê Anh Tuấn Nguyễn Danh Huy
- Website: mt.gov.vn

The Ministry of Transport (MOT, Vietnamese: Bộ Giao thông Vận tải - Bộ GTVT, lit. 'Ministry of Traffic and Transport') was the government ministry responsible for governing rail transport, road transport, water transport, maritime transport, and air transport in Vietnam. The Ministry was located in Hoan Kiem, Hanoi.

On 18 February 2025, the Ministry of Transport merged with the Ministry of Construction as part of the 2024–2025 Vietnamese government reorganisation.

== Organisation ==
The technical, administrative and educational work of the Ministry is organised into various agencies, departments, schools and enterprises, including:

=== Specialised agencies ===
- Department for Roads of Vietnam
- Vietnam Inland Waterways Administration
- Vietnam National Maritime Bureau
- Vietnam Register: governs seagoing vessels, rivergoing vessels, offshore installations, including petroleum industry rigs, industrial installations and motor vehicles of Vietnam
- Transport Construction Quality Control and Management Bureau

=== Administrative agencies ===
==== Industrial research institutes ====
- Research Institute for Transport Science and Technology (RITST)
- Transport Development and Strategy Institute (TDSI)

==== Schools ====
- Vietnam Aviation Academy (VAA)
- Vietnam Maritime University (VINAMARU)
- Ho Chi Minh City University of Transportation (UT-HCMC)
- University of Transport Technology (UTT)
- School for Training Cards and Civil Servants of the Transport Sector
- Transport College
- Transport Technical and Professional School No. 1
- Transport Technical and Professional School No. 2
- Transport Technical and Professional School No. 3
- Transport Technical and Professional School for Cuu Long Delta Area
- Transport Vocational School Area I
- Transport Vocational School Area II
- Transport Vocational School Area III

==== Other ====
- Transport Health Department
- Transport Information Centre
- Transport Newspaper
- Transport Journal
- Transport Publishing House

=== Enterprises ===
- Thang Long Construction Corporation
- Civil Engineering Construction Corporation No. 1 (CIENCO 1)
- Civil Engineering Construction Corporation No. 4 (CIENCO 4)
- Civil Engineering Construction Corporation No. 5 (CIENCO 5)
- Civil Engineering Construction Corporation No. 6 (CIENCO 6)
- Civil Engineering Construction Corporation No. 8 (CIENCO 8)
- Transport Industry Corporation (TRANSINCO)
- Vietnam Waterway Construction Corporation (VINAWACO)
- Transport Engineering Design Incorporation (TEDI)
- NguyenMy Co., Ltd, International Freight Forwarder
- Northern Inland Waterway Transport Corporation
- Southern Inland Waterway Transport Corporation
- Trading and Engineering Construction Corporation (TRAENCO)
- Transport Service Company No. 2
- Vietnam Freight Forwarding Company (VINAFCO)
- Saigon Transport Service Company
- Labor Oversea Deployment Corporation (LOD)
- Vietnam Shipping and Chartering Corporation (VIETFRACHT)
- Transport Mechanical Corporation No. 2
- Transport Material Engineering and Construction Corporation (TRANSMECCO)
- Southern Transport Engineering Design Incorporation (TEDI SOUTH)
- Transport Import-Export and Investment Cooperation Corporation (TRACIMEXCO)

== List of ministers ==
This is a list of ministers of transport of the Socialist Republic of Vietnam and their tenure

- August 1945-March 1945 : Đào Trọng Kim
- March 1945- September 1955: Trần Đăng Khoa
- September 1955 – 1957: Nguyễn Văn Trân
- 1957–1960: Nguyễn Hữu Mai
- 1960– March 1974: Phan Trọng Tuệ
- March 1974 – 1976: Dương Bạch Liên
- 1976–February 1980: Phan Trọng Tuệ
- February 1980– April 1982: Đinh Đức Thiện
- April 1982– June 1986: Đồng Sĩ Nguyên
- June 1986– November 1996: Bùi Danh Lưu
- November 1996 – 2002: Lê Ngọc Hoàn
- 2002– June 2006: Đào Đình Bình
- June 2006– 3 August 2011: Hồ Nghĩa Dũng
- 3 August 2011– 6 February 2016: Đinh La Thăng
- 6 February 2016– 25 October 2017: Nguyễn Hồng Trường
- 26 October 2017– 21 October 2022: Nguyễn Văn Thể
- 21 October 2022– present: Nguyễn Văn Thắng

== See also ==
- Government of Vietnam
- Transport in Vietnam
