= Kinh Thầy River =

River in Vietnam

- Native name: Sông Kinh Thầy

Location
- Country: Vietnam

Physical characteristics
- Source: Thái Bình River
  - location: Lâu Khê, Hiệp Cát commune, Hải Dương province
- Mouth: Cấm River
  - location: Hợp Thành commune, Thủy Nguyên city, Haiphong
- Length: 44.5 km (27.7 mi)

Kinh Thầy River is a river of Hải Dương Province in northeast Vietnam. It is almost 45 kilometers long.
