= Hà Bắc, Haiphong =

Hà Bắc
- Commue
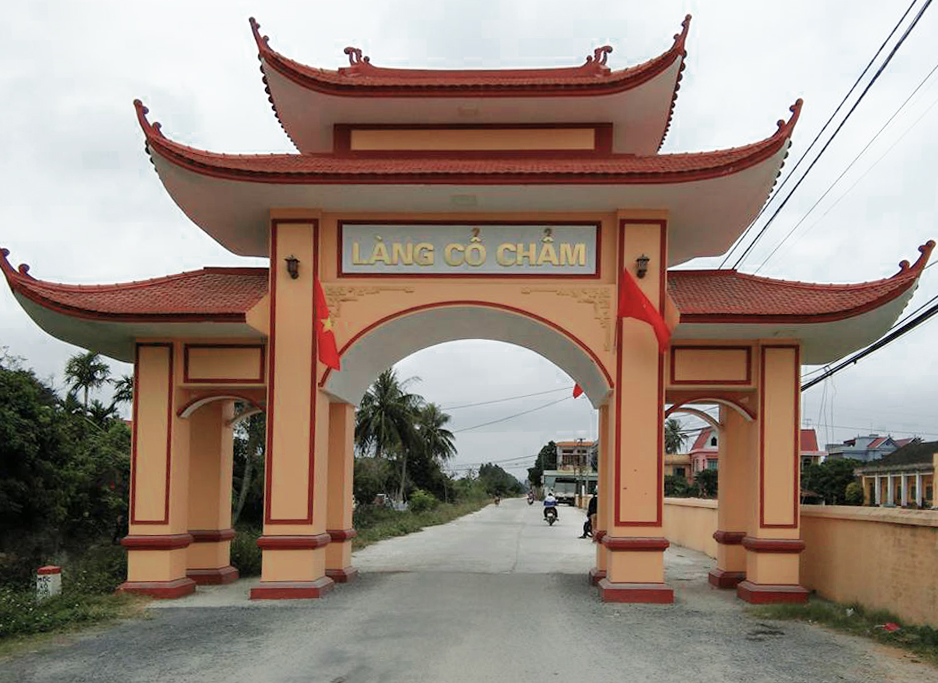
- Entrance gate of Cổ Chẩm Village
- Interactive map of Hà Bắc
- Coordinates: 20°56′35″N 106°25′00″E
- Country: Vietnam
- Region: Red River Delta
- City: Hai Phong
- Established: 16 June 2025

Area
  - Total: 26.06 km^{2} (10.06 sq mi)

Population (2025)
  - Total: 36,429
  - Density: 1,397/km^{2} (3,620/sq mi)
- Website: habac.haiphong.gov.vn

Hà Bắc is a commune in Hải Phòng, Vietnam.

On October 24, 2024, merge Việt Hồng and Cẩm Chế communes into a new commune name of Cẩm Việt.

On June 16, 2025, the National Assembly Standing Committee issued a Resolution on the arrangement of commune-level administrative units in Hai Phong city in 2025. Accordingly, the entire natural area and population size of Tân Việt commune, part of the natural area and population size of Cẩm Việt commune and Hồng Lạc commune will be arranged into a new commune called Hà Bắc commune.
