= Bản Thín River =

River in Vietnam and China

Coordinates: 21.76667°N 106.98333°E

Bản Thín (Vietnamese: Sông Bản Thín) is a tributary of the Kỳ Cùng River. It originates in the high mountains of Guangxi, China, and joins the Kỳ Cùng River in Qu Xa commune in Lộc Bình District of Lạng Sơn Province in northeastern Vietnam. The river is 52 kilometres (32 mi) long and has a catchment area of 320 square kilometres (120 sq mi).
