= Trà Bồng River =

River in Vietnam

The Trà Bồng River (Vietnamese: Sông Trà Bồng) is a river of Vietnam. It flows through Quảng Ngãi Province for 70 kilometres.
