= Tropical Storm Fengshen (2025) =

Pacific severe tropical storm in 2025

Severe Tropical Storm Fengshen (Ramil)
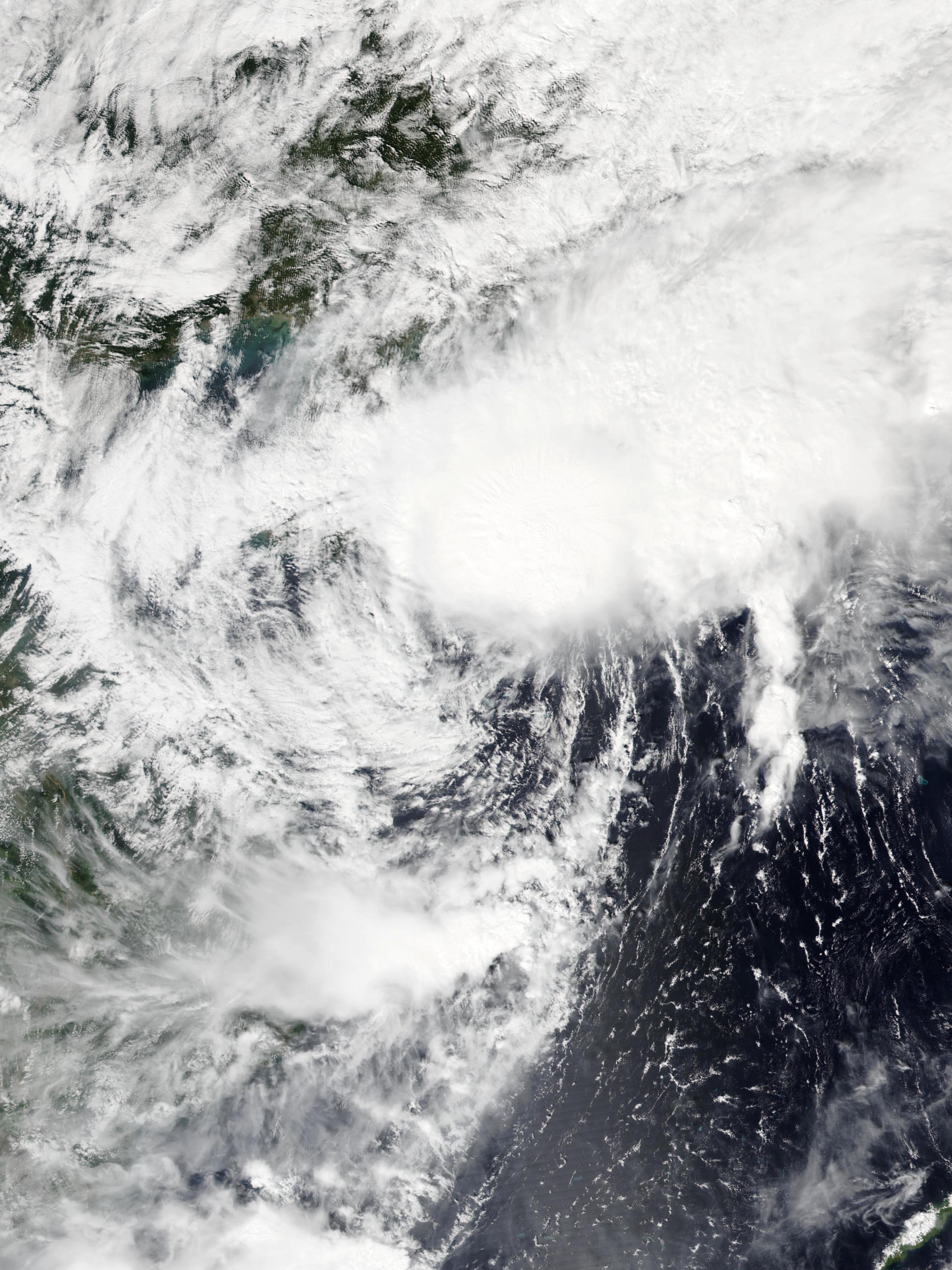
- Fengshen near peak intensity over the South China Sea on October 21

Meteorological history
- Formed: October 15, 2025
- Dissipated: October 23, 2025

Severe tropical storm
- 10-minute sustained (JMA)
- Highest winds: 95 km/h (60 mph)
- Lowest pressure: 990 hPa (mbar); 29.23 inHg

Tropical storm
- 1-minute sustained (SSHWS/JTWC)
- Highest winds: 100 km/h (65 mph)
- Lowest pressure: 988 hPa (mbar); 29.18 inHg

Overall effects
- Fatalities: 54
- Injuries: 134
- Missing: 10
- Damage: $391 million (2025 USD)
- Areas affected: Philippines; especially Catanduanes, Quezon and Panay; Taiwan; South China; Vietnam
- Part of the 2025 Pacific typhoon season

Severe Tropical Storm Fengshen, (Note: The name Fengshen (Mandarin: 风神, [fɤŋ˥ ʂən˧˥]) was contributed by China and literally means "God of wind" in Mandarin.) known in the Philippines as Tropical Storm Ramil, was a weak tropical cyclone which impacted Luzon in the Philippines and eventually affected Central Vietnam as a Tropical Depression after traversing the South China Sea in mid-October 2025. Fengshen, which was the twenty-fourth named storm of the 2025 Pacific typhoon season, was first monitored by the Japan Meteorological Agency (JMA) on October 12 as a tropical depression before subsequently being downgraded to a low-pressure area three days later, prompting the JMA to cease advisories, although the Joint Typhoon Warning Center (JTWC) continued to monitor it.

On October 16, the JMA reissued advisories as it moved into the Philippine Area of Responsibility (PAR), where it was assigned the local name Ramil by the Philippine Atmospheric, Geophysical and Astronomical Services Administration (PAGASA). Although the cyclone continued to intensify, the presence of dry air since limited its potential for further development. It made landfall four times in the Luzon area between October 17 and 19 before reemerging over the South China Sea, where it peaked as a severe tropical storm before gradually weakened and dissipating off the coast of Vietnam on October 23.

Fengshen generated extensive flooding and landslides in both the Philippines and Vietnam that left at least 54 people dead and ten others missing.

== Meteorological history ==
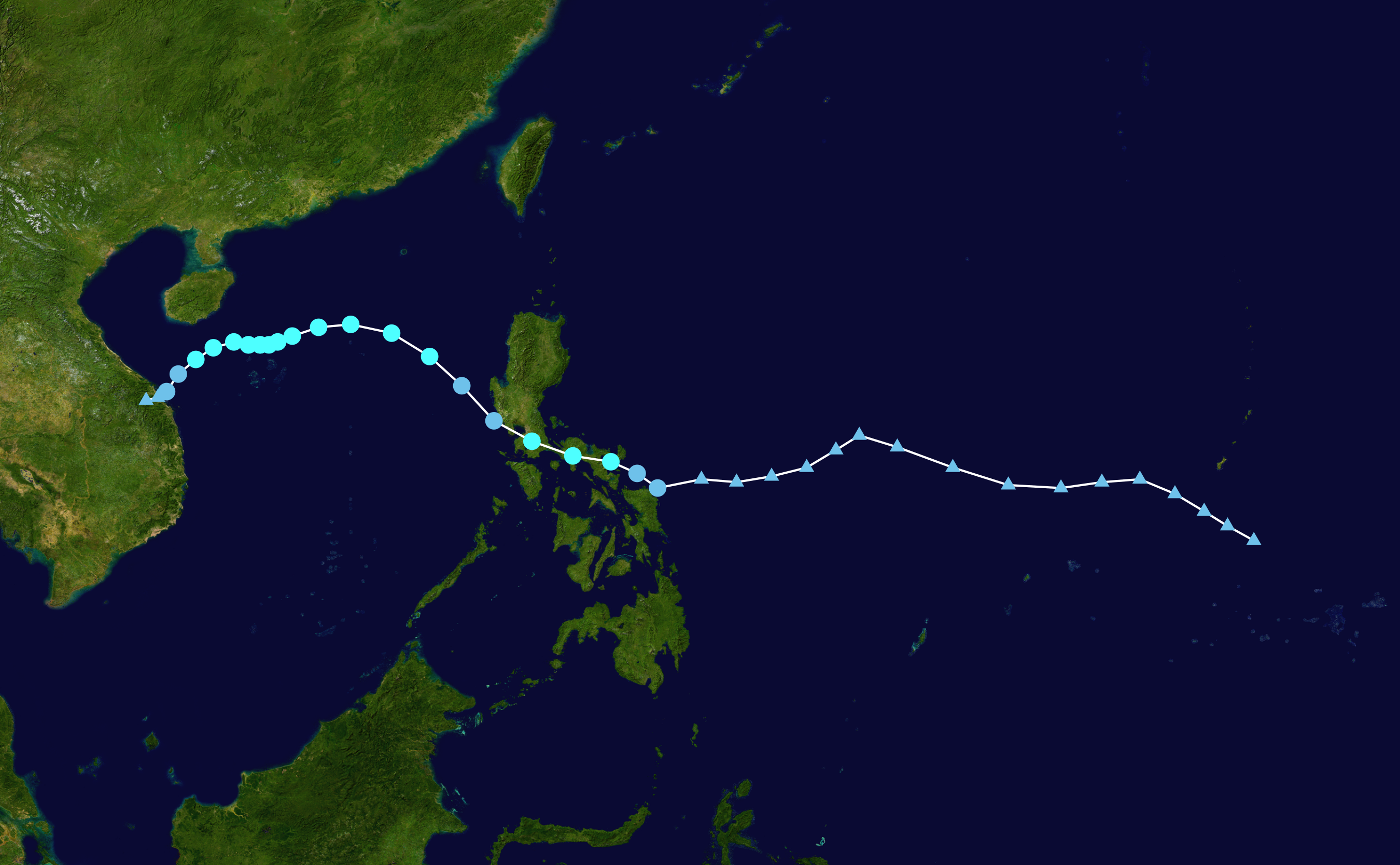
Map plotting the storm's track and intensity, according to the Saffir–Simpson scale Map key Saffir–Simpson scale Tropical depression (≤38 mph, ≤62 km/h) Tropical storm (39–73 mph, 63–118 km/h) Category 1 (74–95 mph, 119–153 km/h) Category 2 (96–110 mph, 154–177 km/h) Category 3 (111–129 mph, 178–208 km/h) Category 4 (130–156 mph, 209–251 km/h) Category 5 (≥157 mph, ≥252 km/h) Unknown Storm type Tropical cyclone Subtropical cyclone Extratropical cyclone, remnant low, tropical disturbance, or monsoon depression

On October 12, the JMA began tracking a tropical depression that had formed near 5°N 148°E. The JTWC followed later that day, noting poorly organized convection concentrated along the southern periphery of the system. The depression was situated in a moderately favorable environment, characterized by very warm sea surface temperatures, moderate equatorward outflow, and low vertical wind shear. However, within a few hours, the JMA assessed that the system had weakened into a low-pressure area and subsequently discontinued advisories on October 15. The JTWC continued monitoring the disturbance as it passed south of Guam, with satellite imagery revealing a wave-like structure and no defined low-level circulation center (LLCC), despite the system remaining in a conducive environment.

On October 16, the JMA reissued advisories and resumed tracking the system as it moved westward toward the eastern Philippines. The disturbance entered the Philippine Area of Responsibility (PAR) at 15:00 PHT (07:00 UTC), and was assigned the local name Ramil early the following day. Satellite imagery indicated a broad LLCC consolidating within persistent convection. A Tropical Cyclone Formation Alert (TCFA) was issued at 03:00 UTC, indicating a high probability of further development. Although the system was supported by high sea surface temperatures and weak vertical wind shear, the presence of dry air in the surrounding environment limited its intensification, resulting in neutral development conditions. The system continued moving westward along the southern edge of a subtropical ridge.

At 18:00 UTC on October 17, the JMA upgraded the system to a tropical storm, assigning it the international name Fengshen, due to favorable environmental conditions promoting further development. The JTWC began issuing advisories at 03:00 UTC on October 18, classifying Fengshen as a tropical depression and assigning it the identifier 30W. Convection obscuring the center suggested a consolidating system, though the LLCC remained weakly defined. Fengshen slightly weakened as it approached Northern Samar, making landfall near Gubat, Sorsogon around 16:00 PHT (08:00 UTC). Shortly after landfall, the JTWC reported a complex structure, indicating a tilted vortex and the potential presence of multiple circulation centers. The LLCC was located off the northeastern coast of Samar. Despite favorable environmental conditions, interaction with land and a fragile vortex hindered further intensification. Despite this, the JTWC said the conditions became favorable six hours later and would be highly favorable if not for the proximity to land. The agency also upgraded the cyclone into a tropical storm at 15:00 UTC that same day. The storm then tracked northwestwards, crossing inland through Bicol Region. The JTWC reported that the LLCC was fully obscured with a poorly organized structure, containing fragmented bands. These conditions, among other factors gave the system a marginally unfavorable environment. The next day, the storm made landfall in Alabat at 03:00 PHT (19:00 UTC the previous day) and later in Mauban on 07:30 PHT (23:30 UTC the previous day). Three hours later, the system resurfaced over Manila Bay before it made a fourth landfall at Samal, Bataan around 12:30 PHT (04:30 UTC). The JTWC also indicated that the system had improved banding wrapping into the LLCC with convection which has begun to consolidate; terrain interaction still caused the system to have an unfavorable environment. Shortly after, the JTWC reported that the system was primed for rapid intensification, yet the LLCC was weakly defined. At 15:00 UTC on October 19, the system was downgraded into a tropical depression by the JTWC but was again upgraded six hours later due to its farther distance from land. The storm rapidly consolidated with deep convection in a much favorable environment. Fengshen then tracked westwards due to a subtropical steering ridge to the northwest of the system. At 03:00 JST (18:00 UTC), Fengshen peaked as a severe tropical storm as it moves westwards. Fengshen then began to gradually weaken as dry air and southwesterly windshear hindered its development. It eventually dissipated off the coast of Vietnam on October 23.

== Preparations ==
=== Philippines ===
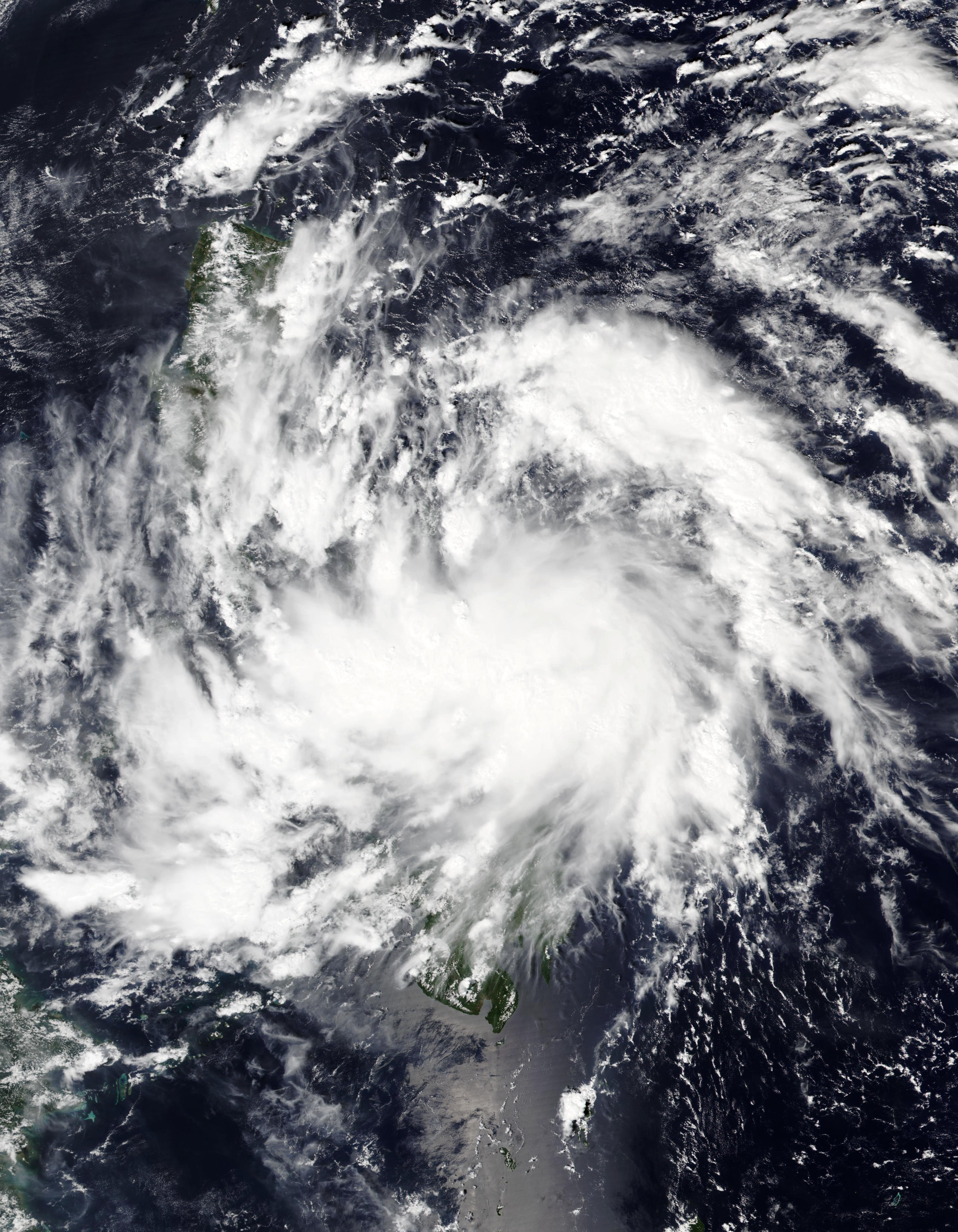
Tropical Storm Fengshen approaching the Philippines on October 18

The Philippine Coast Guard (PCG) suspended sea travel in the Bicol Region, while the region's PCG district was placed on heightened alert. The district activated two deployable response groups to Camarines Sur and Camarines Norte. Face-to-face classes in the province of Albay were suspended by order of Governor Noel Rosal. The provincial government later ordered preemptive evacuations, which were carried out in areas such as Pio Duran. In affected areas, residents set up temporary shelters, including tents in Barangay Caratagan, Pio Duran.

In Camarines Sur, the Provincial Disaster Risk Reduction and Management Council (PDRRMC) raised the alert level to red, prompting local authorities to intensify monitoring and emergency operations. The PDRRMC in Catanduanes prepared food and relief supplies, monitored the cyclone's approach, and suspended classes throughout the province while 9,000 people in the province evacuated to higher ground. The Land Transportation Office (LTO) in Bicol advised the public to avoid non-essential land travel. The National Grid Corporation of the Philippines (NGCP) initiated preparations to ensure minimal impact on power infrastructure. Meanwhile, the Bicol regional police activated its emergency response teams in anticipation of the storm's effects, with a total of 1,328 personnel placed on standby. The Department of Health raised a code white alert, monitoring the accessibility of medicines and equipment. On October 18, 41 class suspensions, all in Calabarzon, were recorded. The next day, two more class suspensions were recorded in Catanduanes. A total of 22,311 individuals evacuated: 366 of them were in Calabarzon while the rest were from Albay, Catanduanes, and Masbate.

==== Highest Tropical Cyclone Wind Signal ====
TCWS#	Luzon	Visayas	Mindanao
2	Aurora, Southeastern Portion of Isabela, Southern Portion of Nueva Vizcaya, Southeastern Portion of Quirino, Central and Southern Portions of Benguet, Central and Southern Portions of La Union, Pangasinan, Northern Portion of Bataan, Bulacan, Nueva Ecija, Pampanga, Tarlac, Northern and Central Portions of Zambales, Northern and Central Portions of Metro Manila, Northern Portion of Laguna, Northern and Central Portions of Rizal, Northern and Eastern Portions of Quezon, Polillo Islands, Camarines Norte, Catanduanes, Eastern Portion of Albay, Northern and Eastern Portions of Camarines Sur, Northeastern Portion of Sorsogon	Northern Portion of Northern Samar	None
1	Babuyan Islands, Cagayan, Rest of Isabela, Rest of Nueva Vizcaya, Rest of Quirino, Abra, Apayao, Rest of Benguet, Ifugao, Kalinga, Mountain Province, Ilocos Norte, Ilocos Sur, Rest of La Union, Rest of Bataan, Rest of Zambales, Rest of Metro Manila, Batangas, Cavite, Rest of Laguna, Rest of Rizal, Rest of Quezon, Lubang Islands, Marinduque, Occidental Mindoro, Oriental Mindoro, Romblon, Rest of Albay, Burias Island, Rest of Camarines Sur, Northern and Central Portions of Masbate, Rest of Sorsogon, Ticao Island	Northern Portion of Eastern Samar, Northern Portion of Samar, Rest of Northern Samar	None

=== Taiwan ===
The Extremely Heavy Rain Advisory was issued for New Taipei, Taipei and Yilan on 20 October under the combined effects of the northeast monsoon and Fengshen. Due to the state of barrier lakes and the heavy rain, 991 people were evacuated on 20 October from Hualien, New Taipei and Taipei.

=== Hong Kong ===
The Hong Kong Observatory (HKO) started warning members of the public as early as October 15 with regards of the forthcoming combined effect of the northeast monsoon and the tropical cyclone. The Strong Monsoon Signal‌ was hoisted at 22:50 HKT (14:50 UTC) on 19 October and was replaced with the Strong Wind Signal No. 3 at 17:20 HKT (09:20 UTC) the following day The Strong Monsoon Signal was reissued on 21 October at 18:21 HKT (10:21 UTC) and was canceled at 07:45 HKT (23:45 UTC) on 24 October.

=== Macau ===
The Strong Monsoon Signal‌ was hoisted at 00:00 MST on 20 October (16:00 UTC). and was replaced by the No. 3 Signal at 19:00 MST (11:00 UTC). The Strong Monsoon Signal was reissued at 17:00 MST (09:00 UTC) the next day and cancelled 3 days later at 05:00 MST.

== Impact and aftermath ==
=== Philippines ===
Within 24 hours, Fengshen generated 400.7 mm (15.78 in) of rain in Guiuan, Eastern Samar and 365.5 mm (14.39 in) of rain in Roxas City, which was greater than the monthly average in those areas. The PCG in Bicol reported that 757 passengers were stranded in the region along with 108 rolling cargoes and five vessels on October 17. The next day, 3,239 passengers were stranded nationally while 12 seaports in Calabarzon were shut down. Floods were caused in Iloilo and Catanduanes. Two transmission lines in Quezon were unavailable. A 23-year-old woman drowned after slipping in a creek in Capiz. Another death was recorded in Roxas City when a 44-year-old man got swept away by floodwaters. A family of five died when a tree fell in their house in Pitogo, Quezon. The total number of deaths was seven; two from Western Visayas and five from Calabarzon. Two individuals were declared missing. Around 375 classrooms were damaged, of which 118 were destroyed. Total damages was amounted to ₱11.7 million (US$199.1 thousand) from Fengshen.

Thirty-three residents in flooded areas in Roxas City were rescued. A state of calamity was declared in the city. Water levels in Bansud, Oriental Mindoro, were inspected by local officials while officials in Capiz did the same. The Department of Social Welfare and Development of Romblon prepared 25,000 food packs for affected communities.

=== Vietnam ===
The remmants of Fengshen, combined with cold air and ITCZ, brought heavy rainfall in Vietnam from October 22. A record 24-hour rainfall in Vietnam was recorded in Bach Ma from 7:00PM (UTC+7) in October 26 to 7:00PM in October 27 at 1739.6mm, and total rainfall from 25 to 30 October in this weather station was recorded at 4.161mm. It raised heavy flooding in Vietnam, some stations in Hue and Da Nang recorded historical flood peak.

As of November 5, damage in Da Nang was estimated at 837.312 billion dong (US$33.2 million), and in Quảng Ngãi province reached 1.924 trillion dong (US$76.32 million). In Lâm Đồng, damage by the flooding was estimated at 38 billion dong (US$1.5 million). 47 people were dead and eight others missing, with 130 others left injured. Damage by flooding in Hue reached 3.27 trillion dong (US$129.7 million). Total damage by the flooding in Central Vietnam was estimated at 9.85 trillion (US$390.9 million).

== See also ==
- Weather of 2025
- Tropical cyclones in 2025
- List of tropical cyclones near the Equator
