= Gò Công River =

River in Vietnam

The Gò Công River (Vietnamese: Sông Gò Công) is a river of Vietnam. The river is approximately 16 kilometres long, from the Vàm Cỏ Đông River to the center of Gò Công town. It flows through Tiền Giang Province for 12 kilometres.
