= La Tinh River =

River in Vietnam

The La Tinh River (Vietnamese: Sông La Tinh) is a river of Vietnam. It flows for 54 kilometres through Bình Định Province.
