= Vietnam Inland Waterways Administration =

Government agency in Vietnam

Vietnam Inland Waterways Administration (VIWA, Vietnamese: Cục Đường thuỷ nội địa Việt Nam) is the government agency of the Ministry of Transport that governs and maintains the ports, rivers, canals and navigable lakes of Vietnam. The current General Director is Assistant Professor D., People's Teacher Trần Đắc Sửu; VIWA is located in Hanoi.

As an organization, VIWA has:

- A board of directors;
- 15 River Management stations and joint stock companies;
- 4 Port authorities;
- 3 Training schools;
- Inspection groups;
- A magazine - Sail Magazine;
- A project management unit.

== River management ==
VIWA has jurisdiction of over 6,000 km of riverways, operating 15 stations and over 140 substations throughout the country. VIWA maintains over 14,000 navigation aids on Vietnam's rivers. Principal riverways under VIWA's purview include the Red River / Thái Bình Province area in the north, and the Mekong River system in the south.

== Ports ==
=== River ports ===
VIWA governs 77 ports in Vietnam, including 33 river ports. It manages five of them, all in the north: Hai Phong, Ninh Bình, Bắc Ninh, Việt Trì and Hòa Bình.

=== Seaports ===
VIWA currently maintains port authorities for four seaports:

- Port Authority 1 at Hai Phong
- Port Authority 2 at Hanoi
- Port Authority 3 at Ho Chi Minh City
- Port Authority 4 at Cần Thơ

== Training schools ==
VIWA operates three vocational schools:

- Inland Waterway School 1 at Nam Dong Village, in Nam Sách District of Hải Dương Province
- Inland Waterway School 2 at Ho Chi Minh City
- Inland Waterway Technical Worker School at Hai Phong

== See also ==
- Inland waterway
- Transport in Vietnam
- Port authority
- Port operator
