= Cà Ty River =

River in Vietnam

Coordinates: 10.9319°N 108.0933°E

The Cà Ty River (Vietnamese: Sông Cà Ty) is a river of Bình Thuận Province, Vietnam.

On April 6, 2024, an individual residing in the Bac Lieu Province has put forth a claim asserting detailed knowledge regarding the whereabouts of approximately three tons of gold, purportedly concealed by the Imperial Japanese military within the Cà Ty river. This individual has initiated formal proceedings by applying for permission from the local governing authorities to commence retrieval efforts aimed at recovering this treasure.
