= Cầu River =

River in Vietnam

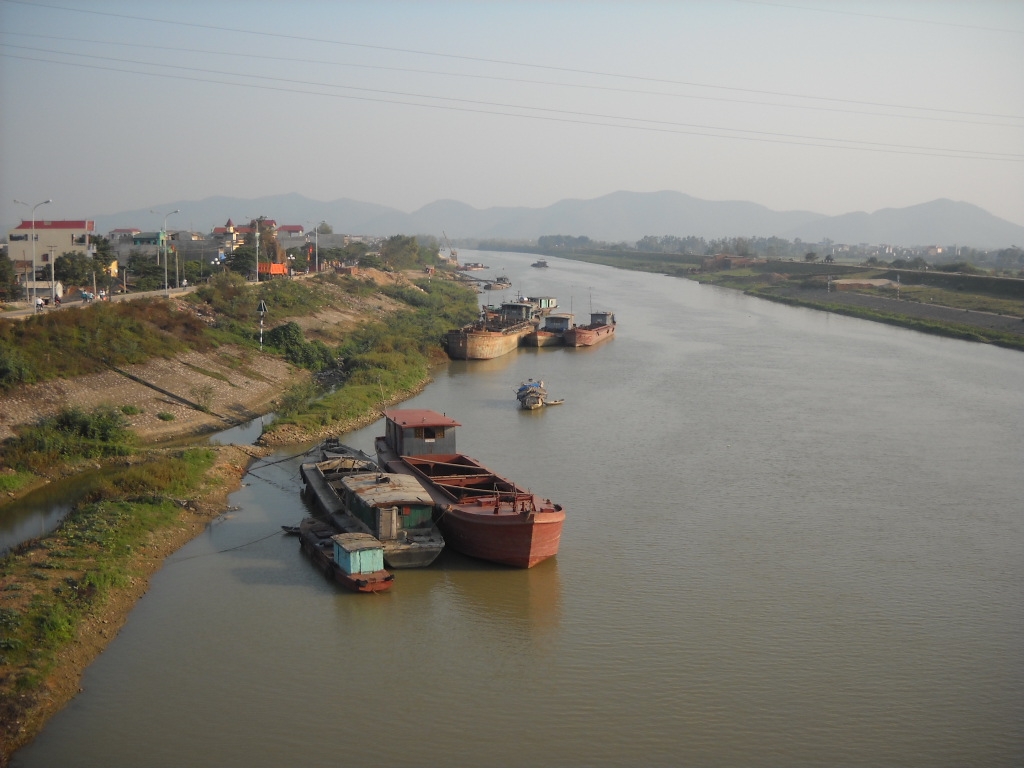
- Cầu River at Việt Yên, Bắc Ninh

Physical characteristics
- Source
  - location: Phia Bioóc Peak, Văn Ôn, Chợ Đồn, Thái Nguyên
- Mouth
  - location: Lục Đầu Giang, Bắc Ninh
  - coordinates: 21°07′26″N 106°17′52″E
- Length: 288 km (179 mi)
- Basin size: 6,030 km^{2} (2,330 sq mi)

Basin features
- Tributaries
  - left: Cà Lồ River, Công River

Cầu River (Vietnamese: Sông Cầu) is a river of northern Vietnam. It flows through the provinces/cities of Thái Nguyên, Hanoi, Bắc Ninh. It begins at the Phia Bioóc Peak in Chợ Đồn, west of mountainous province of Thái Nguyên.

The river has a length of 288 km and basin area of 6,030 km².
