= Vàm Cỏ River =

River in southern Vietnam

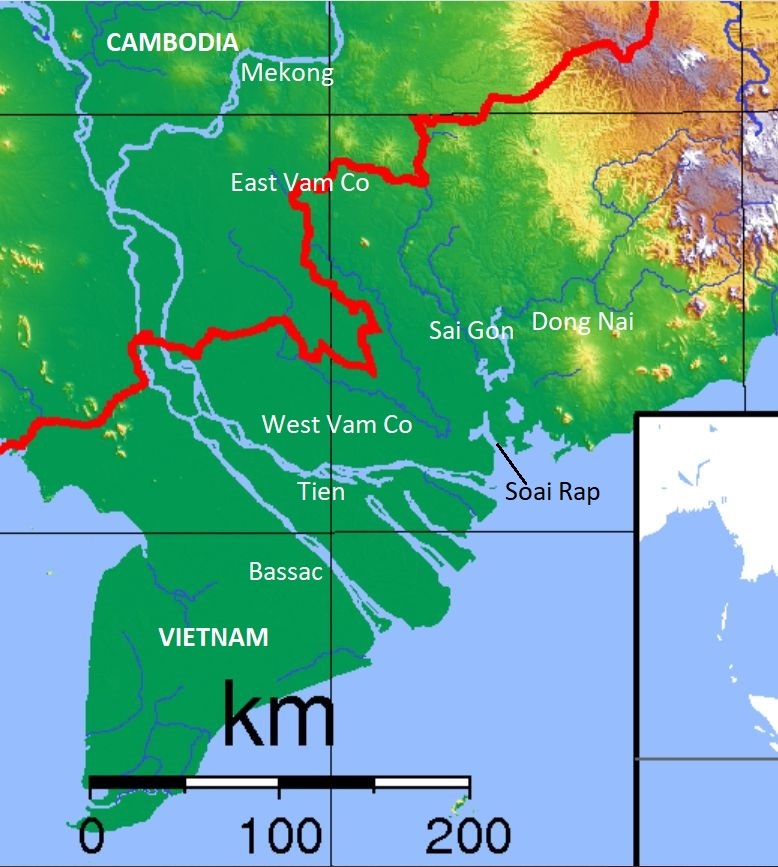
Vam Co River and its two main tributaries.

The Vàm Cỏ River (sông Vàm Cỏ) is a river in Vietnam, south of Ho Chi Minh City. It joins the Soài Rạp in the Cần Giờ Mangrove Forest and is fed by two shallow tributaries, the Vàm Cỏ Tây (west) and Vàm Cỏ Đông (east) forming a V.
