= Thái Bình River System =

Major river system in Vietnam

The Thái Bình River System is one of the two major river systems in the Red River Delta, Vietnam; the other one is the Red River system. Both split from the Red River in the Hưng Yên province. The system consists of 8 rivers flowing in northern Vietnam. This system joining with Red River system creates the Red River Delta.

The part of it between Hưng Yên and the sea, in combination with the part of the Red River from Hanoi to Hưng Yên, was called the River of Tonkin by historical Dutch and English texts.

== Rivers of the system ==
- Bạch Đằng River
- Cầu River
- Kinh Thầy River
- Lach Tray River
- Lục Nam River
- Thái Bình River
- Thuong River
- Van Uc River
