= Thái Bình River =

River in Vietnam

Thái Bình river
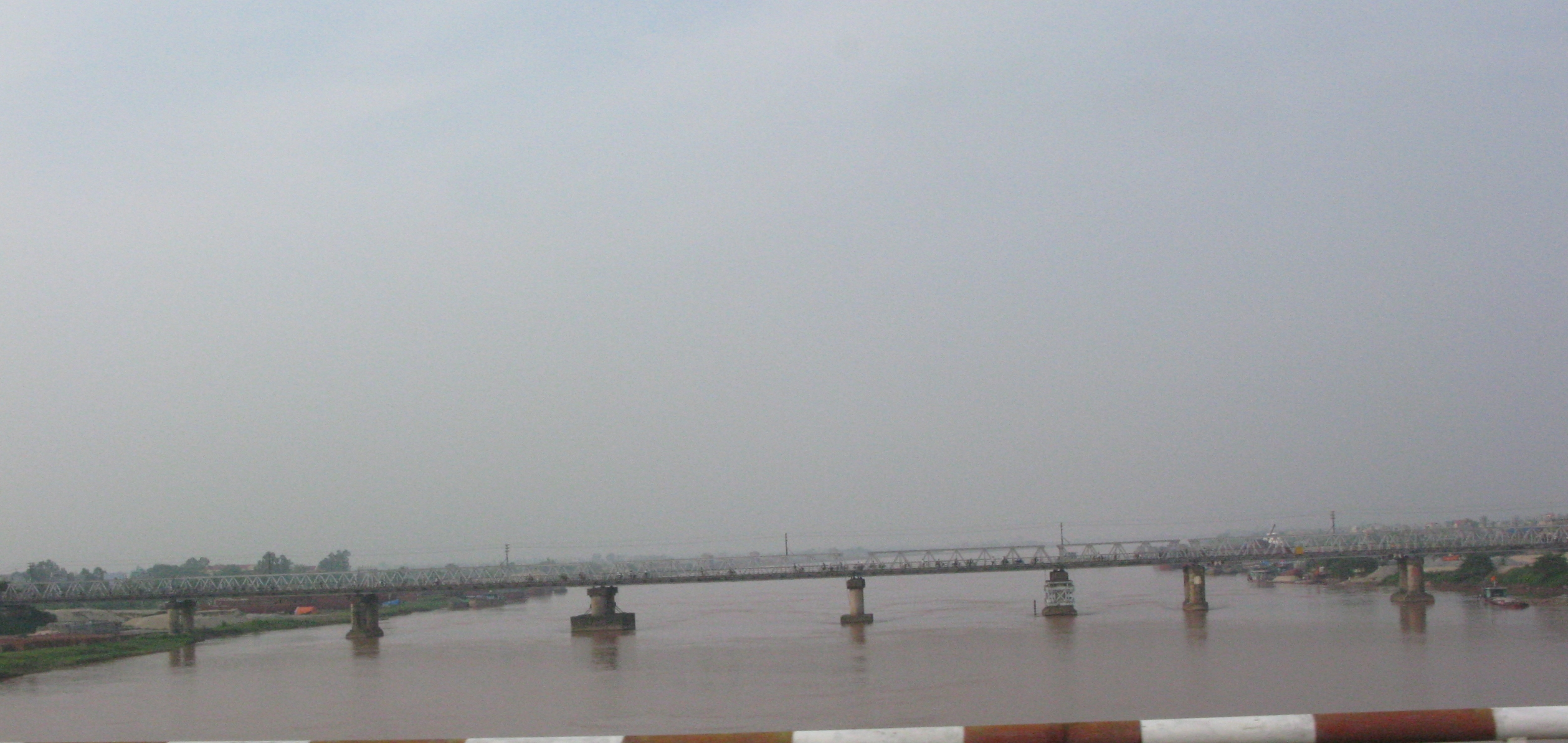
- The Thai Binh River section flowing through Hai Phong.

Location
- Country: Vietnam

Physical characteristics
- Source: Where the Thuong River and Cầu River join with each other.
- Mouth: South China Sea
- Length: 100 km (62 mi)

The Thái Bình river (Vietnamese: Sông Thái Bình) is the main river of the Thái Bình river system in Northern Vietnam. This river system joins with the Red River system and brings alluvium to the Red River Delta.

Thái Bình river starts in the area of Đồng Phúc commune, Yên Dũng District, Bắc Giang Province – where the Thuong River and Cầu River join with each other. It then flows to Hải Dương Province and becomes the boundary between the two provinces of Bắc Giang and Hải Dương. After flowing through the area of the city of Hải Dương, it enters Thái Bình Province and flows to the South China Sea at Ba Lat river's mouth.

The total length of the main river is about 100 km (62 mi).
