= Red River System =

Network of rivers surrounding the Red River, Vietnam

The Red River System is a network of rivers or delta system surrounding the main river - Red River in North Vietnam. These branches of the system contribute to or receive water from Red River. Red River system, joining with the Thái Bình river system in the northeast, creates the Red River Delta - the second largest delta in Vietnam,because of the close relation between Red River system and Thái Bình river system, the two system are known as the common name Red and Thai Binh rivers system. Alluvium of the Red River system creates the central and south Red River Delta. Two banks of the rivers are protected by a great dyke system.

The area has a high population density, with some 20% of Vietnam's residents living in the delta. The network of the Red River system has been used for much of human history as a route for the movement of people and for trade, including as a maritime corridor within the historic Chinese Southwest silk road.

== Rivers of the system ==
- Main river: Red River
- Confluences:
- Da River
- Lô River
- Besides that, confluences of another river - River Đáy, a river starts from mountainous area of Hòa Bình and Ninh Bình provinces, including Bôi river, Hoàng Long river, Vạc river although not contribute water to Red River, but for several reasons, they are still considered as Red River confluences.
- Branches:
- River Đáy and its branches
- Nhuệ River
- Đuống River
- Phủ Lý River (or Châu Giang River)
- Luoc River linking Red River with Thái Bình River
- Trà Lý River, flowing eastward through Thái Bình Province
- Diêm Hộ River
- Ninh Cơ River flowing southward through Nam Định Province
- Nam Định River
- So River
- Lân River

== River mouth ==
- Ba Lat, main river mouth, located in the border between Thái Bình provinces and Nam Định provinces
- Diêm Hộ, Trà Lý, Lân (Thái Bình Province)
- So, Lach Giang (Nam Định Province)
- Đáy, located in the border between Ninh Bình and Nam Định provinces.
