= Cà Lồ River =

River in Vietnam

Coordinates: 21.2436°N 105.9375°E

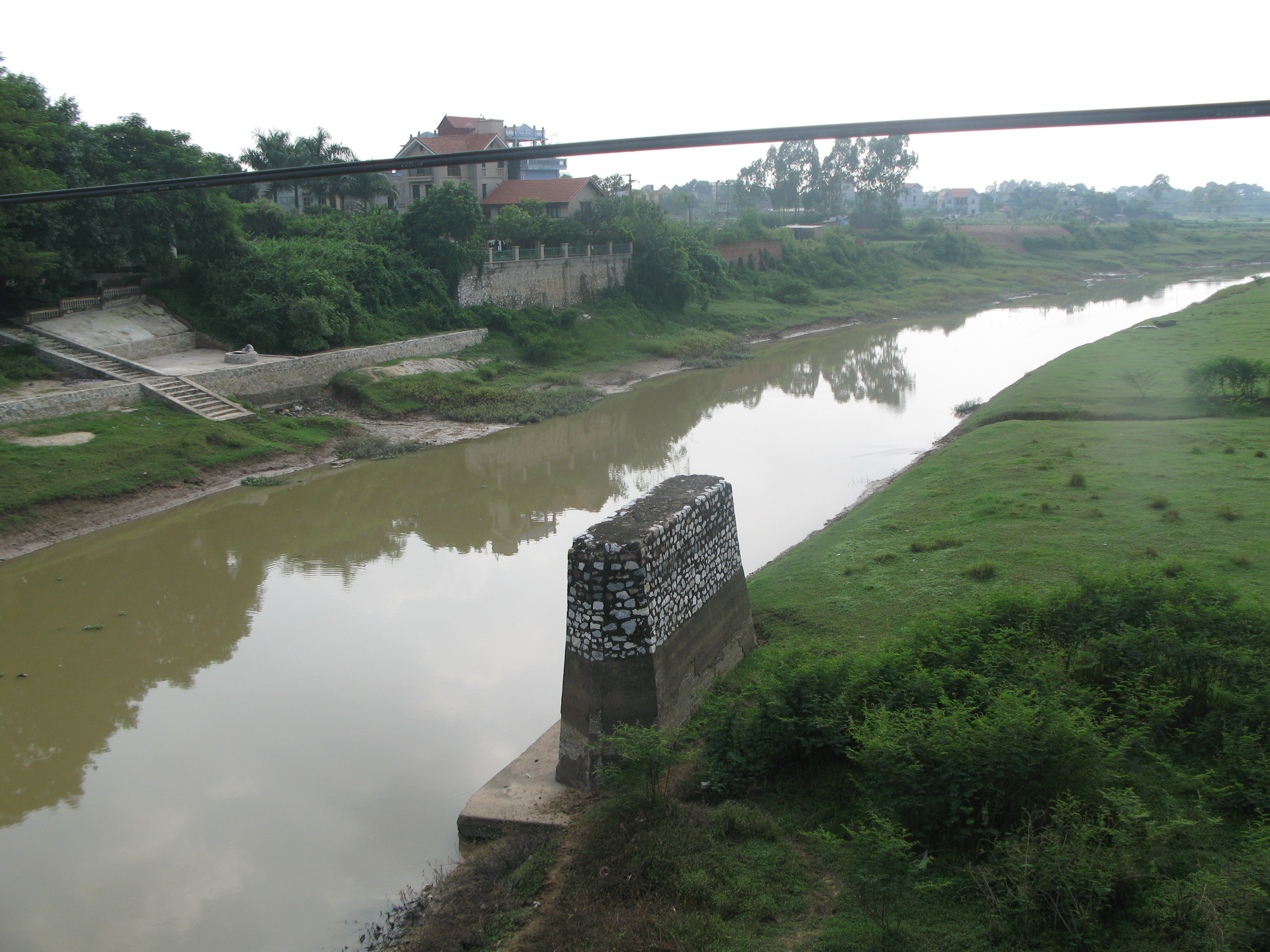
Cà Lồ River

The Cà Lồ River (Vietnamese: Sông Cà Lồ) is a river of Vietnam. It flows through Vĩnh Phúc Province, Hanoi and Bắc Ninh Province for 89 kilometres and has a basin area of 880 km².
