= Phan River =

River in Vietnam

Coordinates: 10.7306°N 107.8731°E

The Phan River (Vietnamese: Sông Phan) is a river of Bình Thuận Province, Vietnam. It flows for 55 kilometres.
