= Lô River =

Tributary of Red River in Vietnam

Coordinates: 21°18′N 105°26′E

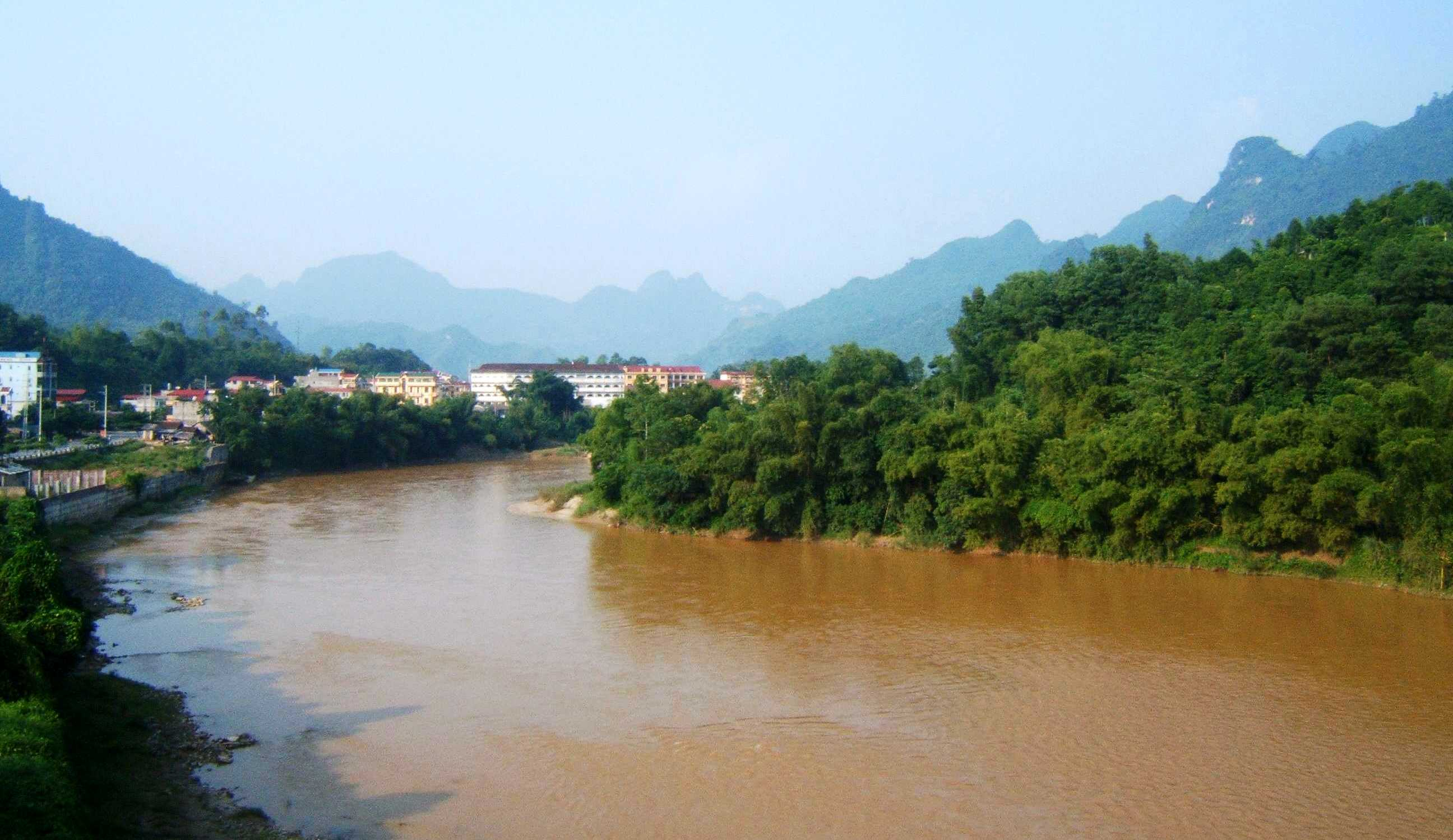
Lô River at the south of Hà Giang town, Vietnam 2005.

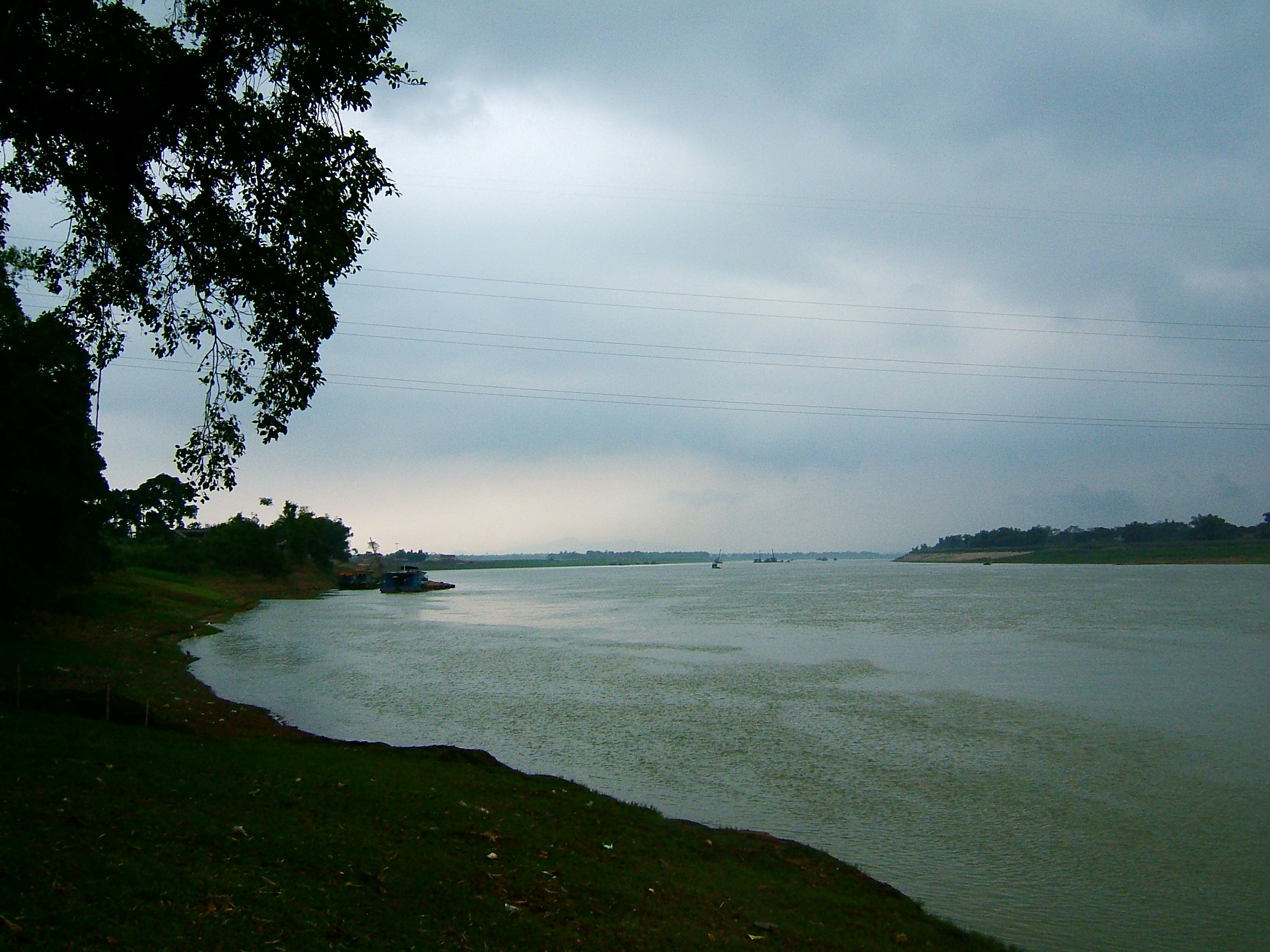
Lô River at Phú Thọ Province.

The Lô River (Vietnamese: Sông Lô) is a major river of Vietnam. It flows through Hà Giang Province, Tuyên Quang Province and Phú Thọ Province for 470 kilometres and has a basin area of 39,000 km^{2} and originates in Yunnan, China.
