= Bình Xuyên =

Bình Xuyên Xã Bình Xuyên
- Commune
- Interactive map of Bình Xuyên
- Location in Vietnam
- Country: Vietnam
- Region: Northeast
- Province: Phú Thọ Province
- Established: June 16, 2025

Area
  - Total: 29.50 km^{2} (11.39 sq mi)

Population (2025)
  - Total: 32,534
  - Density: 1,103/km^{2} (2,856/sq mi)
- Time zone: UTC+07:00 (Indochina Time)

Bình Xuyên is a commune (xã) of Phú Thọ Province, Vietnam.

== Geography ==
Bình Xuyên Commune located in northwestern Phú Thọ Province, and adjacent to:

- Tam Đảo Commune to the north
- Bình Nguyên Commune to the south
- Vĩnh Phúc Ward and Tam Dương Commune to the west
- Bình Tuyền Commune to the east.

== History ==
On June 12, 2025, the National Assembly of Vietnam issued Resolution No. 202/2025/QH15 on the arrangement of provincial-level administrative units (effective from June 12, 2025). Accordingly, the entire land area and population of Vĩnh Phúc Province, Hòa Bình Province and Phú Thọ Province were merged to form a new province named Phú Thọ Province.

On June 16, 2025, the Standing Committee of the National Assembly of Vietnam issued Resolution No. 1676/NQ-UBTVQH15 on the arrangement of commune-level administrative units of Phú Thọ Province in 2025 (effective from June 16, 2025). Accordingly, the entire land area and population of Gia Khánh Township, Hương Sơn Commune and Thiện Kế Commune were merged to form a new commune named Bình Xuyên Commune.
