= Việt Trì (city) =

- Provincial city (Class-1)
- Việt Trì City; Thành phố Việt Trì
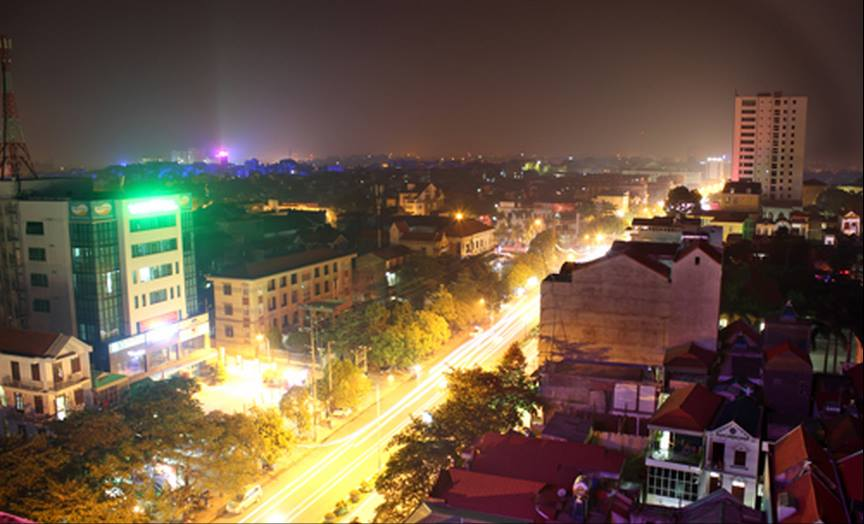
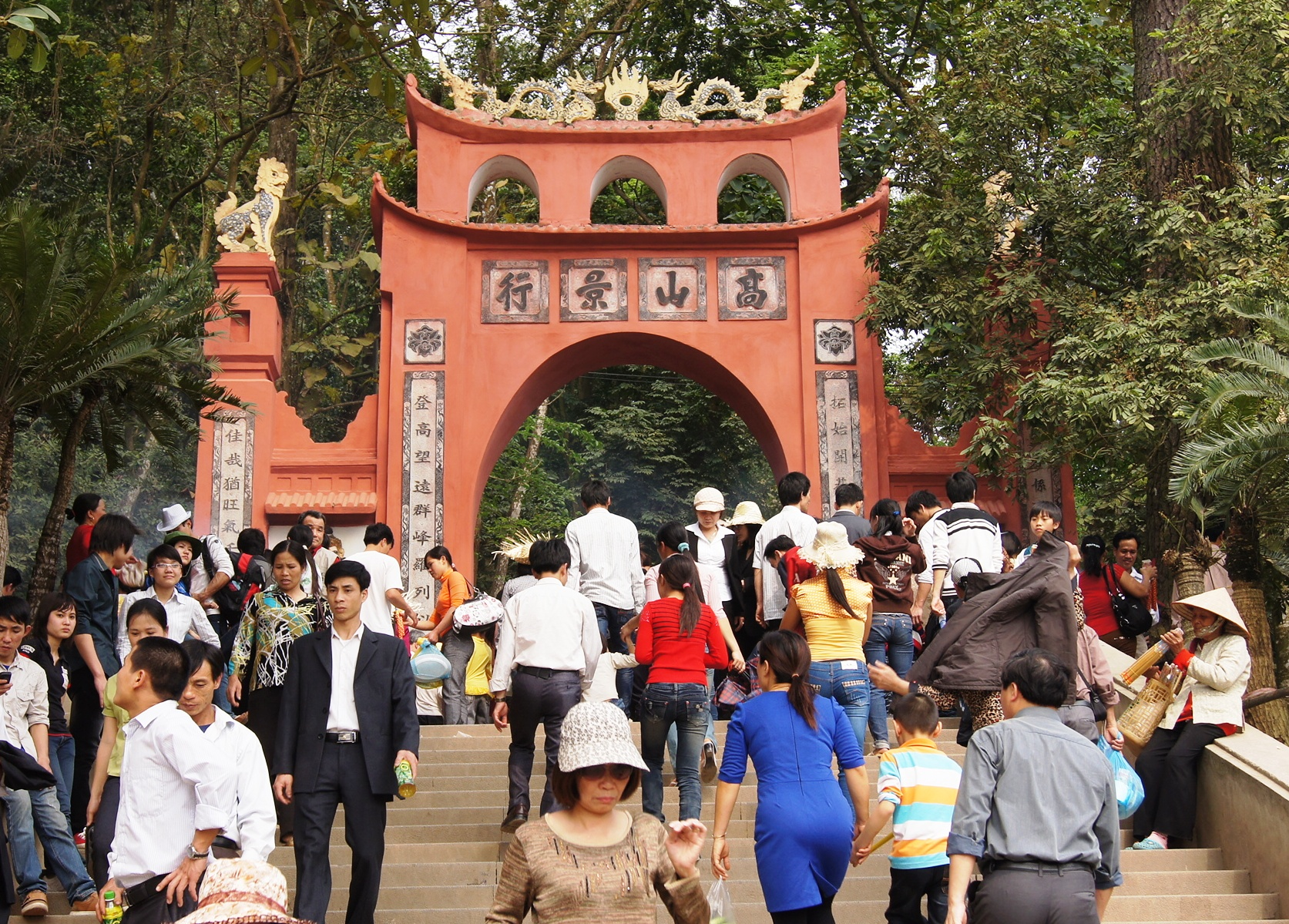
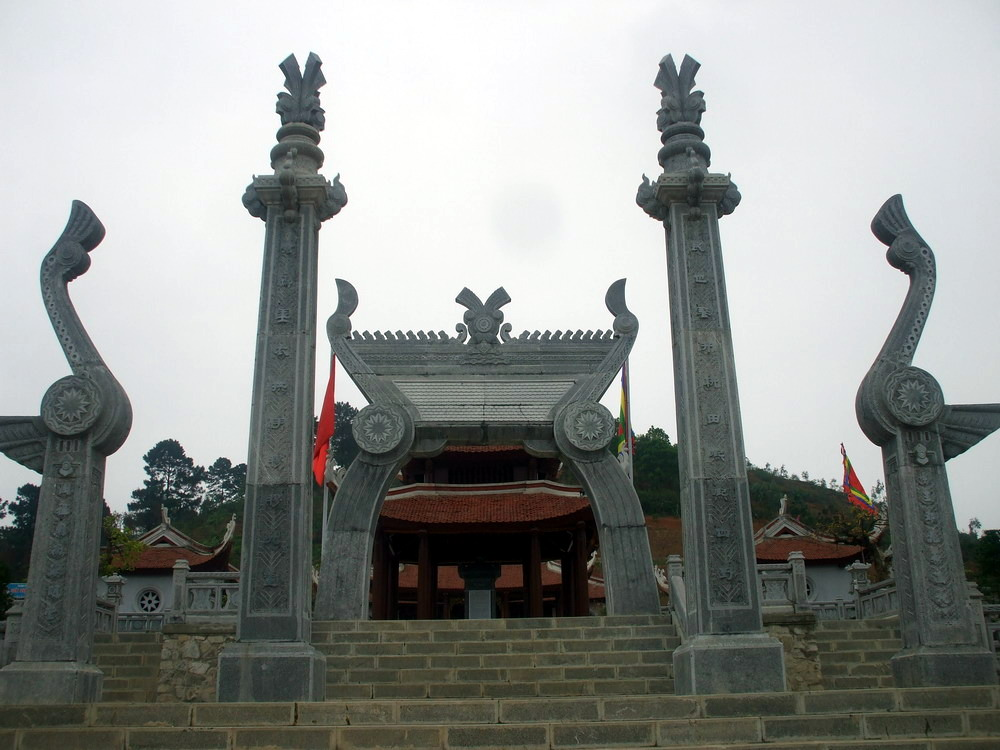
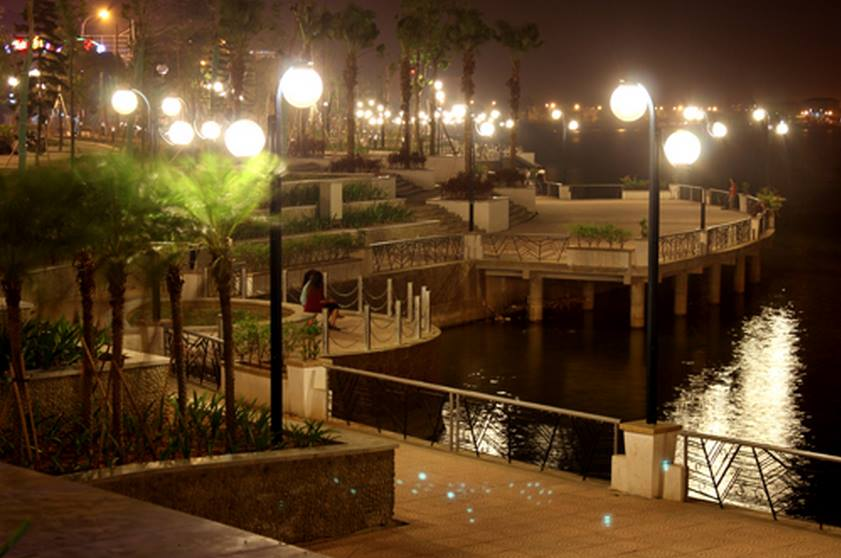
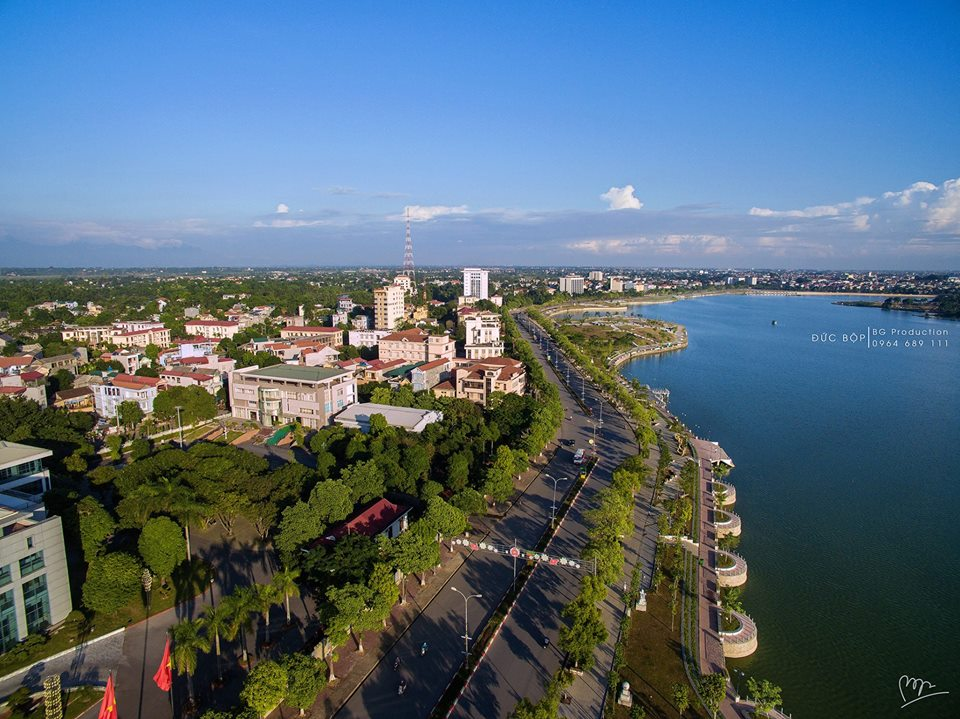
- From top to bottom, from left to right: Việt Tri at night, historical relic area Hùng shrine, Lạc Long Quân temple, Văn Lang park, Nguyễn Tất Thành Street

- Seal

- Location of Việt Trì in Vietnam Việt Trì (Southeast Asia) Việt Trì (Asia)
- Coordinates: 21°18′44″N 105°23′52″E
- Country: Vietnam
- Province: Phú Thọ
- Established (city status): 1962

Area
  - Total: 111.75 km^{2} (43.15 sq mi)

Population (2018)
  - Total: 415,280
  - Density: 3,541.3/km^{2} (9,172/sq mi)
- Climate: Cwa

Việt Trì is a former city located in the Northeast region of Vietnam. It was the capital city of Phú Thọ Province. In 2010, the city had a population of 260,288. The city covers an area of 110 square kilometres (42 mi^{2}). Việt Trì was also the economic centre of the province and contains many industrial firms and service industries. Culturally, Việt Trì is recognized as the first capital of Vietnam, and is thus widely described as the origin of the Vietnamese nation.

Việt Trì ceased to exist as a municipal city on 1 July 2025, following the elimination of district level units in Vietnam.

== Geography ==
=== Geographical position ===
Việt Trì is located 70 kilometres (43 mi) northwest of Hanoi in northern Vietnam at "Ngã ba Hạc" (Hạc Junction) on the Red River where the Red River is joined by the Lô River, slightly downstream of where the Black River joins the Red River. Therefore Việt Trì is also known as the City of Confluence.

=== Administrative boundaries ===
The city borders the three districts of Lập Thạch, Sông Lô and Vĩnh Tường (Vĩnh Phúc Province) to the east, Lâm Thao District to the west, Ba Vì District (Hanoi) to the south and Phù Ninh District to the north.

=== Administrative divisions ===
The city contains 13 wards: Bạch Hạc, Thanh Miếu, Thọ Sơn, Tiên Cát, Nông Trang, Vân Cơ, Bến Gót, Gia Cẩm, Tân Dân, Dữu Lâu, Minh Nông, Minh Phương and Vân Phú, and 10 communes: Thuỵ Vân, Phượng Lâu, Sông Lô, Trưng Vương, Hy Cương, Chu Hoá, Thanh Đình, Hùng Lô, Kim Đức and Tân Đức.

== Economy ==
Việt Trì is one of the first industrial cities of northern Vietnam. The city has great potential for industrial development, agriculture, trade and services. A number of industries are developing including the chemical, paper, and apparel industries. The city focuses on factories, enterprises, and companies with industrial scale production, with a large proportion every year that contributes a large amount of provincial funding and jobs for many workers. A number of factories and companies are located in the district such as:

- Việt Trì Paper Factory Maintenance
- Red River Steel Plant
- Vietnam Chemical Plant Maintenance
- CMC tiles factory
- Lot River Shipyard
- JSC Hanoi-Hong Ha Beer
- Company shares rose Aluminum River

Many factories and companies are also located in the industrial zone:

- Thuỵ Vân Industrial Park
- Đồng Lạng Industrial Park
- White Industrial Park
- South Vietnamese Accounting Maintenance Industrial Park

== Education ==
University-level colleges - Maintenance in Việt Trì city:

- Hùng Vương University (Multi-level universities, multi-disciplinary) including:
  - Faculty of Mathematics - Technology
  - Faculty of Economics - Business Management
  - Faculty of Agriculture - Forestry - Fishing
  - Faculty of Foreign Languages + Faculty of Social Sciences - Humanities
  - Faculty of Primary Education - Kindergarten
  - Faculty of Natural Sciences
  - Faculty of Music Art
  - University Preparatory School national central of Việt Trì
- Việt Trì University of Industry
- College of Pharmacy - Fushico (named University Pharmacy - Fushico in 2012)
- Medical College (named Nursing University in 2013)
- College of Engineering - Economics
- College of Food Industry
- College of Mechanical and Electrical
- College of Arts and Culture
- Red River Intermediate occupations
- Provincial Center KTTHHN
- Center for continuing education of Việt Trì

secondary education system of Việt Trì city:

- Specialist secondary schools Hùng Vương
  - Việt Trì secondary schools
  - Nguyễn Tất Thành

Secondary schools

- Việt Trì Industrial's secondary school
- Herman secondary school + Việt Trì Engineer's secondary school
- Vũ Thê Lang secondary school
- Lê Quý Đôn secondary school
- Âu Cơ Private schools
- Việt Trì Private school
- Vân Phú Private school

== Health care system ==
- Phú Thọ Provincial Hospital
- Hospital Building Corporation Red River
- Hospital of Traditional Medicine
- Faculty of Occupational Diseases, Hospital of Việt Trì
- Việt Trì Textile Maintenance Clinic Hospital
- Việt Trì Hospital Engineering
- Children's Hospital
- Hospital Care and the Rehabilitation
- The Board, Department of Health in the Company
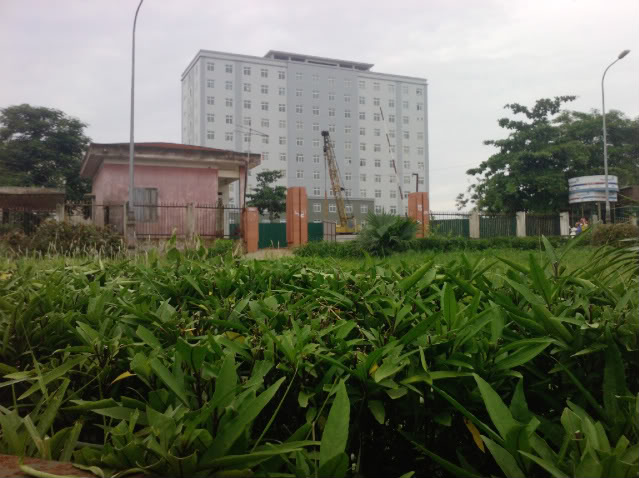

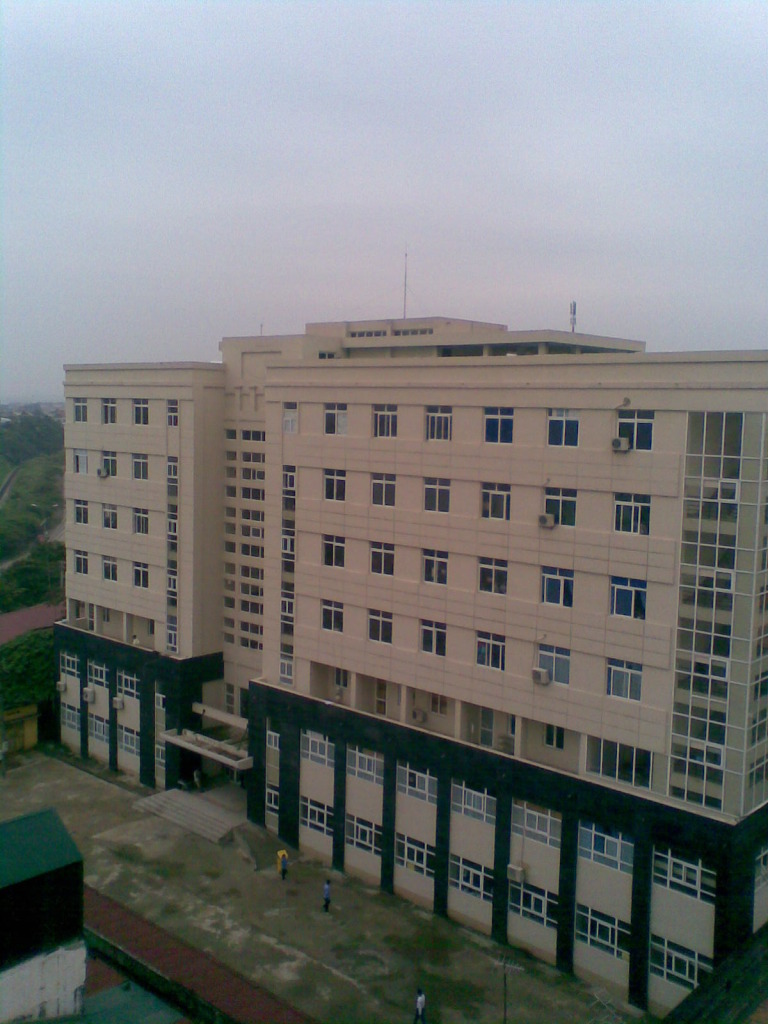

== Transport and Transportation ==
Việt Trì's prime responsibility is as an industrial city, due to being located near the confluence of three rivers. The city laid the groundwork for a roots festival in 2015, so in recent years it has undergone infrastructure investment to make sure the it is of fairly uniform construction. Many roads are being renovated, boasting upgrades and new construction to standardized inner city roads to always ensure smooth traffic. Transportation of goods across motorways, railways and rivers is also fairly convenient. National routes 2 and 32 are important for transportation from Việt Trì city to other cities and provinces in Vietnam. In 2012, Việt Trì was designated a class 1 provincial city according to Vietnam's "City Classification Criteria".

== Climate ==
Climate data for Việt Trì
Month	Jan	Feb	Mar	Apr	May	Jun	Jul	Aug	Sep	Oct	Nov	Dec	Year
Record high °C (°F)	31.8 (89.2)	33.8 (92.8)	35.6 (96.1)	38.8 (101.8)	41.2 (106.2)	41.4 (106.5)	39.9 (103.8)	39.2 (102.6)	37.5 (99.5)	35.8 (96.4)	34.8 (94.6)	32.0 (89.6)	41.4 (106.5)
Mean daily maximum °C (°F)	19.5 (67.1)	20.5 (68.9)	23.3 (73.9)	27.6 (81.7)	31.7 (89.1)	33.0 (91.4)	32.9 (91.2)	32.3 (90.1)	31.5 (88.7)	29.1 (84.4)	25.7 (78.3)	21.9 (71.4)	27.4 (81.3)
Daily mean °C (°F)	16.4 (61.5)	17.5 (63.5)	20.3 (68.5)	24.1 (75.4)	27.4 (81.3)	28.9 (84.0)	28.9 (84.0)	28.4 (83.1)	27.4 (81.3)	25.1 (77.2)	21.6 (70.9)	18.0 (64.4)	23.7 (74.7)
Mean daily minimum °C (°F)	14.3 (57.7)	15.6 (60.1)	18.3 (64.9)	21.7 (71.1)	24.4 (75.9)	25.9 (78.6)	26.1 (79.0)	25.7 (78.3)	24.7 (76.5)	22.4 (72.3)	18.9 (66.0)	15.4 (59.7)	21.1 (70.0)
Record low °C (°F)	5.0 (41.0)	5.4 (41.7)	7.7 (45.9)	13.0 (55.4)	16.7 (62.1)	20.1 (68.2)	20.3 (68.5)	21.7 (71.1)	17.3 (63.1)	13.1 (55.6)	9.7 (49.5)	5.3 (41.5)	5.0 (41.0)
Average rainfall mm (inches)	29.7 (1.17)	30.0 (1.18)	45.4 (1.79)	96.1 (3.78)	186.2 (7.33)	247.8 (9.76)	267.6 (10.54)	295.1 (11.62)	191.6 (7.54)	131.0 (5.16)	53.3 (2.10)	22.5 (0.89)	1,596.2 (62.84)
Average rainy days	11.4	12.6	15.4	13.9	14.8	15.1	16.5	16.4	12.4	9.5	7.9	6.8	152.7
Average relative humidity (%)	83.6	84.7	85.7	85.9	82.5	81.9	83.0	84.3	82.9	81.3	80.6	79.9	83.0
Mean monthly sunshine hours	65.5	49.0	48.9	90.2	170.8	165.7	183.1	175.4	173.7	156.2	131.6	113.1	1,517
Source: Vietnam Institute for Building Science and Technology
