= Lập Thạch district =

Lập Thạch District Huyện Lập Thạch
- District
- Interactive map of Lập Thạch District
- Country: Vietnam
- Region: Red River Delta
- Province: Vĩnh Phúc
- Capital: Lập Thạch

Area
  - Total: 66.8 sq mi (173.1 km^{2})

Population (2008)
  - Total: 123,664
- Time zone: UTC+7 (UTC + 7)

Lập Thạch is a rural district of Vĩnh Phúc province in the Red River Delta region of northern Vietnam. This district is located in the northwestern Vĩnh Phúc, at coordinates: 105°30′ to 105°45′ E and 21°10′ to 21°30′ N, bordering Tuyên Quang on the north, districts of Tam Đảo and Tam Dương on the east, Vĩnh Tường on the south and Sông Lô district and Phú Thọ province on the west.

== Administrations ==
Lập Thạch is subdivided into eighteen communes (xã) and two townships (thị trấn). The communes are Sơn Đông, Triệu Đề, Đình Chu, Xuân Lôi, Văn Quán, Tiên Lữ, Đồng Ích, Bàn Giản, Tử Du, Liên Hòa, Ngọc Mỹ, Xuân Hòa, Vân Trục, Liễn Sơn, Thái Hòa, Bắc Bình, Hợp Lý, Quang Sơn, and the townships are Lập Thạch, the district seat, and Hoa Sơn.

== Demographics ==
As of December 2008 the district had a population of 123,664. The district covers an area of 173.1 km^{2}.
