= Vĩnh Phúc =

Vĩnh Phúc Phường Vĩnh Phúc
- Ward
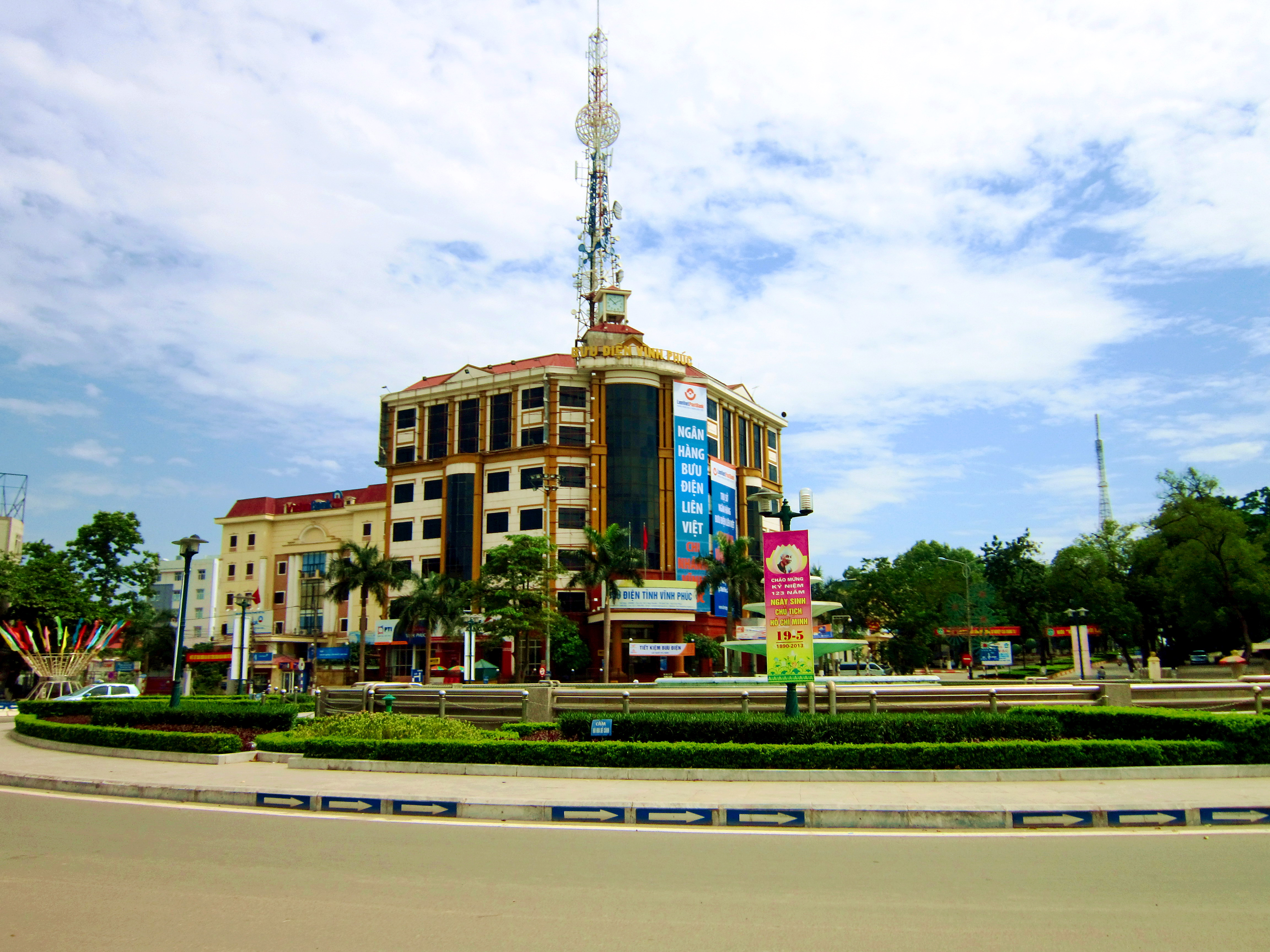
- Vĩnh Phúc Post Office
- Interactive map of Vĩnh Phúc
- Country: Vietnam
- Regions: Northeast
- Province: Phú Thọ Province
- Established: June 16, 2025

Area
  - Total: 25.30 km^{2} (9.77 sq mi)

Population (2025)
  - Total: 78,371
  - Density: 3,098/km^{2} (8,023/sq mi)
- Time zone: UTC+07:00 (Indochina Time)

Vĩnh Phúc is a ward (phường) of Phú Thọ Province, Vietnam.

== Geography ==
Vĩnh Phúc Ward located in northwestern Phú Thọ Province, and adjacent to:

- Tam Dương Commune to the north
- Vĩnh Yên Ward and Bình Nguyên Commune to the south
- Hội Thịnh Commune to the west
- Bình Xuyên Commune to the east.

== History ==
On June 12, 2025, the National Assembly of Vietnam issued Resolution No. 202/2025/QH15 on the arrangement of provincial-level administrative units (effective from June 12, 2025). Accordingly, the entire land area and population of Vĩnh Phúc Province, Hòa Bình Province and Phú Thọ Province were merged to form a new province named Phú Thọ Province.

On June 16, 2025, the Standing Committee of the National Assembly of Vietnam issued Resolution No. 1676/NQ-UBTVQH15 on the arrangement of commune-level administrative units of Phú Thọ Province in 2025 (effective from June 16, 2025). Accordingly, the entire land area and population of Định Trung, Liên Bảo, Khai Quang, Ngô Quyền, and Đống Đa Wards were merged to form a new ward named Vĩnh Phúc Ward.
