= Yen Lac (disambiguation) =

Yên Lạc may refer to several places in Vietnam, including:

- Yên Lạc, a commune of Phú Thọ province
- Yên Lạc district, a former rural district of Vĩnh Phúc province
