= Vĩnh Yên =

Vĩnh Yên Phường Vĩnh Yên
- Ward
- University of Transport Technology – Vinh Yen Campus
- Interactive map of Vĩnh Yên
- Country: Vietnam
- Regions: Northeast
- Province: Phú Thọ Province
- Established: June 16, 2025

Area
  - Total: 25.00 km^{2} (9.65 sq mi)

Population (2025)
  - Total: 56,428
  - Density: 2,257/km^{2} (5,846/sq mi)
- Time zone: UTC+07:00 (Indochina Time)

Vĩnh Yên is a ward (phường) of Phú Thọ Province, Vietnam.

== Geography ==
Vĩnh Yên Ward located in northeastern Phú Thọ Province, and adjacent to:

- Vĩnh Phúc Ward to the north
- Tề Lỗ Commune and Yên Lạc Commune to the south
- Hội Thịnh Commune to the west
- Bình Nguyên Commune and Xuân Lãng Commune to the east.

== History ==
On June 12, 2025, the National Assembly of Vietnam issued Resolution No. 202/2025/QH15 on the arrangement of provincial-level administrative units (effective from June 12, 2025). Accordingly, the entire land area and population of Vĩnh Phúc Province, Hòa Bình Province and Phú Thọ Province were merged to form a new province named Phú Thọ Province.

On June 16, 2025, the Standing Committee of the National Assembly of Vietnam issued Resolution No. 1676/NQ-UBTVQH15 on the arrangement of commune-level administrative units of Phú Thọ Province in 2025 (effective from June 16, 2025). Accordingly, the entire land area and population of Tích Sơn, Hội Hợp, Đồng Tâm Wards, and Thanh Trù Commune were merged to form a new ward named Vĩnh Yên Ward.
