= Vĩnh Yên (disambiguation) =

Vĩnh Yên may refer to several places in Vietnam, including:

- Vĩnh Yên (city), a former city and capital of Vĩnh Phúc Province
- Vĩnh Yên, a ward of Phú Thọ Province
