= Vĩnh Phúc (disambiguation) =

Vĩnh Phúc may refer to several places in Vietnam, including:

- Vĩnh Phúc province, a former province in Red River Delta
- Vĩnh Phúc, a ward of Phú Thọ Province
