= Ba Bể Lake =

Lake in the Bắc Kạn Province of Vietnam

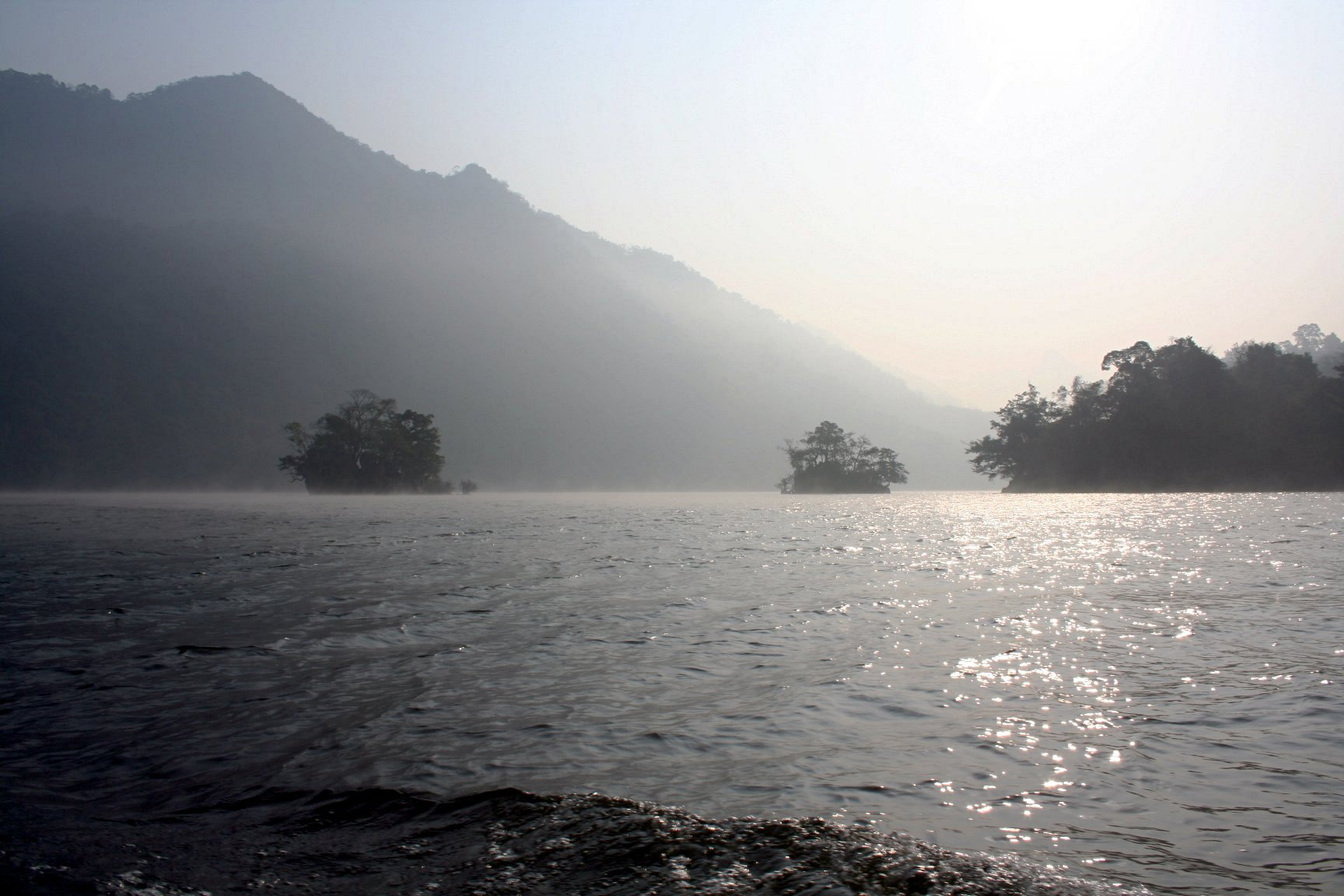

- Location within Vietnam
- Location: Ba Bể Commune, Thái Nguyên Province
- Coordinates: 22°25′N 105°37′E
- Basin countries: Vietnam
- Max. length: 8 km (5.0 mi)
- Max. width: 100–600 m (330–1,970 ft)
- Surface area: 6.5 km^{2} (2.5 sq mi)
- Average depth: 15–17 m (49–56 ft)
- Max. depth: 29 m (95 ft)
- Surface elevation: 145 m (476 ft)

Ba Bể Lake (Vietnamese: Hồ Ba Bể; Ba means Three, Bể is from the Tày language word pé, meaning "lake") is the largest natural lake in Vietnam. It is located in Ba Bể Commune, Thái Nguyên Province in the Northeast region of the country.

Having been formed approximately 200 million years ago during the Triassic, the lake is surrounded by limestone cliffs, which in turn are covered by primary forests. The lake comprises three zones named Pé Lầm, Pé Lù, and Pé Lèng. Three rivers, named Năng, Tả Han, and Nam Cường, are the main inflows of the lake. The Năng river enters the lake through a large waterfall called Đầu Đẳng. In the lake there are also three islands, named Án Mã, Khẩu Cúm, and Po Gia Mải (literally "Widow's Island").

Ba Bể Lake is a featured geographical science and is a biodiversity reservoir. It is a part of the Ba Bể National Park. It is home to a range of animals and plants.

== The legend of Ba Bể Lake ==
Legend has it that there was a poor old lady visiting the local village. Villagers distrusted her for she seemed dirty and ugly-looking. Fortunately, she was eventually assisted by a good-hearted mother and her son.

The truth was that the old lady turned out to be a fairy. She told the mother and son that the village and surrounding areas were about to be struck by a flood. Despite her warnings, no one believed her, except for the mother and son, who began to build a boat.

The next night, a terrible rainstorm began to engulf the village.

The mother and son, who had prepared their boat beforehand, survived and saved many people from drowning.

The village was subsequently submerged in water and gradually formed into the current Ba Bể Lake.

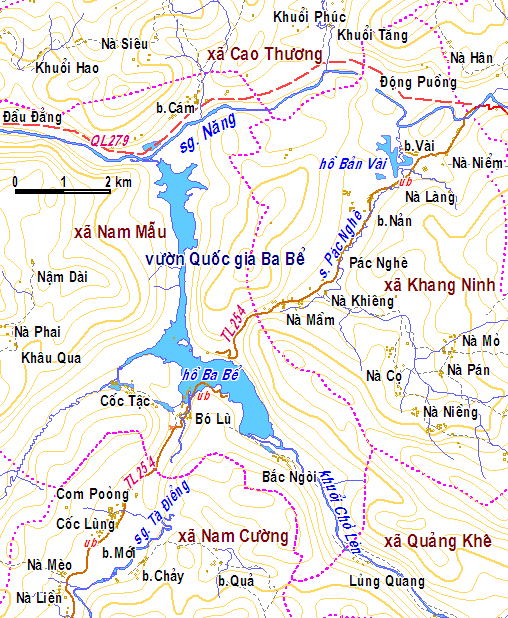
Ba Bể Lake Map. Blk: hamlet, Brn: commune, Blu: water, QL: Nat.Rd, TL: Loc.Rd.

== Attractions ==
Notable attractions around Ba Bể Lake include Puông Cave, Thẳm Phầy Cave, An Mã Temple, and surrounding Tày villages within Ba Bể National Park.
