= Vietri =

Vietri may refer to the following places in Italy:

- Vietri di Potenza, in the province of Potenza, Basilicata
- Vietri sul Mare, in the province of Salerno, Campania

== See also ==
- De Vietri, surname
- Việt Trì, the capital city of Phú Thọ Province, Vietnam
  - Việt Trì (city)
