= Thượng Bằng La =

- Commune
- Location within Vietnam
- Coordinates: 21°27′34″N 104°45′38″E
- Country: Vietnam
- Region: Northeast
- Province: Lào Cai

Area
  - Total: 7.31 sq mi (18.92 km^{2})

Population (1999)
  - Total: 5,510
- Time zone: UTC+7 (UTC + 7)

Thượng Bằng La is a commune of Lào Cai Province in the northeastern region of Vietnam.

On June 16, 2025, the Standing Committee of the National Assembly issued Resolution No. 1680/NQ-UBTVQH15 on the reorganization of commune-level administrative units in Lào Cai Province in 2025. Accordingly, Nông trường Trần Phú Township and Thượng Bằng La Commune were merged to form a new commune named Thượng Bằng La Commune.
