= Dai Dinh =

Dai Dinh may refer to:

- Đại Định (1140–1162), era name used by Lý Anh Tông
- Đại Định (1369–1370), era name used by Dương Nhật Lễ
- Đại Đình, a commune-level town in Tam Đảo district, Vĩnh Phúc, Vietnam
