= Bắc Giang (disambiguation) =

Bắc Giang may refer to the following:

- Bắc Giang, is a ward and capital of Bắc Ninh city
- Bắc Giang province, is a former province of Vietnam
- Bắc Giang (city), is a former city of Bac Giang province
- Bắc Giang River, is a river of Vietnam
