= De Vietri =

De Vietri is a surname. Notable people with the surname include:

- Christian de Vietri (born 1981), Australian artist
- Gabrielle de Vietri (born 1983), Australian politician

== See also ==
- Vietri (disambiguation)
