= Bình Sơn Pagoda =

Pagoda in Vĩnh Phúc province, Vietnam

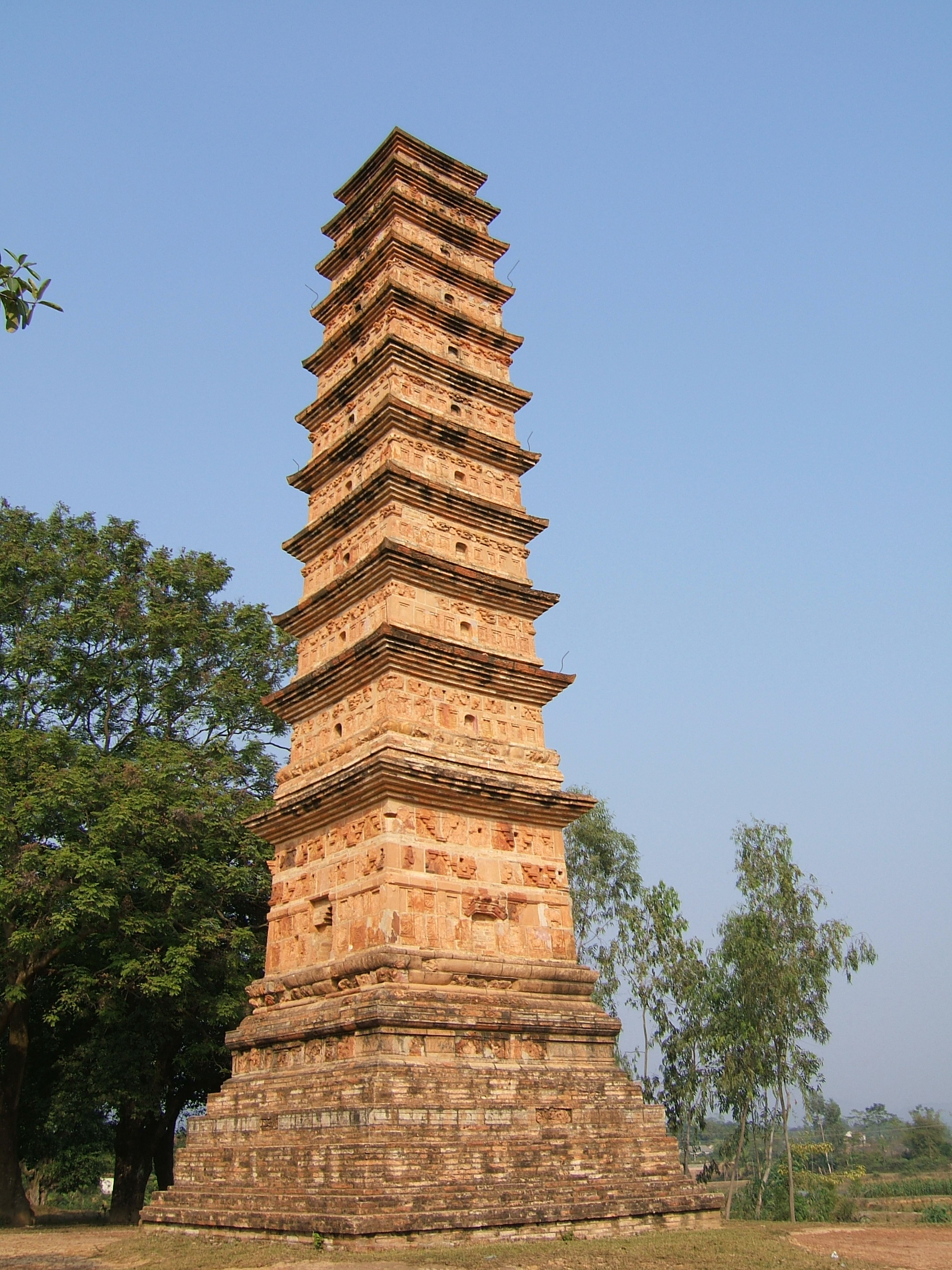
Bình Sơn Pagoda

Bình Sơn Pagoda (Vietnamese: Tháp Bình Sơn) is an 11-story terracotta Buddhist pagoda at Vĩnh Khánh Temple in Vĩnh Phúc province, Vietnam. It was built under the Trần dynasty and is said to have stood 15 stories tall in its original form.
