= Bình Xuyên district =

Bình Xuyên district Huyện Bình Xuyên
- District
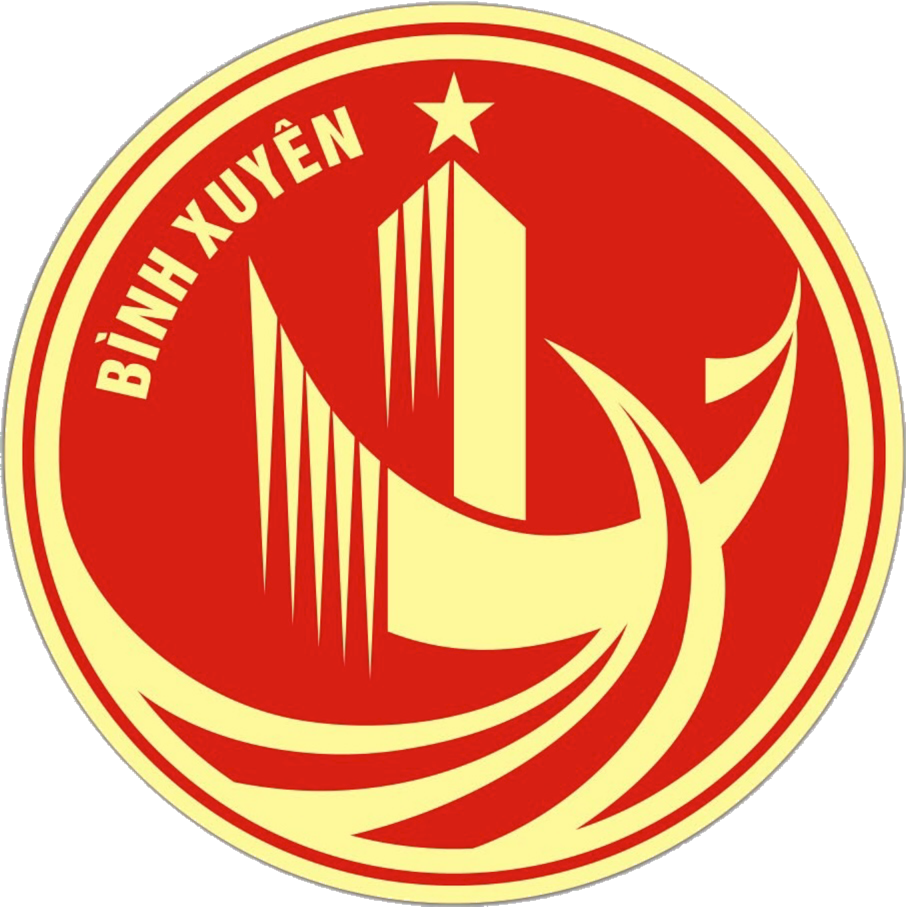
- Seal
- Interactive map of Bình Xuyên district
- Country: Vietnam
- Region: Red River Delta
- Province: Vĩnh Phúc
- Capital: Hương Canh

Area
  - Total: 56 sq mi (145 km^{2})

Population (2003)
  - Total: 104,526
- Time zone: UTC+7 (UTC + 7)

Bình Xuyên is a rural district of Vĩnh Phúc province, in the Red River Delta region of northern Vietnam. As of 2003 the district had a population of 104,526. The district covers an area of 145 km^{2}. The district capital lies at Hương Canh.
