= Vĩnh Yên (city) =

- Provincial city (Class-2)
- Vĩnh Yên City; Thành phố Vĩnh Yên
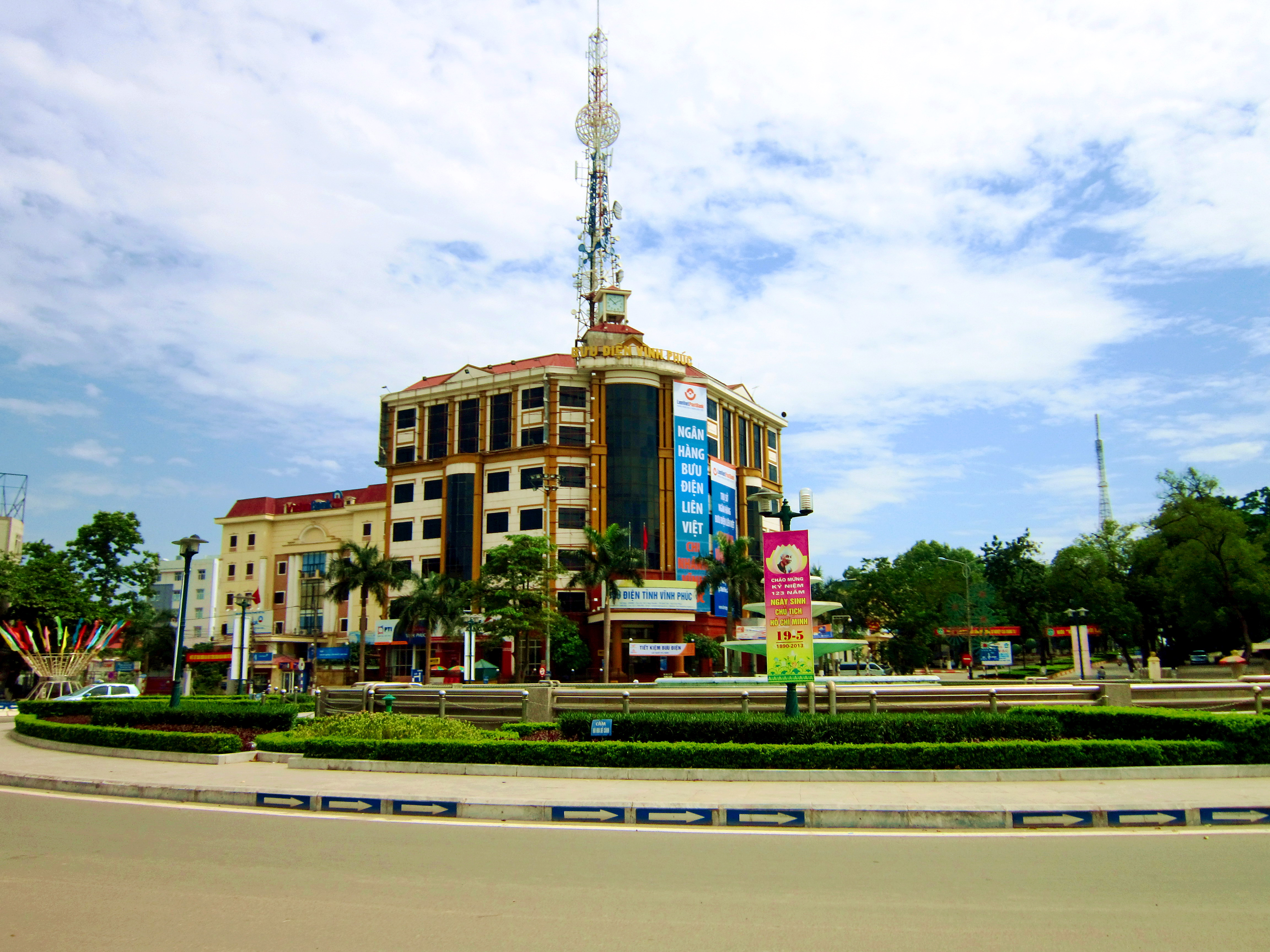
- Vĩnh Phúc Provincial Post Office in the center of Vĩnh Yên city

- Seal
- Interactive map of Vĩnh Yên
- Location of Vĩnh Yên in Vietnam
- Coordinates: 21°18′36″N 105°35′48″E
- Country: Vietnam
- Province: Vĩnh Phúc

Area
  - Total: 50.80 km^{2} (19.61 sq mi)

Population (2013)
  - Total: 152,801
  - Density: 3,007.8/km^{2} (7,790/sq mi)
- Climate: Cwa

Vĩnh Yên (Vietnamese: [vǐɲˀ ʔīən]) is a former city capital of Vĩnh Phúc Province, in the Red River Delta region of northern Vietnam. As of census 2019, the population is 119,128 people, and it covers an area of 50.78 km^{2}.

This city hosted 2012 Asian Men's Cup Volleyball Championship.

== Climate ==
Climate data for Vĩnh Yên
Month	Jan	Feb	Mar	Apr	May	Jun	Jul	Aug	Sep	Oct	Nov	Dec	Year
Record high °C (°F)	31.4 (88.5)	35.2 (95.4)	36.3 (97.3)	39.5 (103.1)	41.1 (106.0)	41.4 (106.5)	39.5 (103.1)	39.2 (102.6)	38.3 (100.9)	36.9 (98.4)	34.4 (93.9)	31.5 (88.7)	41.4 (106.5)
Mean daily maximum °C (°F)	19.8 (67.6)	20.9 (69.6)	23.5 (74.3)	27.8 (82.0)	32.0 (89.6)	33.3 (91.9)	33.2 (91.8)	32.6 (90.7)	31.8 (89.2)	29.4 (84.9)	26.0 (78.8)	22.3 (72.1)	27.7 (81.9)
Daily mean °C (°F)	16.7 (62.1)	17.9 (64.2)	20.5 (68.9)	24.3 (75.7)	27.7 (81.9)	29.2 (84.6)	29.3 (84.7)	28.7 (83.7)	27.8 (82.0)	25.3 (77.5)	21.9 (71.4)	18.3 (64.9)	24.0 (75.2)
Mean daily minimum °C (°F)	14.5 (58.1)	16.0 (60.8)	18.8 (65.8)	22.0 (71.6)	24.8 (76.6)	26.2 (79.2)	26.4 (79.5)	26.0 (78.8)	25.0 (77.0)	22.6 (72.7)	19.1 (66.4)	15.6 (60.1)	21.4 (70.5)
Record low °C (°F)	3.7 (38.7)	5.0 (41.0)	7.7 (45.9)	13.2 (55.8)	16.3 (61.3)	20.4 (68.7)	21.1 (70.0)	21.8 (71.2)	17.4 (63.3)	13.1 (55.6)	8.9 (48.0)	4.4 (39.9)	3.7 (38.7)
Average rainfall mm (inches)	24.9 (0.98)	22.5 (0.89)	43.0 (1.69)	93.7 (3.69)	172.0 (6.77)	246.6 (9.71)	270.4 (10.65)	306.7 (12.07)	178.1 (7.01)	124.9 (4.92)	53.6 (2.11)	16.4 (0.65)	1,564.7 (61.60)
Average rainy days	10.5	11.1	14.8	13.6	14.5	15.2	17.2	16.9	12.8	9.8	7.4	6.0	149.6
Average relative humidity (%)	80.8	82.6	84.0	84.1	80.7	80.7	81.6	83.4	81.5	79.7	78.9	78.3	81.3
Mean monthly sunshine hours	68.3	51.4	51.8	95.0	180.9	172.4	191.3	181.7	180.5	163.5	136.6	115.5	1,585.2
Source: Vietnam Institute for Building Science and Technology, Nchmf.gov.vn (August record high)
