= Bắc Khê River =

River in Vietnam

Coordinates: 22°16′43.8″N 106°26′45.3″E

The Bắc Khê (Vietnamese: Sông Bắc Khê) is a left tributary of the Kỳ Cùng River. It is 54 km long with a catchment area of 801 km^{2} and flows through Tràng Định District in Lạng Sơn Province in northeastern Vietnam. The river flows in a northeasterly-north direction and ends near the border with Cao Bằng Province.
