= Yên Lạc =

- Commune
- Interactive map of Yên Lạc
- Coordinates: 21.234369794260143°N 105.5748653044159°E
- Country: Vietnam
- Region: Northeast
- Province: Phú Thọ
- Established: 16 June 2025

Area
  - Total: 21.70 km^{2} (8.38 sq mi)

Population (2025)
  - Total: 39,730
  - Density: 1,830/km^{2} (4,700/sq mi)

Yên Lạc is a commune in Phú Thọ province, Vietnam.

Yên Lạc was originally established as a township on 28 May 1997 under Decree No. 53/1997/CP.

On 16 June 2025, the National Assembly of Vietnam adopted Resolution No. 203/2025/QH15 amending and supplementing several articles of the Constitution of Vietnam, which provided for the termination of district-level administrative units nationwide from 1 July 2025.

On the same date, the Standing Committee of the National Assembly of Vietnam issued Resolution No. 1676/NQ-UBTVQH15 on the arrangement of commune-level administrative units in Phú Thọ province in 2025. Under the resolution, the entire area and population of Yên Lạc township, Bình Định commune, and Đồng Cương commune were merged to form a new commune named Yên Lạc.
