= Tam Đảo district =

Tam Đảo district Huyện Tam Đảo
- District
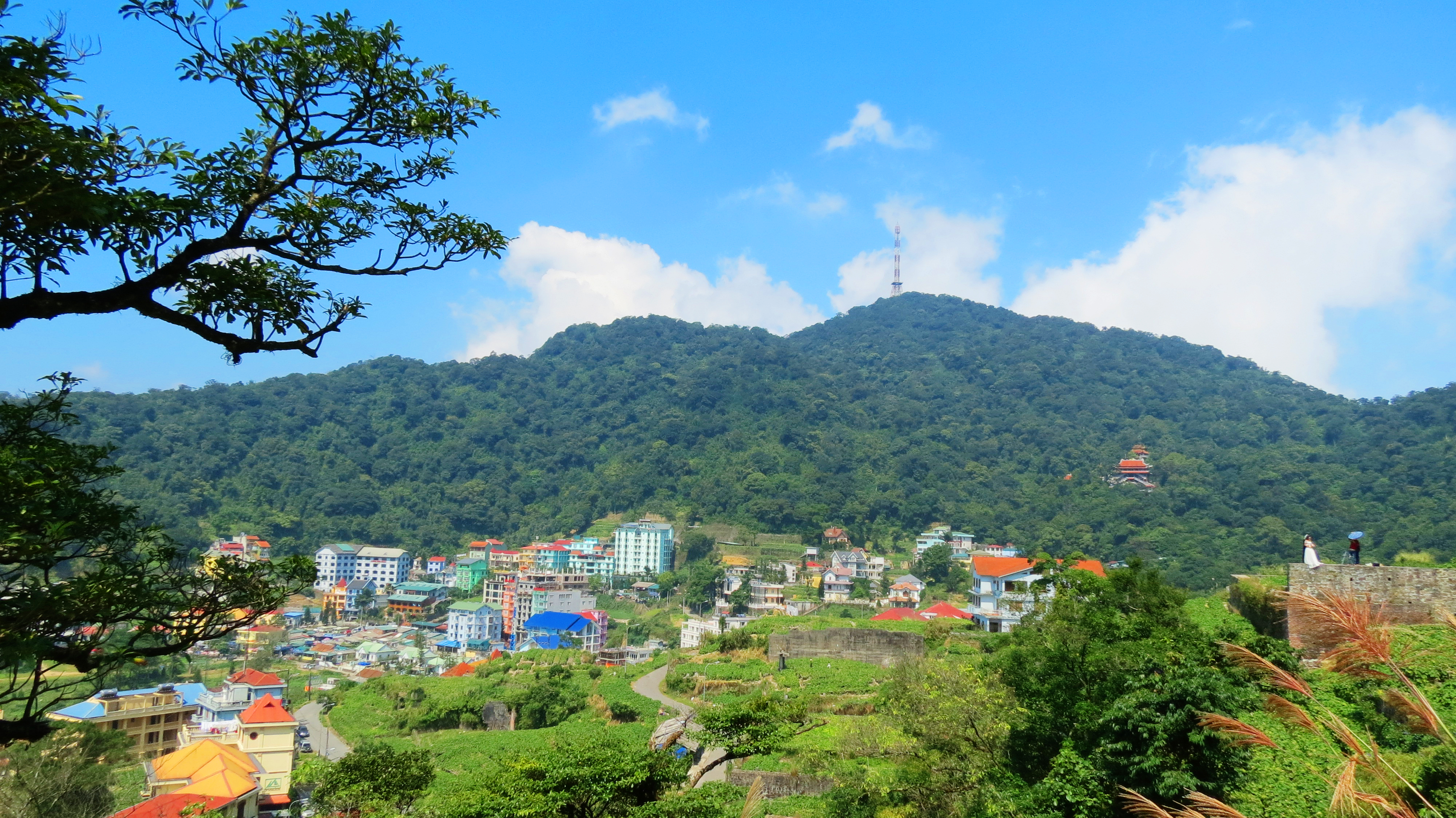
- View of Tam Đảo mountain

- Seal
- Interactive map of Tam Đảo district
- Country: Vietnam
- Region: Red River Delta
- Province: Vĩnh Phúc province
- Capital: Tam Đảo

Area
  - Total: 91 sq mi (236 km^{2})

Population (2003)
  - Total: 65,812
- Time zone: UTC+7 (UTC + 7)

Tam Đảo is a former rural district (huyện) of Vĩnh Phúc province in the Red River Delta region of northern Vietnam. As of 2003 the district had a population of 65,812. The district covers an area of 236 km^{2}. The district capital lies at Hợp Châu town.

== Climate ==
Climate data for Tam Đảo, elevation 897 m (2,943 ft)
Month	Jan	Feb	Mar	Apr	May	Jun	Jul	Aug	Sep	Oct	Nov	Dec	Year
Record high °C (°F)	26.2 (79.2)	29.0 (84.2)	30.7 (87.3)	32.2 (90.0)	33.4 (92.1)	33.0 (91.4)	31.8 (89.2)	32.4 (90.3)	30.8 (87.4)	30.0 (86.0)	27.3 (81.1)	24.7 (76.5)	33.4 (92.1)
Mean daily maximum °C (°F)	13.8 (56.8)	15.0 (59.0)	17.9 (64.2)	21.8 (71.2)	25.0 (77.0)	26.3 (79.3)	26.2 (79.2)	25.8 (78.4)	24.8 (76.6)	22.5 (72.5)	19.3 (66.7)	16.0 (60.8)	21.2 (70.2)
Daily mean °C (°F)	11.2 (52.2)	12.5 (54.5)	15.4 (59.7)	19.0 (66.2)	21.7 (71.1)	23.1 (73.6)	23.2 (73.8)	22.8 (73.0)	21.7 (71.1)	19.2 (66.6)	16.0 (60.8)	12.7 (54.9)	18.2 (64.8)
Mean daily minimum °C (°F)	9.5 (49.1)	10.7 (51.3)	13.6 (56.5)	17.0 (62.6)	19.6 (67.3)	21.1 (70.0)	21.2 (70.2)	20.9 (69.6)	19.8 (67.6)	17.3 (63.1)	14.1 (57.4)	10.7 (51.3)	16.3 (61.3)
Record low °C (°F)	−1.0 (30.2)	0.0 (32.0)	0.5 (32.9)	7.0 (44.6)	9.5 (49.1)	14.3 (57.7)	16.2 (61.2)	17.3 (63.1)	10.6 (51.1)	9.1 (48.4)	4.5 (40.1)	1.1 (34.0)	−1.0 (30.2)
Average precipitation mm (inches)	36.4 (1.43)	47.0 (1.85)	82.2 (3.24)	139.3 (5.48)	235.6 (9.28)	354.3 (13.95)	439.6 (17.31)	452.5 (17.81)	325.5 (12.81)	198.0 (7.80)	85.2 (3.35)	35.3 (1.39)	2,430.9 (95.70)
Average rainy days	17.0	18.6	21.3	19.5	17.6	18.2	20.4	20.3	16.1	13.1	10.4	11.0	203.7
Average relative humidity (%)	89.0	91.4	91.3	91.0	88.1	87.8	88.6	88.8	85.8	83.3	81.3	83.0	87.4
Mean monthly sunshine hours	61.8	44.7	58.6	81.5	133.0	122.0	138.5	126.4	136.8	129.7	115.4	107.1	1,253.7
Source: Vietnam Institute for Building Science and Technology
