= Yên Lạc district =

Coordinates: 21.217°N 105.533°E

Yên Lạc District Huyện Yên Lạc
- District
- Seal
- Interactive map of Yên Lạc District
- Country: Vietnam
- Region: Red River Delta
- Province: Vĩnh Phúc
- Capital: Yên Lạc

Area
  - Total: 41 sq mi (107 km^{2})

Population (2003)
  - Total: 145,316
- Time zone: UTC+7 (UTC + 7)

Yên Lạc is a former rural district of Vĩnh Phúc province in the Red River Delta region of northern Vietnam. As of 2003, the district had a population of 145,316. The district covers an area of 107 km^{2}. The district capital lies at Yên Lạc.
