= Tam Dương district =

Tam Dương district Huyện Tam Dương
- District
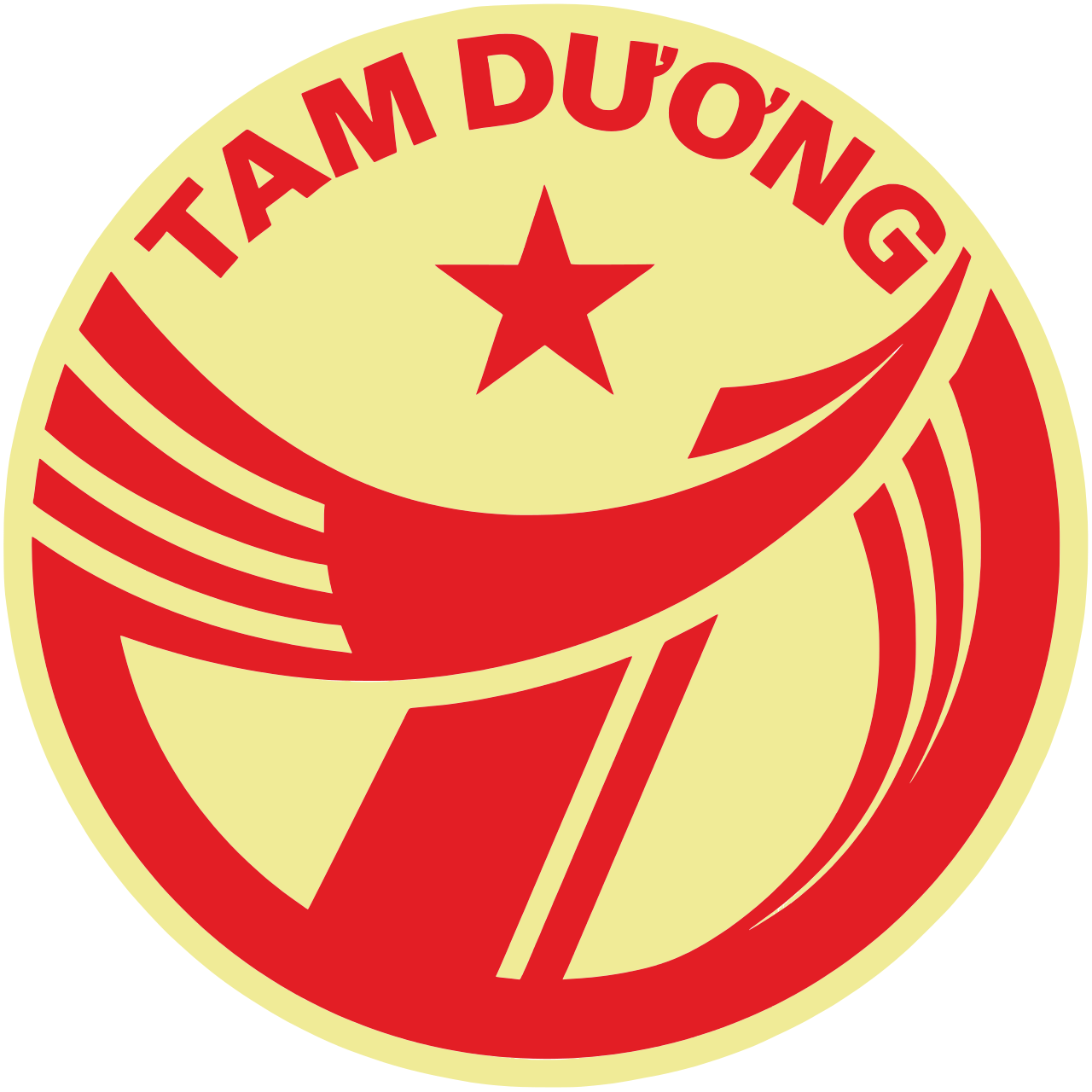
- Seal
- Interactive map of Tam Dương district
- Country: Vietnam
- Region: Red River Delta
- Province: Vĩnh Phúc
- Capital: Hợp Hòa

Area
  - Total: 41 sq mi (107 km^{2})

Population (2003)
  - Total: 94,124
- Time zone: UTC+7 (UTC + 7)

Tam Dương is a former rural district (huyện) of Vĩnh Phúc province in the Red River Delta region of northern Vietnam. As of 2003 the district had a population of 94,124. The district covers an area of 107 km^{2}. The district capital lies at Hợp Hòa.
