= Tam Dương =

- Commune
- Interactive map of Tam Dương
- Coordinates: 21.375275819681356°N 105.5431976254883°E
- Country: Vietnam
- Region: Northeast
- Province: Phú Thọ
- Established: 16 June 2025
- Administrative headquarters: Phố Me Hamlet, National Route 2C

Area
  - Total: 44.30 km^{2} (17.10 sq mi)

Population (2025)
  - Total: 47,936
  - Density: 1,082/km^{2} (2,800/sq mi)
- Postal code: 15219
- Website: tamduong.phutho.gov.vn

Tam Dương is a commune in Phú Thọ province, Vietnam.

On 16 June 2025, the National Assembly of Vietnam adopted Resolution No. 203/2025/QH15 amending and supplementing several articles of the Constitution of Vietnam, which provided for the termination of district-level administrative units nationwide from 1 July 2025.

On the same date, the Standing Committee of the National Assembly of Vietnam issued Resolution No. 1676/NQ-UBTVQH15 on the arrangement of commune-level administrative units in Phú Thọ province in 2025. Under the resolution, the entire area and population of Hợp Hòa township, Kim Long township, Hướng Đạo commune, and Đạo Tú commune were merged to form a new commune named Tam Dương.
