= Kỳ Cùng River =

River in Vietnam

The Kỳ Cùng (Vietnamese: Sông Kỳ Cùng) is a major river of northeastern Vietnam. It flows through Lạng Sơn Province. Tributaries include the Bắc Giang River and the Bắc Khê River. The source of the river is at an altitude of 1166 metres in northern Đình Lập District. Historically the valleys in which the river passes through have been important for agricultural production and were inhabited for centuries by the Bac Son peoples. During the Lý dynasty an extensive market for trade between the Vietnamese and the Chinese was established at Lạng Sơn on the Kỳ Cùng River.

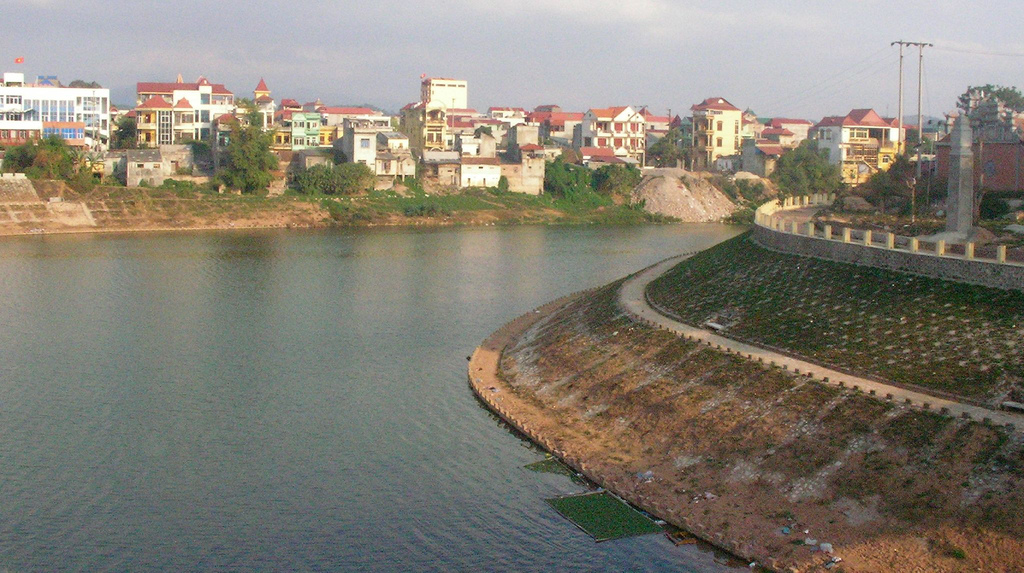
Kỳ Cùng River in Lạng Sơn
