= Ba Bể =

Coordinates: 19°35′N 105°39′E

- Commune and village
- Interactive map of Ba Bể
- Country: Vietnam
- Province: Thái Nguyên Province
- Time zone: UTC+07:00

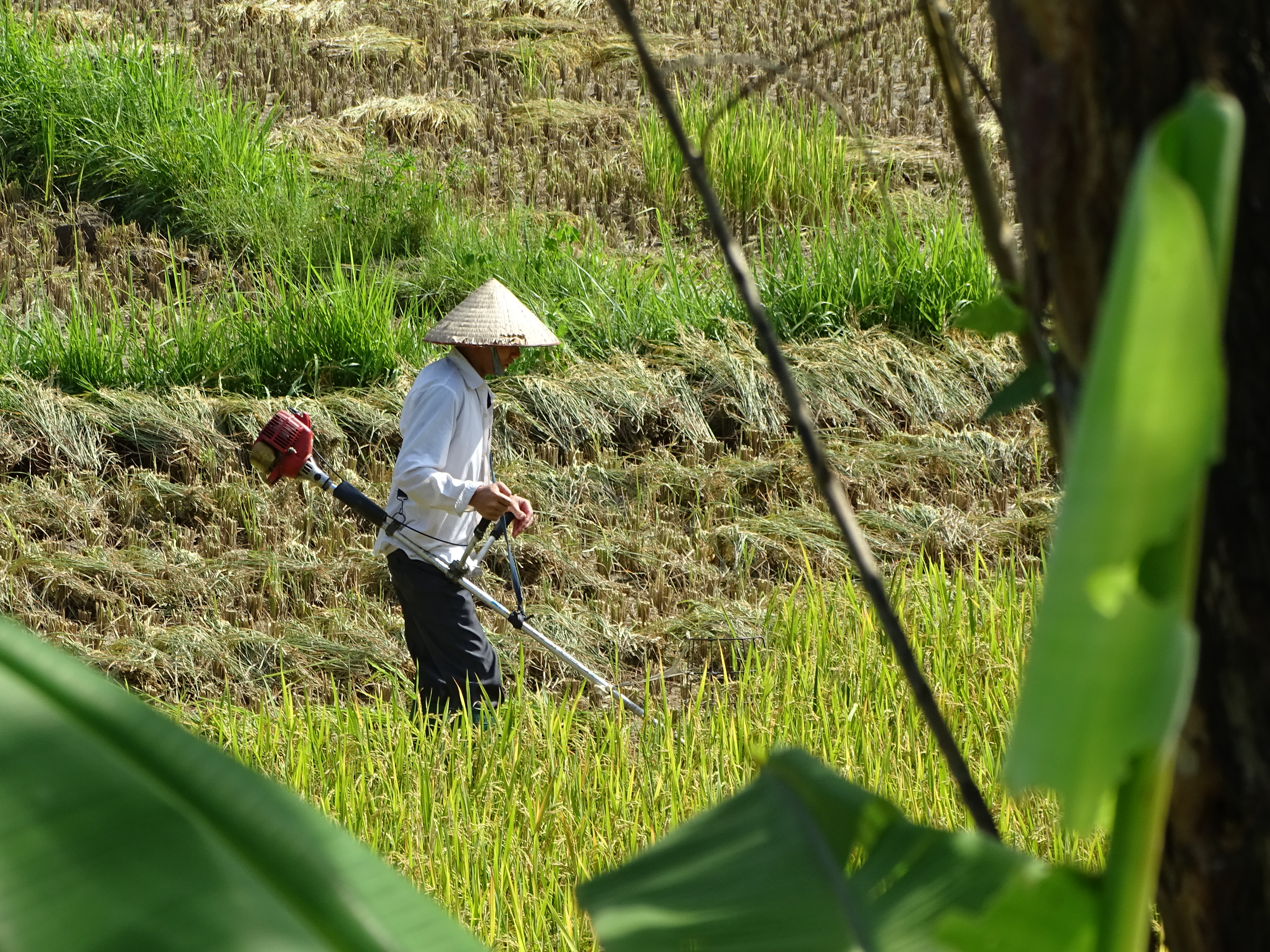
Man Harvesting Rice - Ba Bể Commune

Ba Bể is a commune (xã) and village in Thái Nguyên Province, in Vietnam.

In June 2025, Ba Bể Commune was established through the merger of the entire natural area and population of Cao Thượng Commune (natural area: 39.25 km²; population: 4,416), Nam Mẫu Commune (natural area: 64.46 km²; population: 2,717), and Khang Ninh Commune (natural area: 44.37 km²; population: 4,640) of Ba Bể District.
