= Tam Đảo =

- Commune
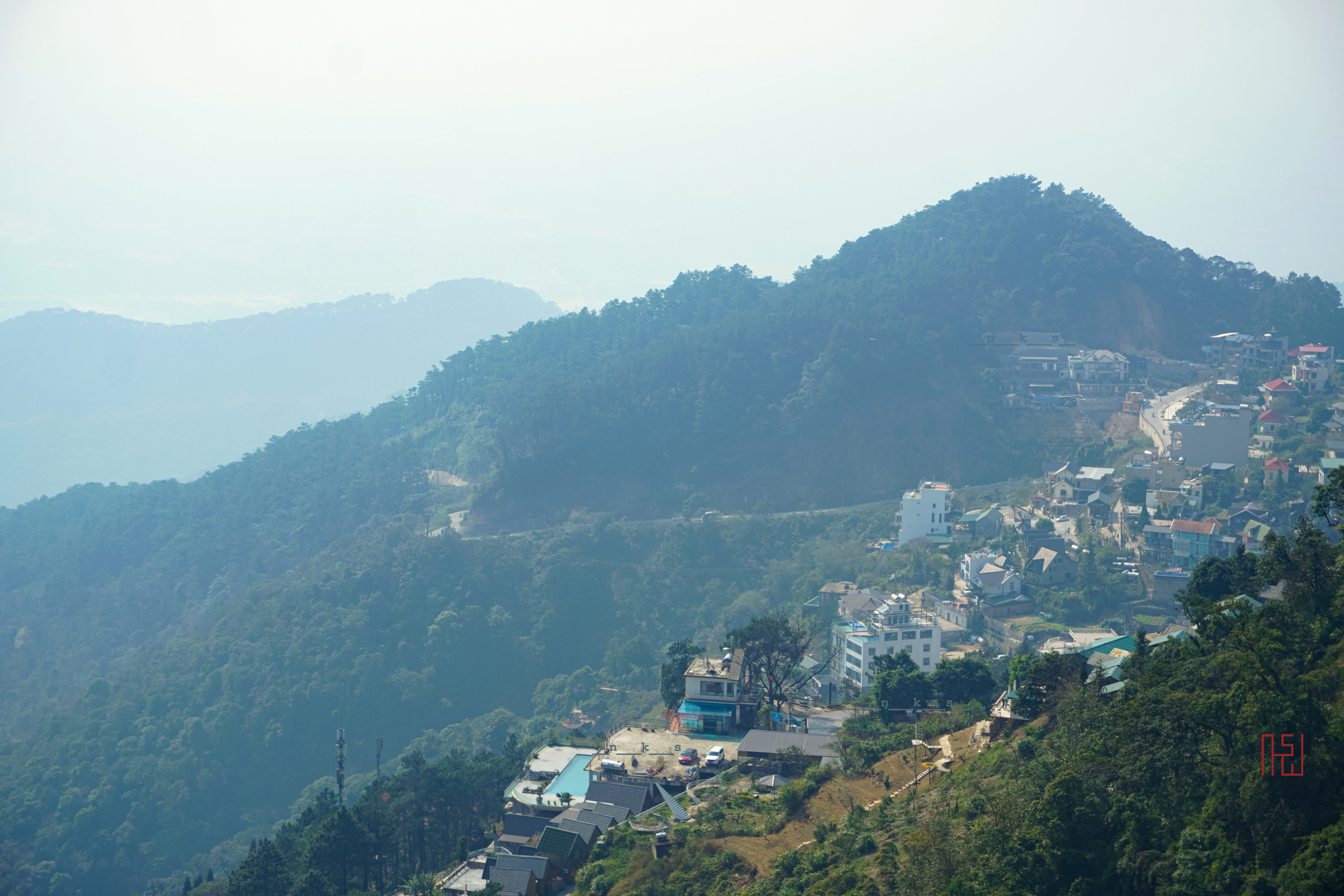
- A view of Tam Đảo commune
- Interactive map of Tam Đảo
- Coordinates: 21.394191447587406°N 105.61568082442102°E
- Country: Vietnam
- Region: Northeast
- Province: Phú Thọ
- Established: 16 June 2025
- Administrative headquarters: Đồi Thông Hamlet

Area
  - Total: 41.32 km^{2} (15.95 sq mi)

Population (31 December 2024)
  - Total: 97,438
  - Density: 2,358/km^{2} (6,110/sq mi)
- Website: tamdao.phutho.gov.vn

Tam Đảo is a commune in Phú Thọ province, Vietnam.

On 16 June 2025, the National Assembly of Vietnam adopted Resolution No. 203/2025/QH15 amending and supplementing several articles of the Constitution of Vietnam, which provided for the termination of district-level administrative units nationwide from 1 July 2025.

On the same date, the Standing Committee of the National Assembly of Vietnam issued Resolution No. 1676/NQ-UBTVQH15 on the arrangement of commune-level administrative units in Phú Thọ province in 2025. Under the resolution, the entire area and population of Hợp Châu township, Tam Đảo township, Hồ Sơn commune, and Minh Quang commune were merged to form a new commune named Tam Đảo.
