= Sông Lô district =

Sông Lô District Huyện Sông Lô
- District
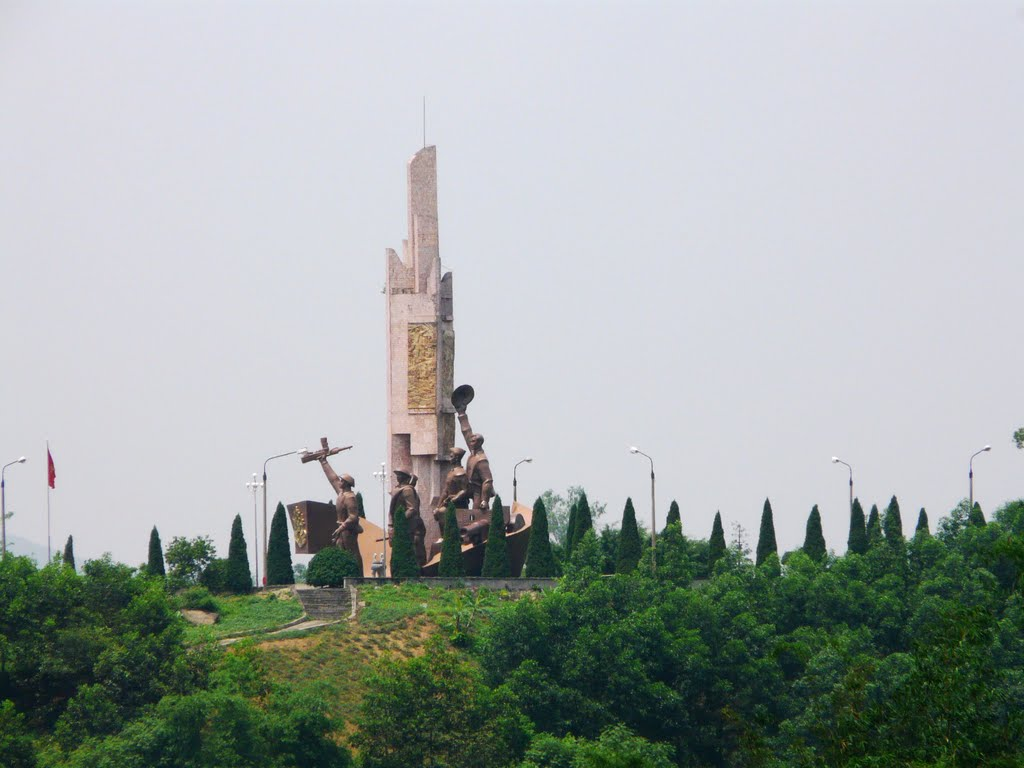
- Sông Lô Tower
- Interactive map of Sông Lô District
- Coordinates: 21°26′10″N 105°24′35″E
- Country: Vietnam
- Region: Red River Delta
- Province: Vĩnh Phúc
- Capital: Tam Sơn

Area
  - Total: 58.0 sq mi (150.3 km^{2})

Population (2008)
  - Total: 93,984
- Time zone: UTC+7 (UTC + 7)

Sông Lô was a district of the former Vĩnh Phúc province in northern Vietnam. The district was established in January 2009 and named after the Lô River. Tam Sơn township was the district seat.

Sông Lô was subdivided into 1 township (thị trấn) and 16 communes (xã). Communes: Bạch Lưu, Hải Lựu, Đôn Nhân, Quang Yên, Lãng Công, Nhân Đạo, Phương Khoan, Đồng Quế, Nhạo Sơn, Như Thuỵ, Yên Thạch, Tân Lập, Tứ Yên, Đồng Thịnh, Đức Bác, Cao Phong.

As of December 2008, Sông Lô had a population of 93,984. The district covered an area of 150.3 km^{2}.
