= Vĩnh Tường district =

Vĩnh Tường District Huyện Vĩnh Tường
- District
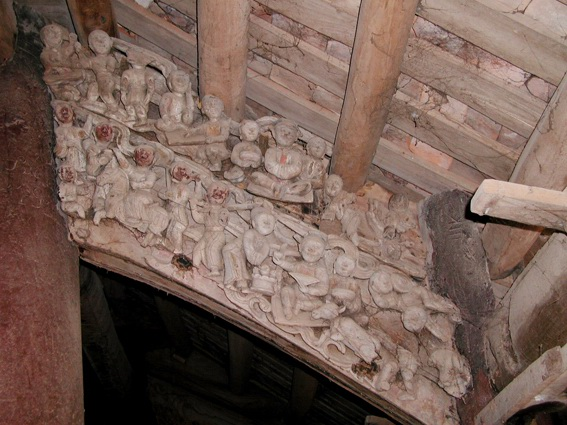

- Seal
- Motto: Vinh Tuong Native Rice (Quê Lúa Vĩnh Tường)
- Interactive map of Vĩnh Tường District
- Country: Vietnam
- Region: Red River Delta
- Province: Vĩnh Phúc
- Main town: Vĩnh Tường town

Government
  - Type: People's Committee
  - President of the People's Committee: Bùi Minh Hồng

Area
  - Total: 55 sq mi (142 km^{2})

Population (2003)
  - Total: 189,970
- Time zone: UTC+7 (UTC + 7)

Vĩnh Tường is a former rural district of Vĩnh Phúc province in the Red River Delta region of northern Vietnam. As of 2003, the district had a population of 189,970.

== Geography ==
The district covers an area of 142 km^{2}. The district capital lies at Vĩnh Tường. It borders Yên Lạc district (east), Lập Thạch district and Vĩnh Yên city (north), Việt Trì city of Phú Thọ Province (west), Ba Vì district of Hà Nội (west, separated by the Red River), Phúc Thọ district & Sơn Tây city of Hà Nội (south, separated by the Red River).

Vĩnh Tường includes 3 towns (thị trấn) and 26 communes (xã):

=== Towns ===
- Vĩnh Tường (main town, administrative center)
- Thổ Tang (Trade Center)
- Tứ Trưng

=== Communes ===
- Vĩnh Ninh
- Phú Đa
- Lũng Hoà
- Tân Cương
- Đại Đồng
- Cao Đại
- Tuân Chính
- Bồ Sao
- Vĩnh Sơn
- Bình Dương
- Vân Xuân
- Tam Phúc
- Phú Thịnh
- Lý Nhân
- An Tường
- Vĩnh Thịnh
- Yên Bình
- Tân Tiến
- Vũ Di
- Thượng Trưng
- Chấn Hưng
- Ngũ Kiên
- Kim Xá
- Yên Lập
- Việt Xuân
- Nghĩa Hưng

== Economy ==
The district's main occupation is agriculture. The main products are rice, maize and soya. The district hosts many craft villages, such as Bích Chu and Thủ Độ (carpentry), Lý Nhân (blacksmith), and Thổ Tang (wholesale trade).

== Notable residents ==
- Hồ Xuân Hương (1772–1822), poet
- Nguyễn Viết Xuân, artillery commander and revolutionary martyr
- Lê Xoay, revolutionary martyr)

== Culture ==
Most residents have no religion, although ancestor worship is widespread. Traditional festivals are celebrated along with a regional festival. It includes 18 communes.

The two main dishes are Chưng cake (square or cylinder glutinous rice green cake, filled with green bean paste and fat pork) and Dày cake (round sticky rice white cake). They are made from glutinous rice. Many expatriates visit their homeland.
