= Bắc Giang River =

River in Vietnam

Coordinates: 22°8′1.4″N 106°19′23.6″E

The Bắc Giang River (Vietnamese: Sông Bắc Giang) is a left tributary of the Kỳ Cùng River. It is 114 km long with a catchment area of 2670 km^{2} and flows through Lạng Sơn province and Bắc Kạn province in northeastern Vietnam. The river originates in Bắc Sơn district in Lạng Sơn province and flows in a northwesterly direction.
