= Bình Nguyên =

Coordinates: 21°17′N 105°39′E

- Commune
- Location of Bình Nguyên in Vietnam
- Country: Vietnam
- Province: Phú Thọ
- Established: 2025

Area
  - Total: 30.60 km^{2} (11.81 sq mi)

Population (2025)
  - Total: 46,425
  - Density: 1,517/km^{2} (3,929/sq mi)
- Time zone: UTC+7

Bình Nguyên (Vietnamese: [hɨəŋ˧˧ kaːŋ]) is a commune Phú Thọ Province, Northern Midlands and Mountains region of Vietnam.

On June 16, 2025, the Standing Committee of the National Assembly issued Resolution No. 1680/NQ-UBTVQH15 on the reorganization of commune-level administrative units in Phú Thọ Province in 2025. Accordingly, Hương Canh Township, together with Tam Hợp Commune, Quất Lưu Commune, and Sơn Lôi Commune, were merged to form a new commune named Bình Nguyên Commune.

== Economy ==
Bình Nguyên is known for its traditional pottery craft dating back over 300 years.
