= Northeast (Vietnam) =

Region of Vietnam

Coordinates: 21°42′05″N 106°13′17″E

Northeast Vietnamese: Đông Bắc Bộ
- Location of the Đông Bắc (Northeast) region in Vietnam at top yellow
- Country: Vietnam

Area
  - Total: 50,826.38 km^{2} (19,624.18 sq mi)

Population (2022)
  - Total: 9,474,710
  - Density: 186.413/km^{2} (482.808/sq mi)

GDP
  - Total: VND 348 trillion US$ 15.3 billion (2021)
- Time zone: UTC+7 (UTC +7)
- HDI (2022): 0.685 high · 4th

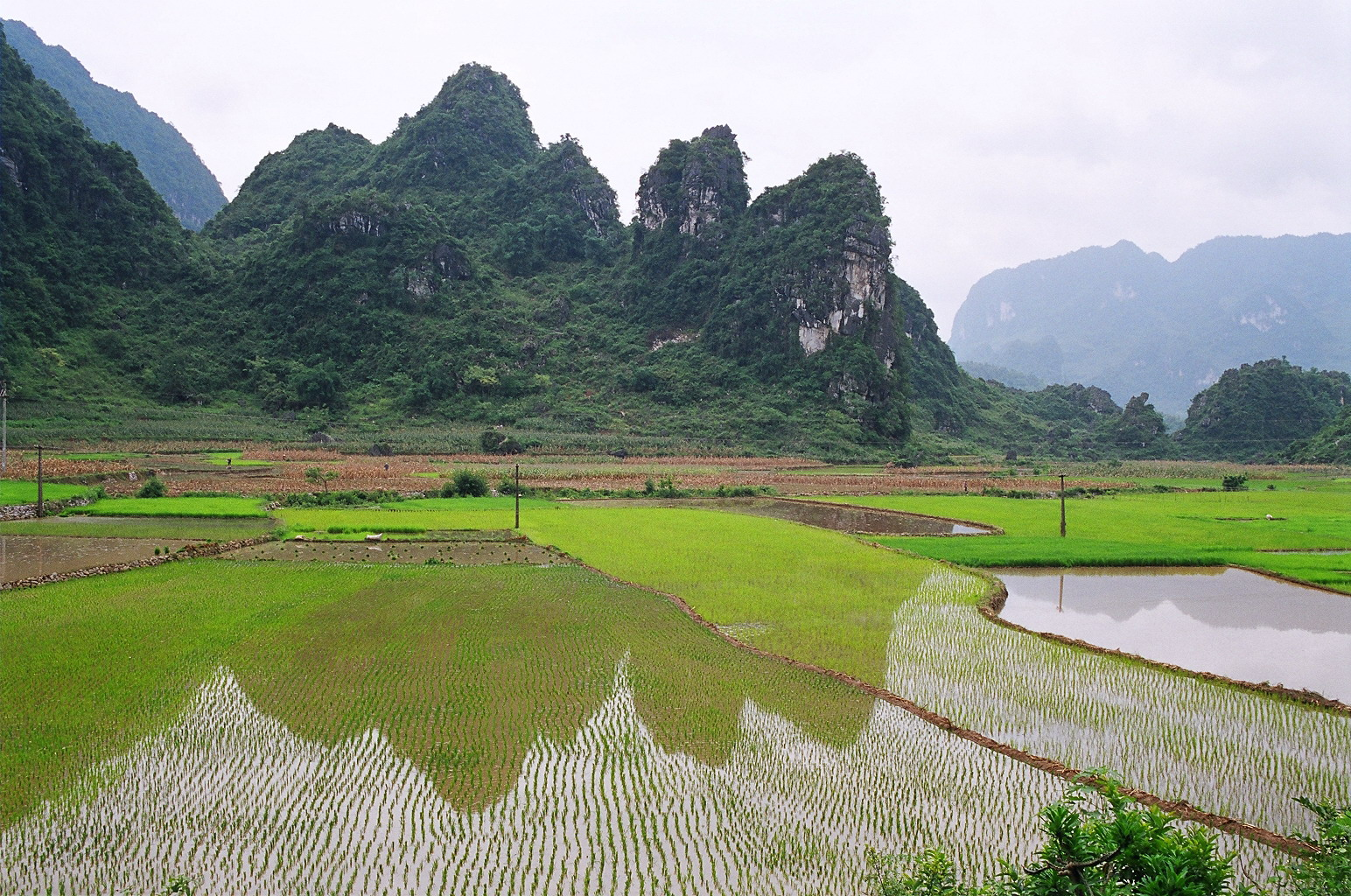
Cao Bằng province in Đông Bắc

The Northeast (Vietnamese: Đông Bắc Bộ) is a geographic subregion of Vietnam, located north of the Red River Delta, west of the Northwest and south of Vietnam's border with China. The Northeast is one of the two sub-regions which make up the Northern Midland and Mountainous Regions of Northern Vietnam.

== Geography ==
Geographical boundaries to the west of the Northeast are not clear, mainly due to the lack of consensus about the geography of Vietnam on the boundary between the Northwest and Northeast to be the Red River or the Hoàng Liên Sơn. The Northeast is limited to the north and east by the Vietnam-China border, while the Southeast overlooks the Gulf of Tonkin. The southern limit is composed of the Tam Đảo mountain range and the Red River Delta.

It is also mountainous in the midlands, the mountainous include massifs, and limestone mountains.

The western side, is limited by the Red River valley and the Chảy River's source, above, is composed of granite, slate and limestone plateau. In essence, this is the edge of the Yunnan Plateau. The high mountains of the Northeast are concentrated here, as Tây Côn Lĩnh, Kiêu Liêu Ti.

The northern part junction with Vietnam-China border are the plateau (highland) turns from west to east are: Bắc Hà, Quản Bạ, Đồng Văn. Two first plateau has an average elevation of 1000-1200m. Đồng Văn Plateau is 1600m. Rivers and streams flowing through the plateau created long and deep canyons. There are also some small plains, like Thất Khê, Lạng Sơn, Lộc Bình, and Cao Bằng.

To the east, from the Gâm River's middle into the sea, which is lower than many mountains arc turned eastward turn from east to west is the Gâm River's anticline, Ngân Sơn-Yên Lạc Bow, Bắc Sơn Massif, Đông Triều Mountain range. Mountains rising above the sea form the famous scenery of Hạ Long. The arc of these mountains are mostly covered tail at Tam Đảo.

Southwest, from Phú Thọ, southern Tuyên Quang, southern Yên Bái and Thái Nguyên, lower toward the plain. It is called as the "midlands". The height of this section is about 100–150 m.

The Northeast has many rivers flow through, including the major river of the Red, Chảy, Lô, Gâm (the Red rivers system), Cầu, Thương, Lục Nam (in Thái Bình river system), Bằng, Bắc Giang, Kỳ Cùng...

Northeast's sea region has many large and small islands, nearly 2/3 the number of Vietnam's sea islands (including the Hoàng Sa and Trường Sa).

== History ==
During the multiple eras of Vietnam under Chinese rule, this region was often controlled by Chinese dynasties for almost a thousand years, beginning from the Han dynasty when they had conquered Nanyue. It left a legacy whereby this region is the most heavily sinicized in Vietnam. Even today, many cross-border changes occur with the contemporary People's Republic of China (PRC). Many of the individuals who live here have partial Chinese ancestry, and it is not uncommon for Chinese languages to be heard in this region, such as in cities like Lạng Sơn (谅山) and Móng Cái (芒街).

== Provinces ==
Statistics of Northeast Vietnam (Đông Bắc)
Province- Level Division	Capital	Population (2025)	Area (in km^{2})
Bắc Giang	Bắc Giang	2,057,918	3,895.89
Bắc Kạn	Bắc Kạn	365,318	4,853.25
Cao Bằng	Cao Bằng	573,119	6,700.39
Hà Giang	Hà Giang	944,083	7,927.55
Lạng Sơn	Lạng Sơn	881,384	8,310.18
Phú Thọ	Việt Trì	1,694,771	3,534.56
Quảng Ninh	Hạ Long	1,497,447	6,207.95
Thái Nguyên	Thái Nguyên	1,434,171	3,521.97
Tuyên Quang	Tuyên Quang	921,187	5,867.95

- The two provinces Lào Cai and Yên Bái are usually seen as part of the Northwest region.

== Gallery ==
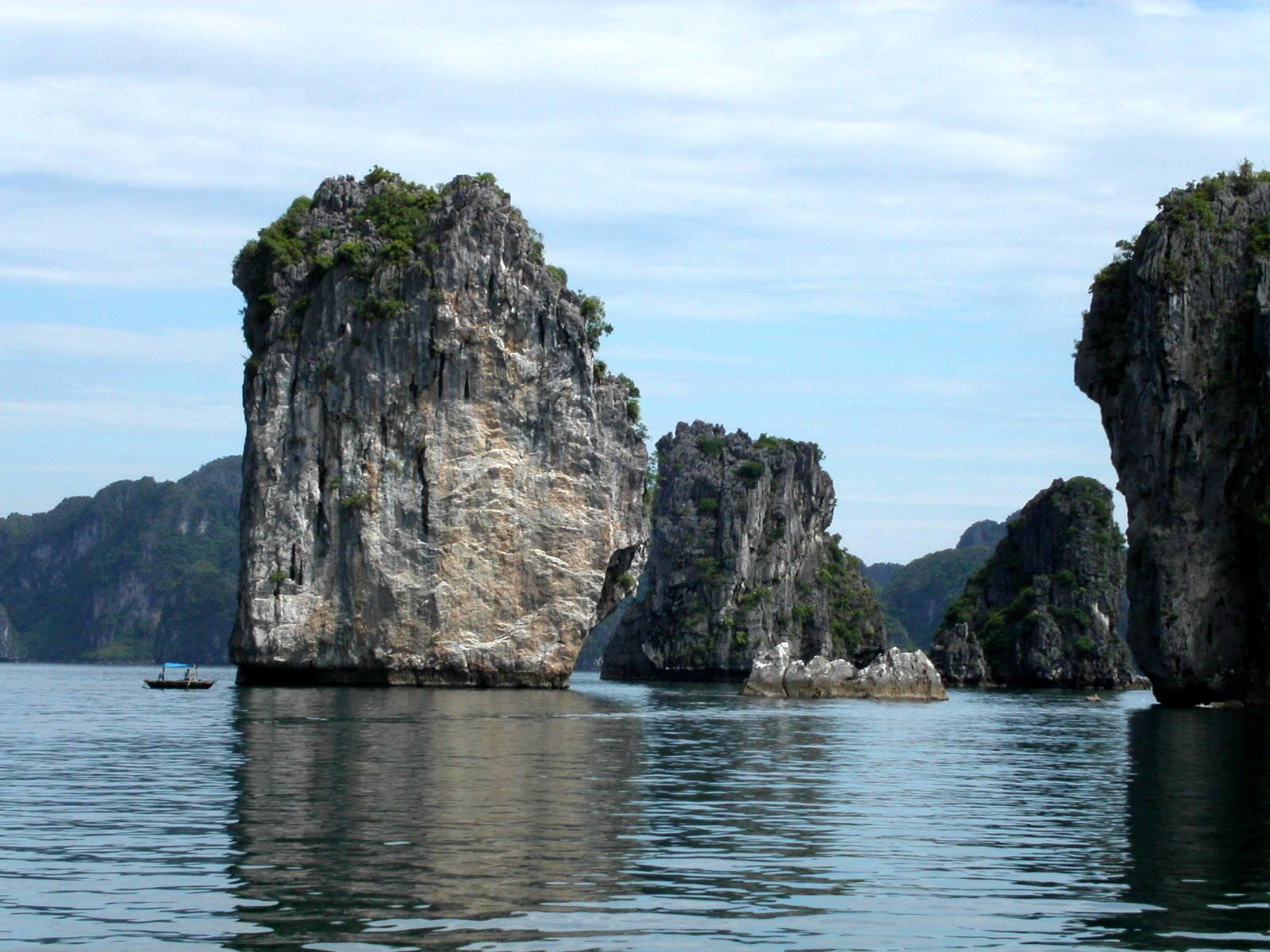
Vịnh Hạ Long

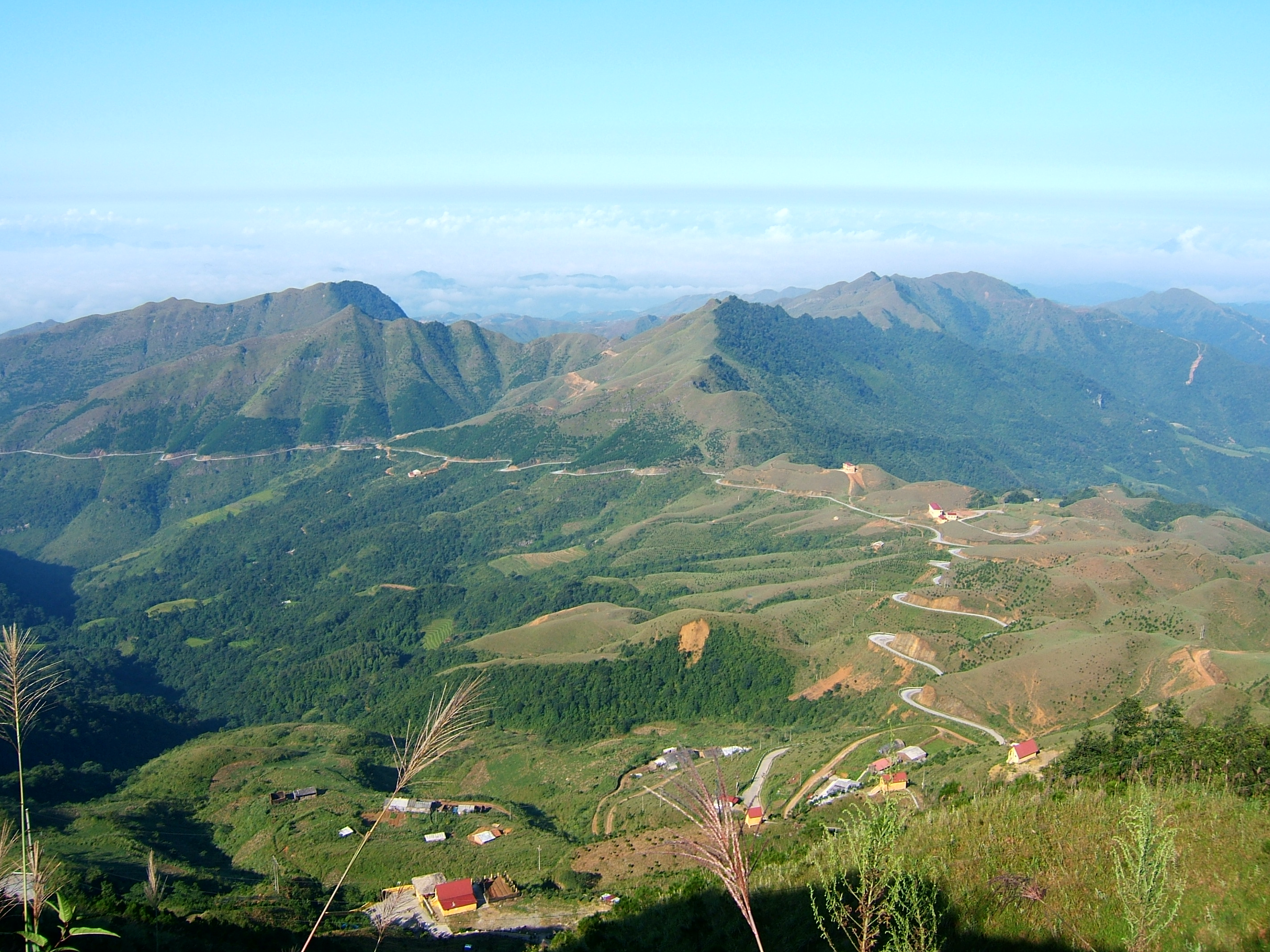
Mẫu Sơn mountains

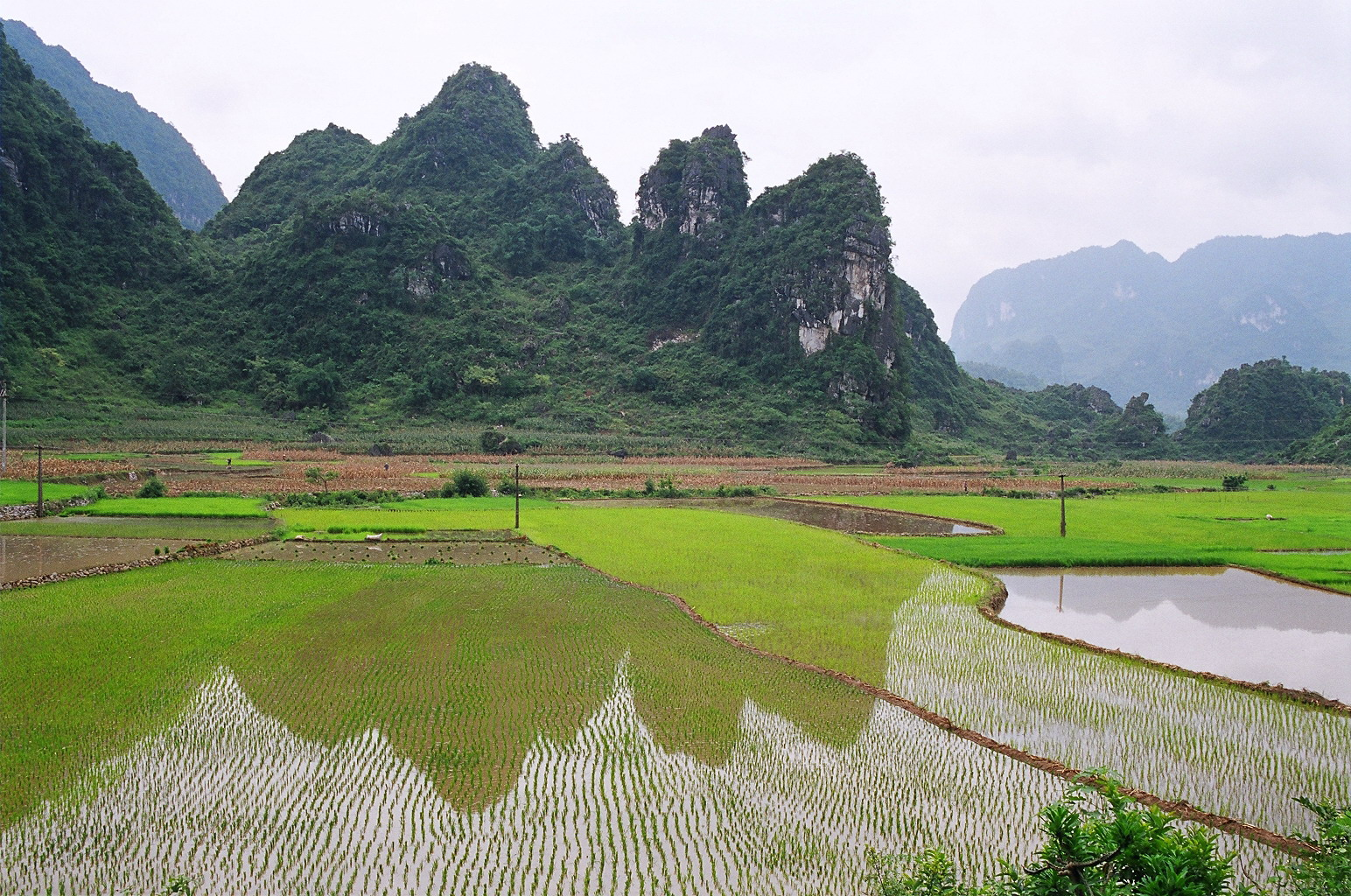
Rice fields in Cao Bằng

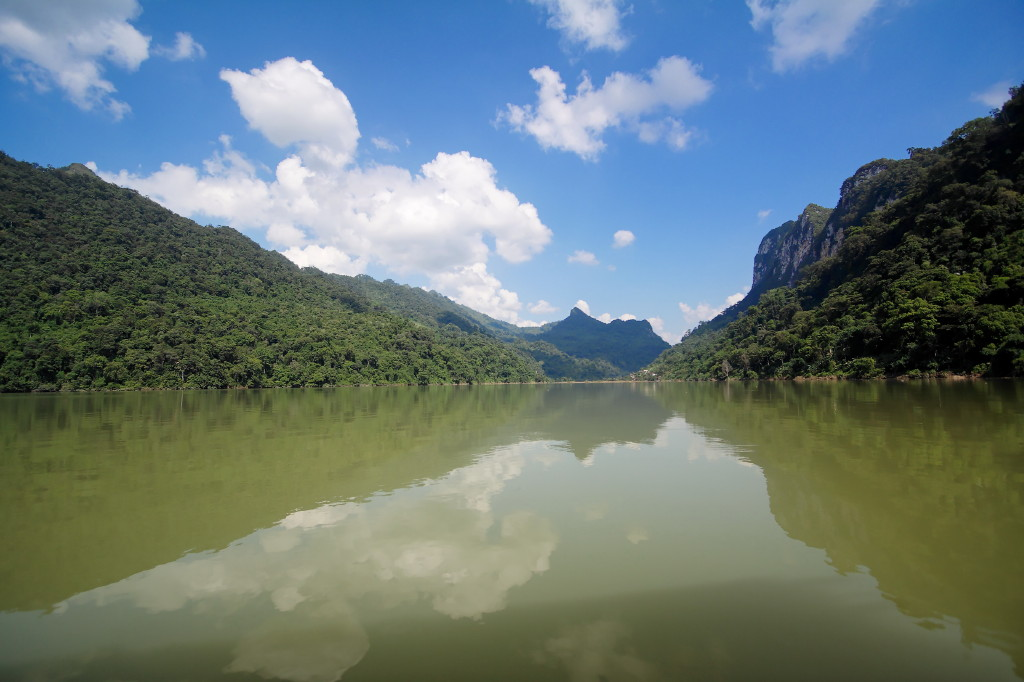
Ba Bể Lake in Bắc Kạn

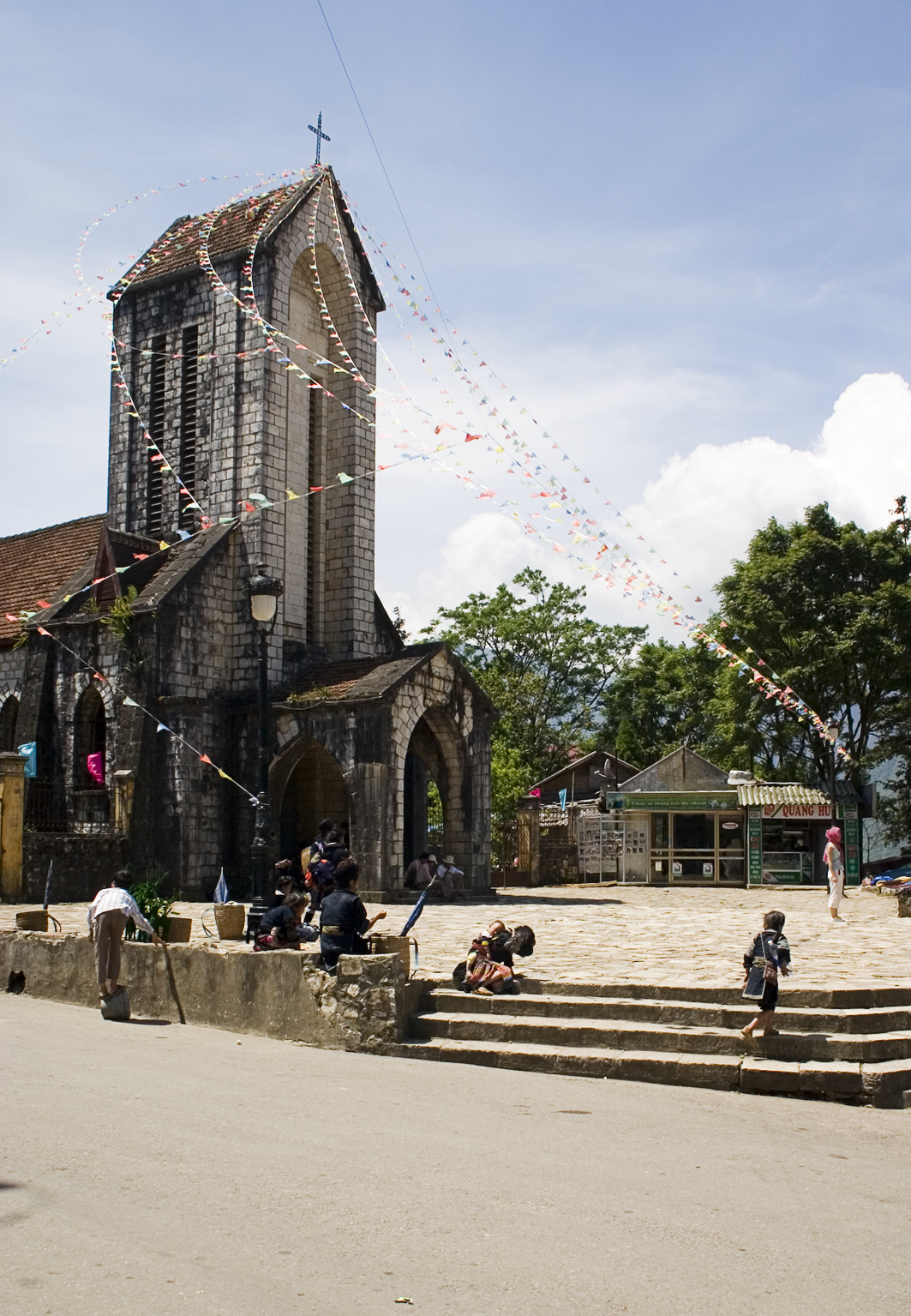
Church at Sa Pa

== See also ==
- Provinces of Vietnam
