= Vĩnh Phúc province =

Province of Vietnam

Vĩnh Phúc
- Province
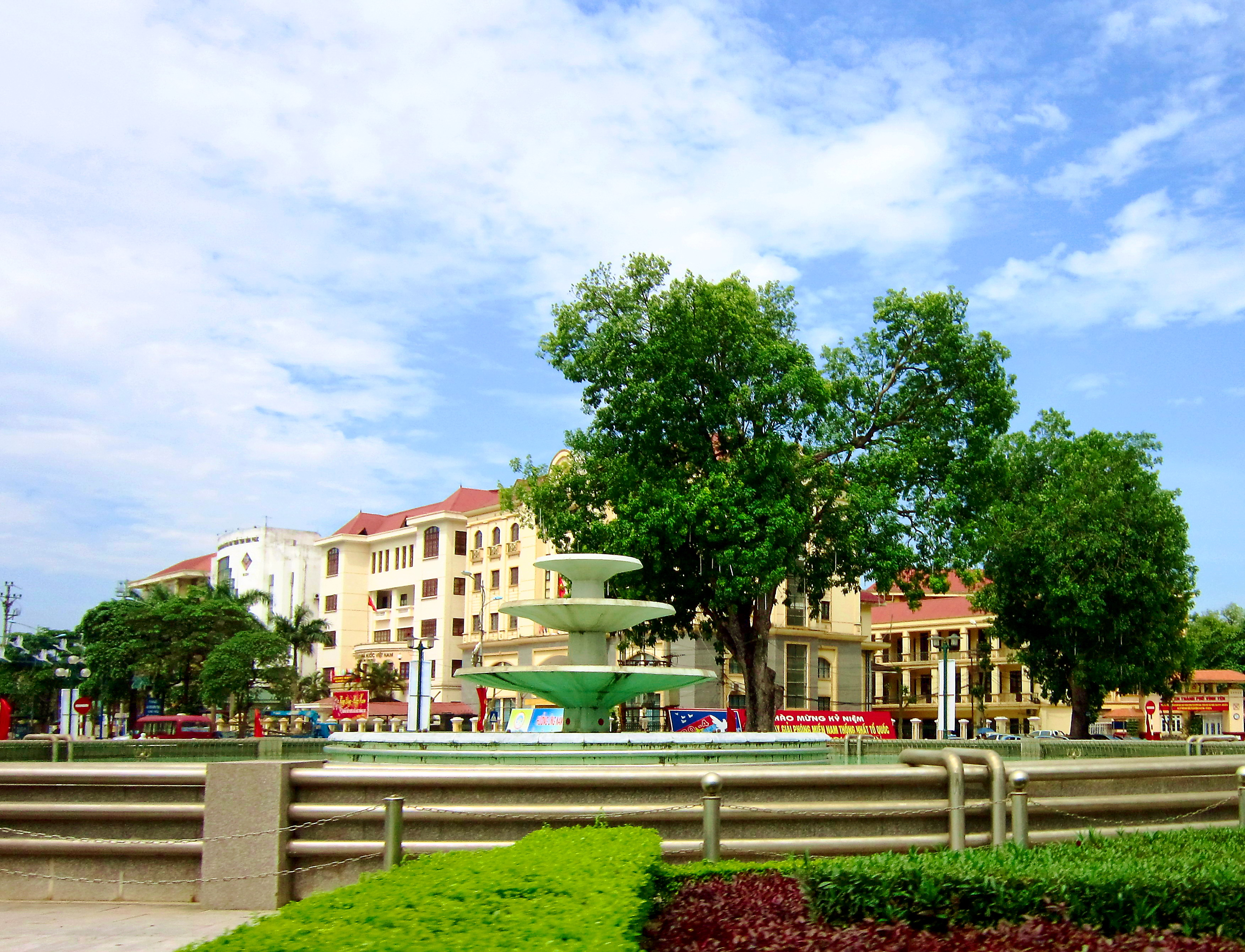
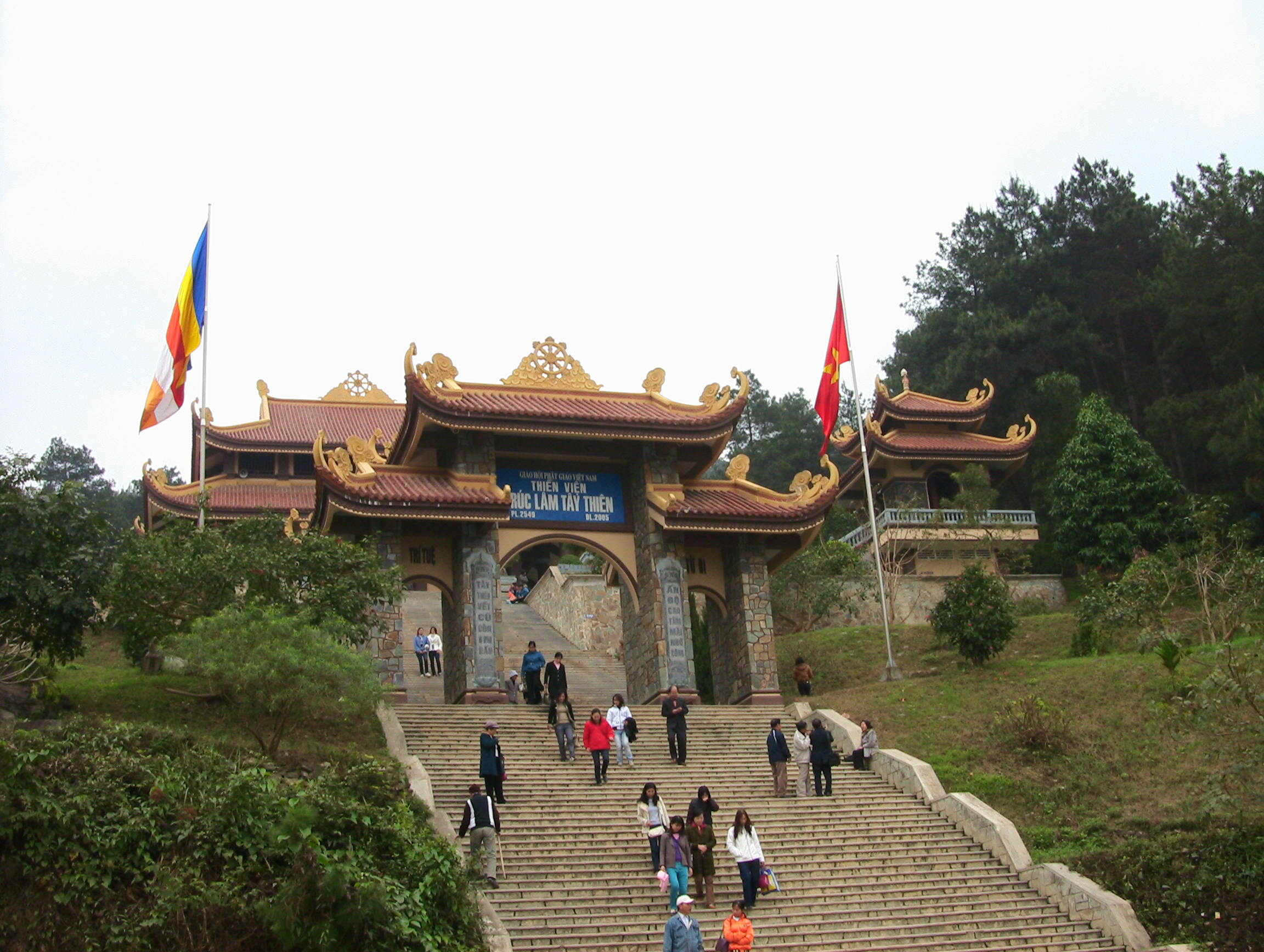
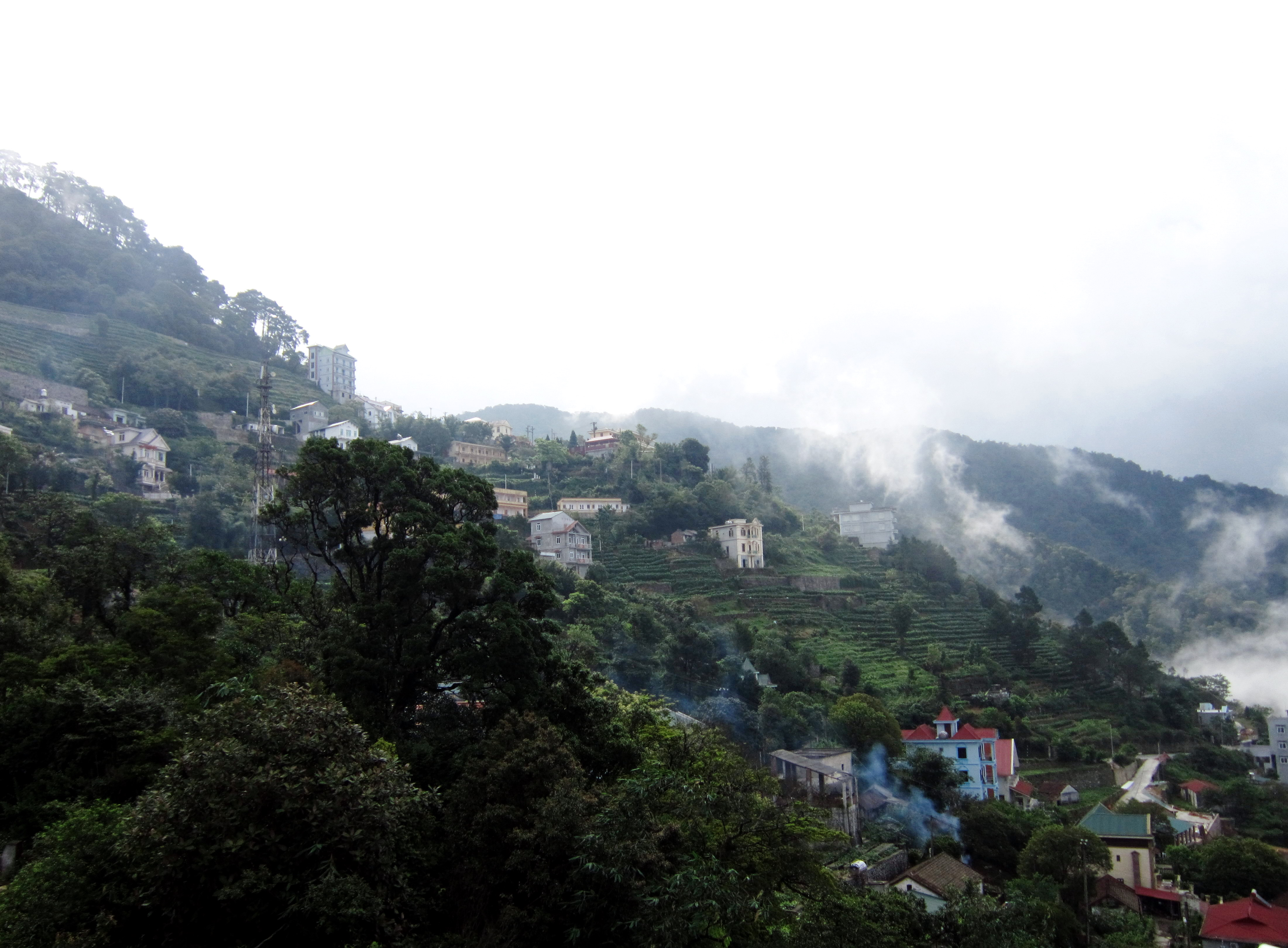
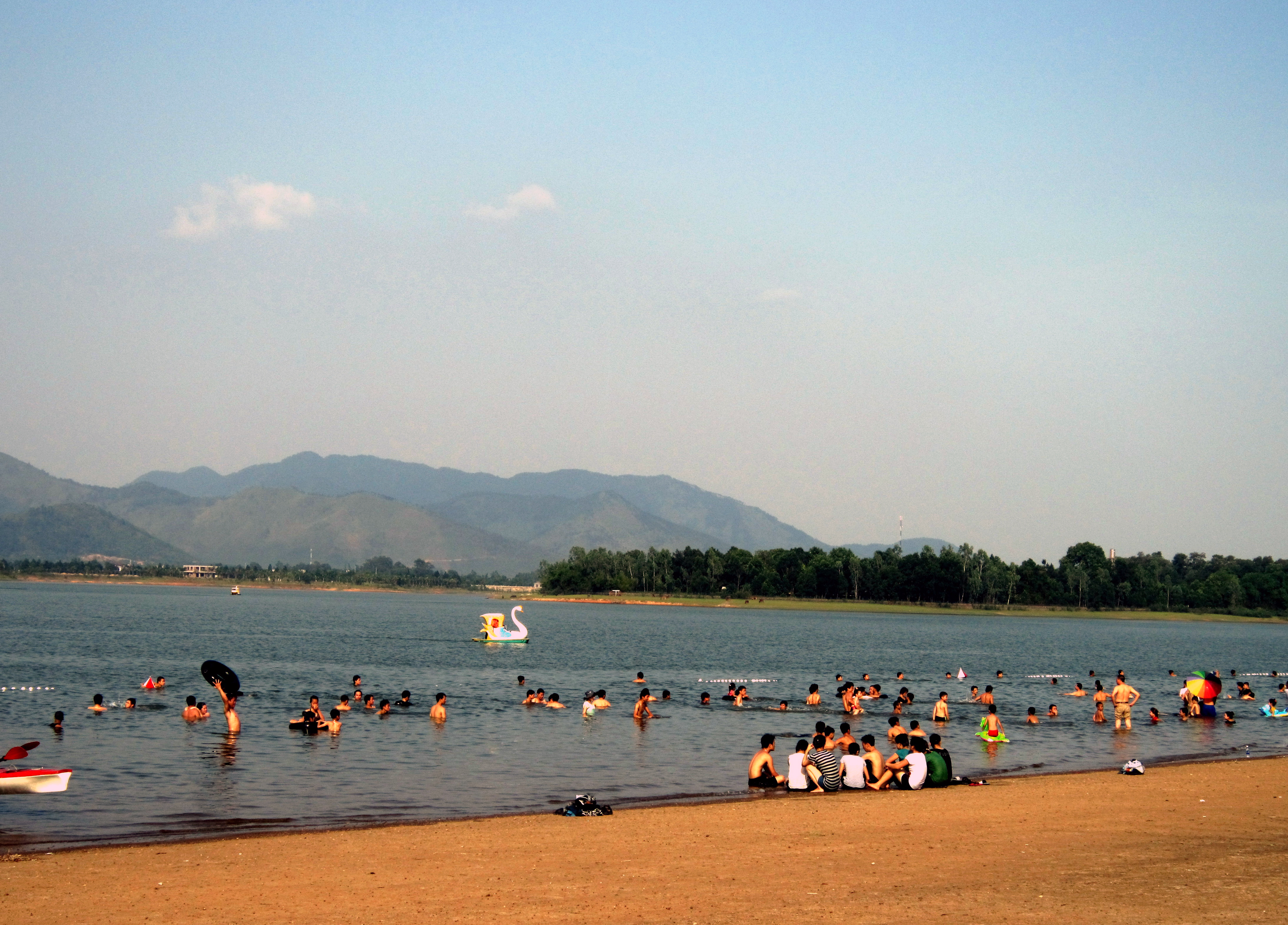
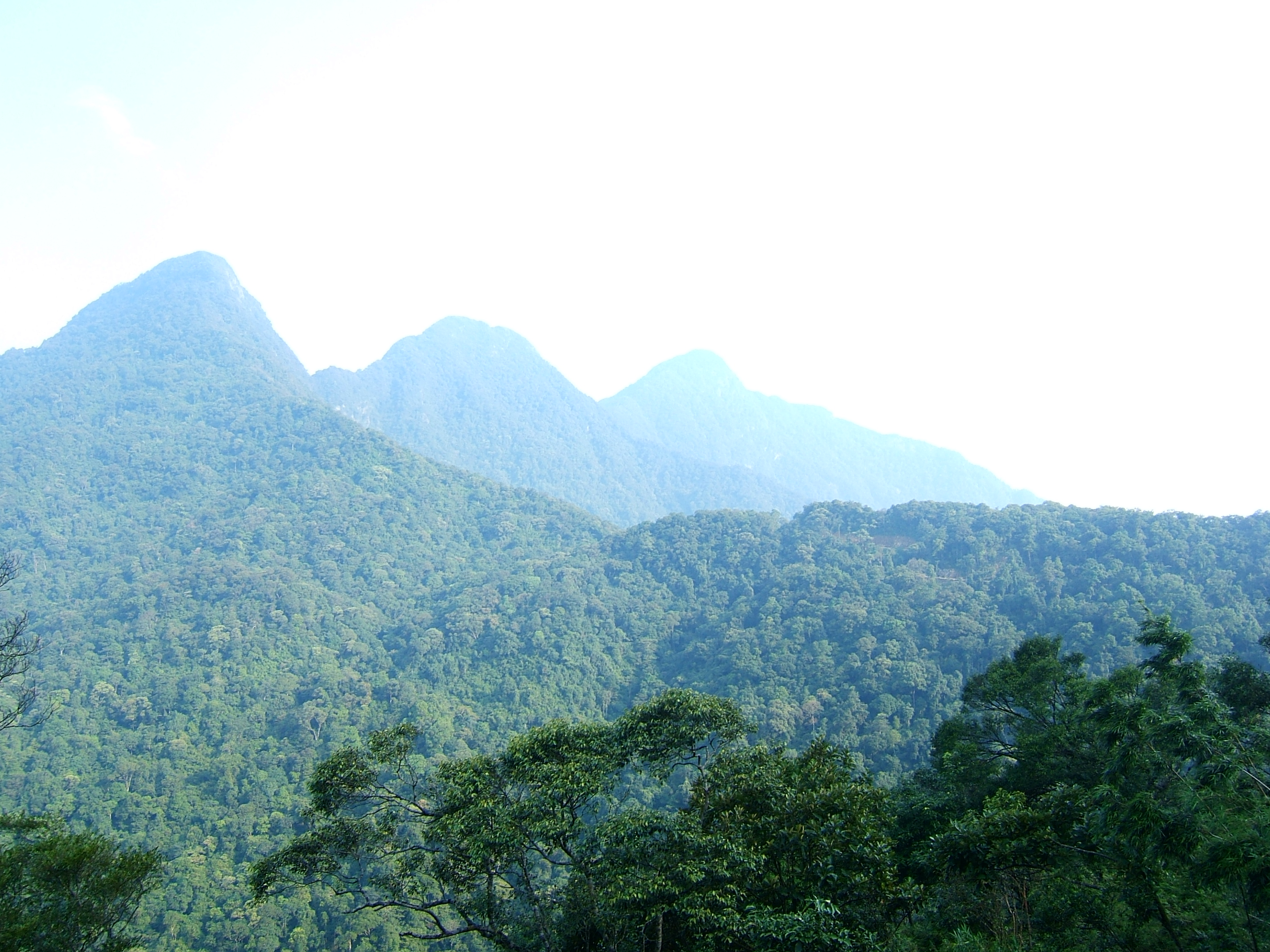
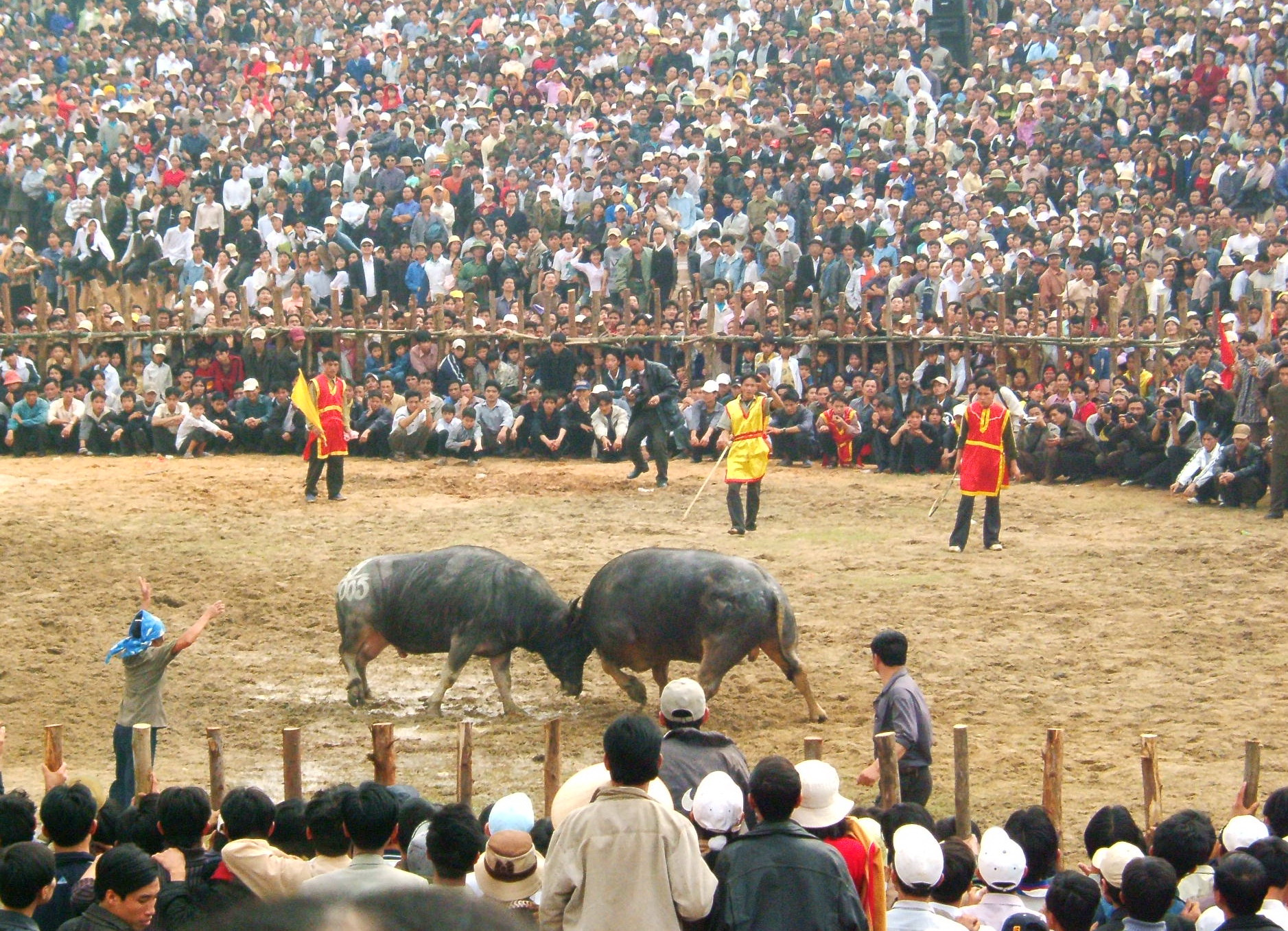
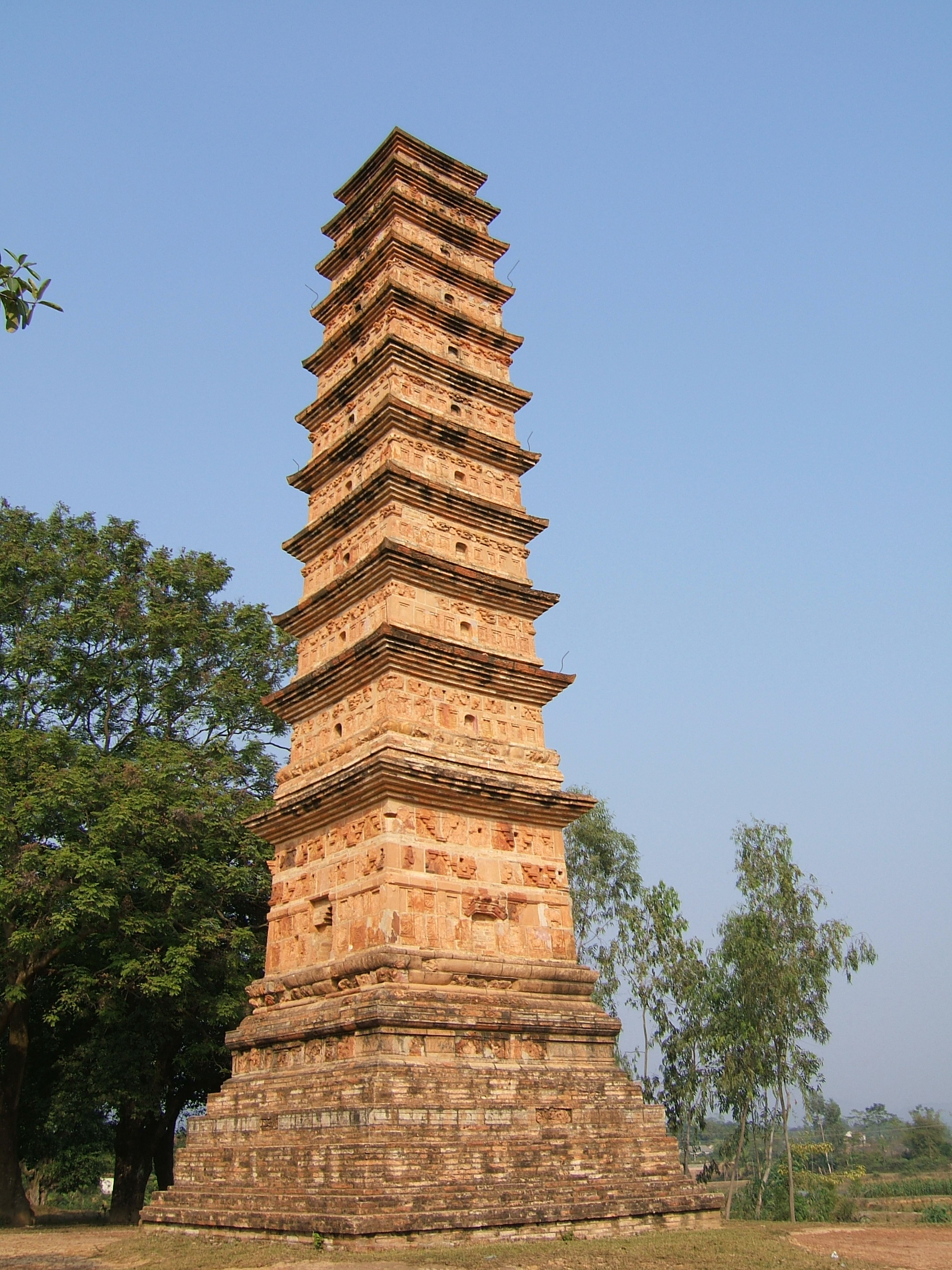
- Post Office Vĩnh Phúc • Zen Monastery Trúc Lâm Tây Thiên • Tam Đảo Mountain • Lake Đại Lải • Tam Đảo National Park • Buffalo fighting festival • Bình Sơn Pagoda

- Seal
- Nickname: Fortune
- Location of Vĩnh Phúc within Vietnam
- Coordinates: 21°18′N 105°36′E
- Country: Vietnam
- Region: Red River Delta
- Capital: Vĩnh Yên

Government
  - People's Council Chair: Trịnh Đình Dũng
  - People's Committee Chair: Nguyễn Ngọc Phi

Area
  - Total: 1,236.00 km^{2} (477.22 sq mi)

Population (2025)
  - Total: 1,347,578
  - Density: 1,090.27/km^{2} (2,823.80/sq mi)

Demographics
  - Ethnicities: Vietnamese, Sán Dìu, Sán Chay, Tày

GDP
  - Total: VND 94.498 trillion US$ 4.104 billion
- Time zone: UTC+7 (ICT)
- Area codes: 211
- ISO 3166 code: VN-70
- HDI (2020): ▲0.778 (8th)
- Website: www.vinhphuc.gov.vn

Vĩnh Phúc was a former province in the Red River Delta of Northern Vietnam. It was dissolved and merged with Phú Thọ province on 1 July 2025.

== Administrative divisions ==
Vĩnh Phúc is subdivided into 8 district-level sub-divisions:

- 7 districts:
  - Sông Lô
  - Bình Xuyên
  - Lập Thạch
  - Tam Đảo
  - Tam Dương
  - Vĩnh Tường
  - Yên Lạc
- 2 provincial cities:
  - Vĩnh Yên (capital)
  - Phúc Yên

They are further subdivided into 12 commune-level towns (or townlets), 112 communes, and 13 wards.

== Specialty ==
Tay Dinh banh gio, also known as sun cake, is a famous Vinh Phuc specialty for a long time. This is an indispensable dish in traditional Tet holidays and some other holidays of the people of Tay Dinh - Vinh Phuc like banh chung. With long-standing accumulated experience, accompanied by the creativity of Tay Dinh villagers, they have created a specialty with bold flavors and unique features of Tay Dinh banh gio. The cake has a beautiful golden brown color. When eating, we can feel the aroma of rice and the chewiness of the cake, combined with sugar or molasses to create a characteristic sweet and cool taste.

Local specialties in Vĩnh Phúc also include Tam Đảo chayote, ant-bitten rare beef, and Lập Thạch fermented fish. Chayote is commonly grown in the Tam Đảo area. Ant-bitten beef is prepared by exposing beef to ants before grilling and Lập Thạch fermented fish is made by fermenting fish with roasted rice powder.

== Events ==
=== Closure of Sơn Lôi Commune during the COVID-19 pandemic ===
On February 13, 2020, Vĩnh Phúc province has decided to lock down Sơn Lôi Commune - a rural community of over 10,600 in Bình Xuyên District - for fourteen days as an effort to contain the disease caused by the Severe acute respiratory syndrome coronavirus 2 (SARS-CoV 2) virus. Seven of the total of sixteen people who contracted the virus in Vietnam are residents of Sơn Lôi Commune - including a three-month-old girl. Authorities have established mobile shops and provided food and face masks to the community.
