= Phúc Yên (disambiguation) =

Phúc Yên may refer to several places in Vietnam, including:

- Phúc Yên (city), a former city of Vĩnh Phúc Province
- Phúc Yên, a ward of Phú Thọ Province
