= Toyota Camry (XV50) =

Seventh generation of Toyota Camry

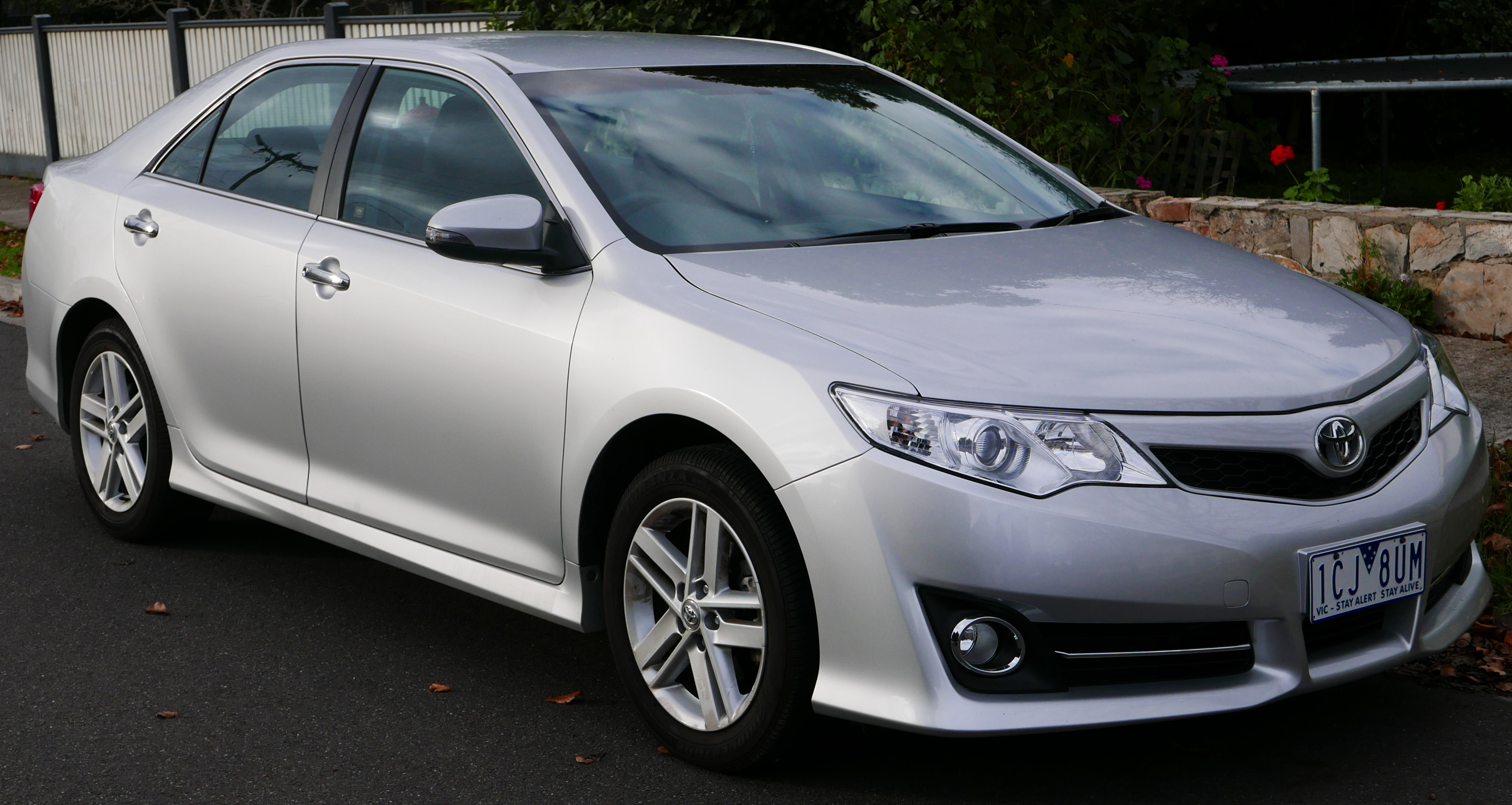
- Camry Atara S (Australia)

Overview
- Manufacturer: Toyota
- Also called: Daihatsu Altis (Prestige, Japan; 2012–2017); Toyota Aurion (Prestige, Australia & GCC; 2012–2017)
- Production: February 2012 – August 2017 (Aurion); August 2011 – May 2017 (Japan, US); October 2011 – October 2017 (Australia); November 2011 – December 2017 (China); November 2011 – March 2018 (Russia); December 2011 – August 2020 (Taiwan); March 2012 – September 2018 (Thailand); May 2012 – October 2018 (Malaysia); July 2012 – March 2019 (Vietnam); August 2012 – November 2018 (India)
- Model years: 2012–2017
- Assembly: Japan: Toyota, Aichi (Tsutsumi plant); Australia: Altona; China: Nansha, Guangzhou; India: Bidadi (TKML); Malaysia: Shah Alam (UMW Toyota Motor); Russia: Saint Petersburg; Taiwan: Zhongli (Kuozui Motors); Thailand: Chachoengsao; United States: Georgetown, Kentucky (TMMK); Lafayette, Indiana (SIA); Vietnam: Phúc Yên, Vĩnh Phúc
- Designer: Hirotada Kobayashi and Tomonori Matsumoto (regular: 2009); Kentarou Asakura (sports version, regular: 2009); Hirofumi Fukui and Kazumi Kowaki (prestige: 2009); Keisuke Matsuno (hybrid version, prestige: 2009); Matt Sperling and Kengo Iwanaga (facelift, regular: 2012)

Body and chassis
- Class: Mid-size car
- Body style: 4-door sedan
- Layout: Front-engine, front-wheel-drive
- Platform: Toyota K platform
- Related: Lexus ES (XV60); Toyota Avalon (XX40)

Powertrain
- Engine: 2.0 L 1AZ-FE VVT-i I4 145 hp; 2.0 L 6AR-FSE VVT-iW D-4S I4 165 hp (Malaysia, Thailand, Taiwan, Russia and China); 2.5 L 2AR-FE Dual VVT-i I4 178–181 hp; 2.5 L 5AR-FE Dual VVT-i I4 173 hp (China); 3.5 L 2GR-FE Dual VVT-i V6 268 hp; 2.5 L 2AR-FXE Dual VVT-i I4 154 hp Hybrid electric
- Electric motor: 105 kW (141 hp; 143 PS) 2JM permanent magnet synchronous (hybrid)
- Transmission: 4/6-speed automatic; 6-speed manual; eCVT (hybrid)
- Hybrid drivetrain: Series-parallel (HSD)
- Battery: 1.6 kWh Panasonic High voltage NiMH

Dimensions
- Wheelbase: 2,775 mm (109.3 in)
- Length: 4,865 mm (191.5 in) (US & Asia); 4,820 mm (189.8 in)
- Width: 1,820 mm (71.7 in)
- Height: 1,470 mm (57.9 in)
- Curb weight: 1,447 kg (3,190 lb) (LE); 1,470 kg (3,240 lb) (SE); 1,540 kg (3,395 lb) (XLE V6); 1,551 kg (3,420 lb) (SE V6)

Chronology
- Predecessor: Toyota Camry (XV40) (regular); Toyota Aurion (XV40) (prestige)
- Successor: Toyota Camry (XV70)

The Toyota Camry (XV50) is a mid-size car produced by Toyota from August 2011 to August 2020. Replacing the XV40 series, the XV50 represents the seventh generation of the Toyota Camry in all markets outside Japan, which follows a different generational lineage.

== Development ==
The XV50 Camry was introduced on 23 August 2011 and made its debut in the 2011 NASCAR Sprint Cup Series on 27 August 2011. It was released in Japan on 5 September 2011 and in the U.S. later that same month. The interior received a major restyling, while the exterior received all-new sheet metal and more angular styling. Power options are the 2.5-litre 2AR-FE 4-cylinder and the 3.5-litre 2GR-FE V6. The power output for the 2AR-FE was increased to 133 kW (178 hp) across the entire vehicle lineup while the power output for the V6 remained unchanged. EPA fuel economy numbers for both engines increased, with the V6 engine increased to 11 L/100 km; 25 mpg_{‑imp} (21 mpg_{‑US}) city cycle, 8 L/100 km; 36 mpg_{‑imp} (30 mpg_{‑US}) highway cycle and the 4-cylinder having 9 L/100 km; 30 mpg_{‑imp} (25 mpg_{‑US}) city cycle and 7 L/100 km; 42 mpg_{‑imp} (35 mpg_{‑US}) highway cycle. The engine produces 230 N⋅m (170 lbf⋅ft) of torque. Despite similar exterior dimensions with the XV40 Camry, Toyota was able to increase the interior volume by restyling the interior panels so that they followed the contour of the exterior panels.

The XV50 Camry is the first Camry to be offered in the U.S. without a manual transmission. The U.S. Camry has a 6-speed automatic transmission, with SE models featuring paddle shifters for manual shifts. eCVT is still offered on hybrid models. In Japan, the XV50 Camry is exclusive to Toyota Corolla Store locations.

In the US, Smart Entry, previously only standard on the Hybrid in the XV40 generation, became now standard on the SE V6 and XLE V6.

The 2013 model year Camry was released in Japan on 3 September 2012, but was delayed in the U.S. until late January 2013 due to power shortages in Japan caused by the 2011 Tōhoku earthquake and tsunami. For the first time, the Japanese market Camry did not use the "regular" Camry design used for the U.S. and Australian models. Instead, it adopts the "prestige" Camry or Aurion design that Southeast Asia and China have received.

== Engines ==
Chassis	Model	Engine	Power	Torque
XV50	ACV51	2.0 L 1AZ-FE inline-four (petrol)	145 hp (108 kW)	190 N⋅m (140 lb⋅ft)
XV50	ASV51	2.0 L 6AR-FSE inline-four (petrol)	165 hp (123 kW)	199 N⋅m (147 lb⋅ft)
XV50	ASV50	2.5 L 2AR-FE inline-four (petrol)	177 hp (132 kW) to 181 hp (135 kW)	231 N⋅m (170 lb⋅ft) to 235 N⋅m (173 lb⋅ft)
XV50	ASV50	2.5 L 5AR-FE inline-four (petrol)	177 hp (132 kW) to 181 hp (135 kW)	231 N⋅m (170 lb⋅ft) to 235 N⋅m (173 lb⋅ft)
XV50	AVV50	2.5 L 2AR-FXE inline-four (petrol)	158 hp (118 kW)	213 N⋅m (157 lb⋅ft)
XV50	GSV50	3.5 L 2GR-FE V6 (petrol)	268 hp (200 kW)	336 N⋅m (248 lb⋅ft)

== Safety ==
ANCAP test results Toyota Camry all petrol variants (2011)
Test	Score
Overall	5 /5 stars
Frontal offset	15.27/16
Side impact	16/16
Pole	2/2
Seat belt reminders	3/3
Whiplash protection	Adequate
Pedestrian protection	Marginal
Electronic stability control	Standard

ANCAP test results Toyota Camry Hybrid variants (2011)
Test	Score
Overall	5 /5 stars
Frontal offset	15.27/16
Side impact	16/16
Pole	2/2
Seat belt reminders	3/3
Whiplash protection	Adequate
Pedestrian protection	Marginal
Electronic stability control	Standard

ANCAP test results Toyota Camry all Hybrid variants (2011)
Test	Score
Overall	5 /5 stars
Frontal offset	14.37/16
Side impact	14.85/16
Pole	2/2
Seat belt reminders	2/3
Whiplash protection	Adequate
Pedestrian protection	Not Assessed
Electronic stability control	Standard

ANCAP test results Toyota Camry all variants (2013)
Test	Score
Overall	5 /5 stars
Frontal offset	14.37/16
Side impact	14.85/16
Pole	2/2
Seat belt reminders	3/3
Whiplash protection	Adequate
Pedestrian protection	Marginal
Electronic stability control	Standard

== Equipment ==
=== United States / Canada ===
The LE adds a touch screen radio. The SE model is fitted with a sport-tuned suspension, 17-inch alloy wheels (with 18-inch alloys on V6 models), fog lamps, a sunroof, a leather-wrapped steering wheel and shift knob, sport seats and shift paddles to differentiate it from the cheaper models. The XLE adds navigation, dual zone automatic climate control, rear seat vents and heated seats.

Prices in the U.S. start at US$21,955. The SE, XLE trims and the hybrid had no price change or a reduction of between $200 and $2000 with respect to the previous year. The Camry LE received a price increase of $710, while the new base level Camry L was introduced to the lineup.

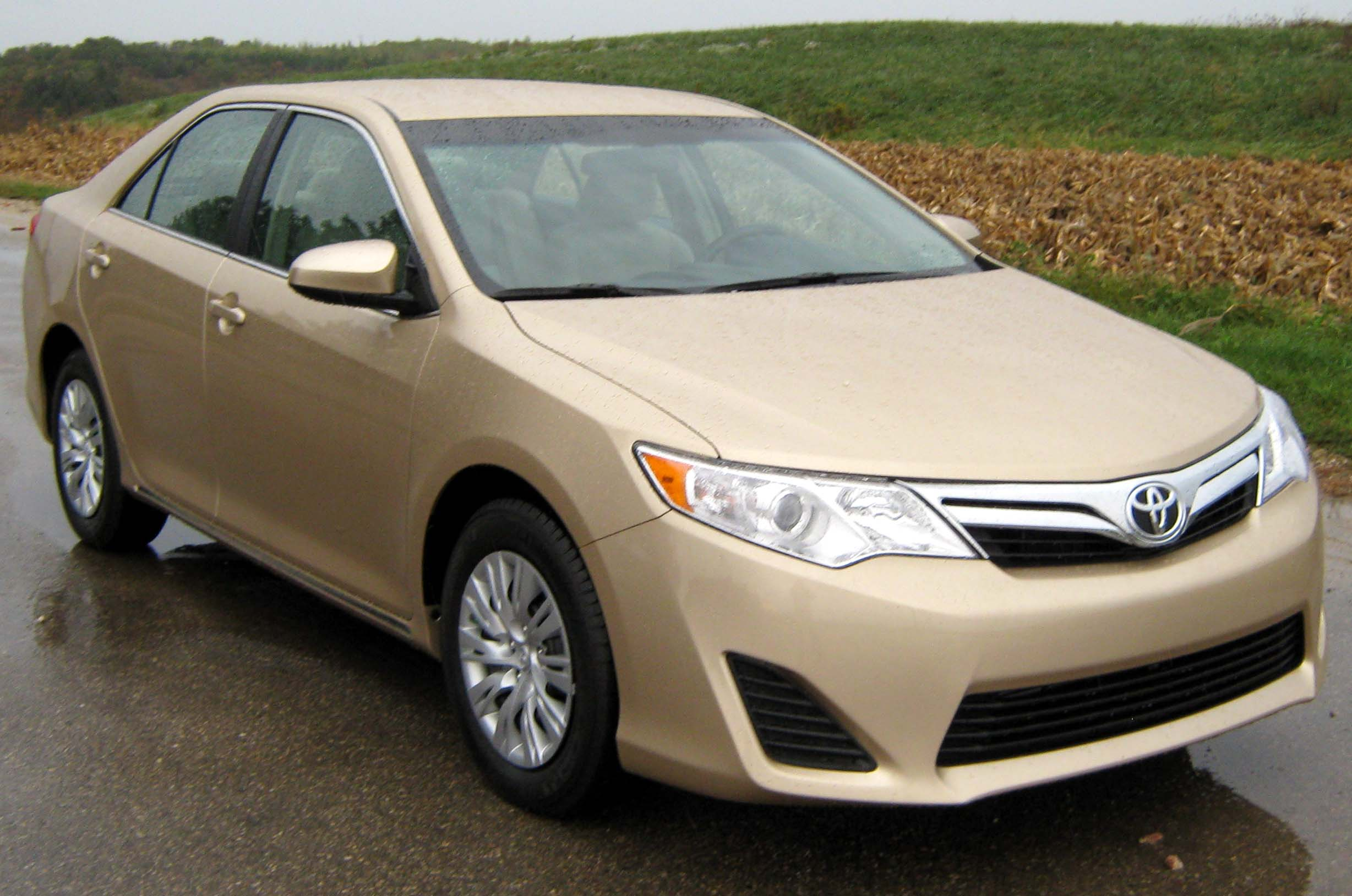
Camry LE (US)

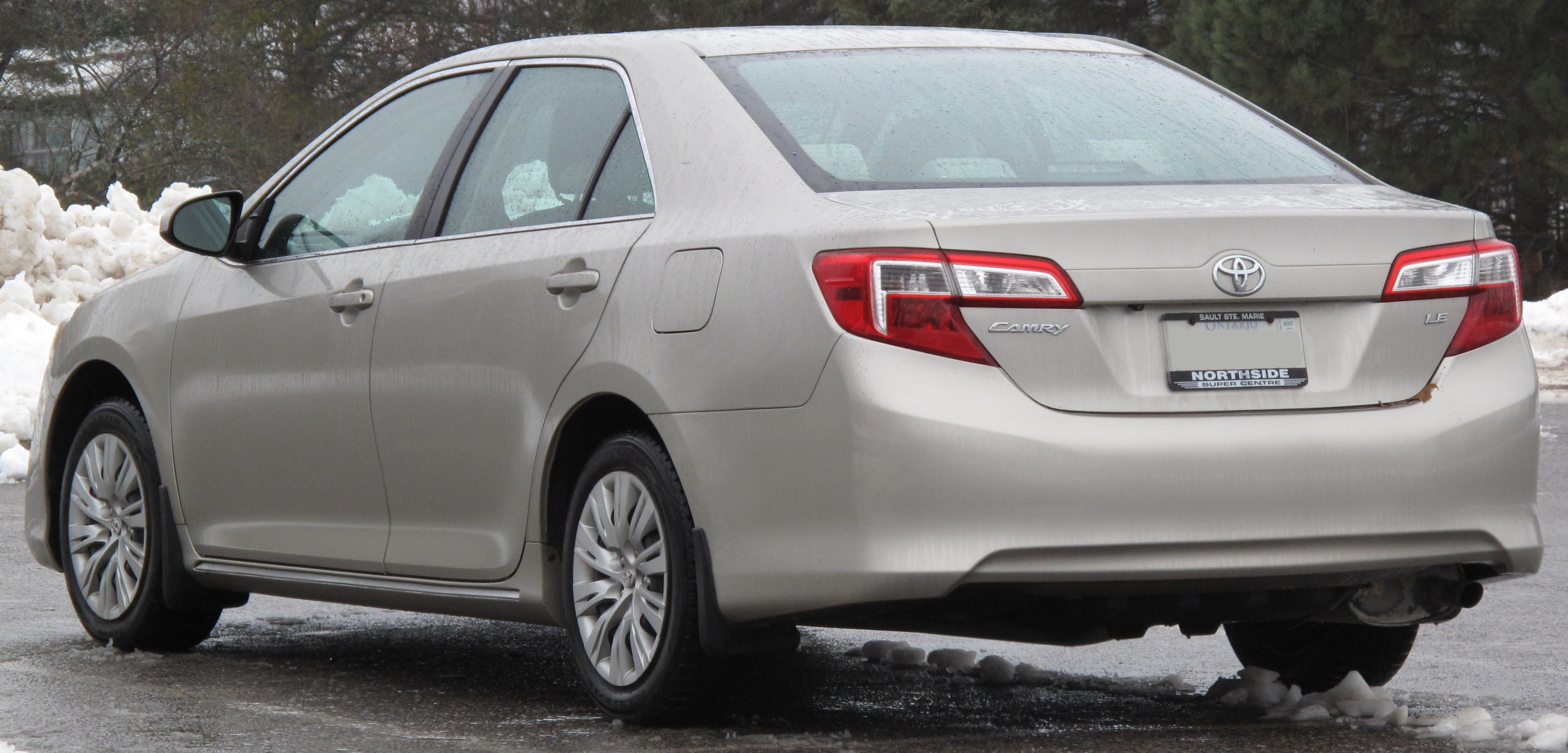
Camry LE (Canada)

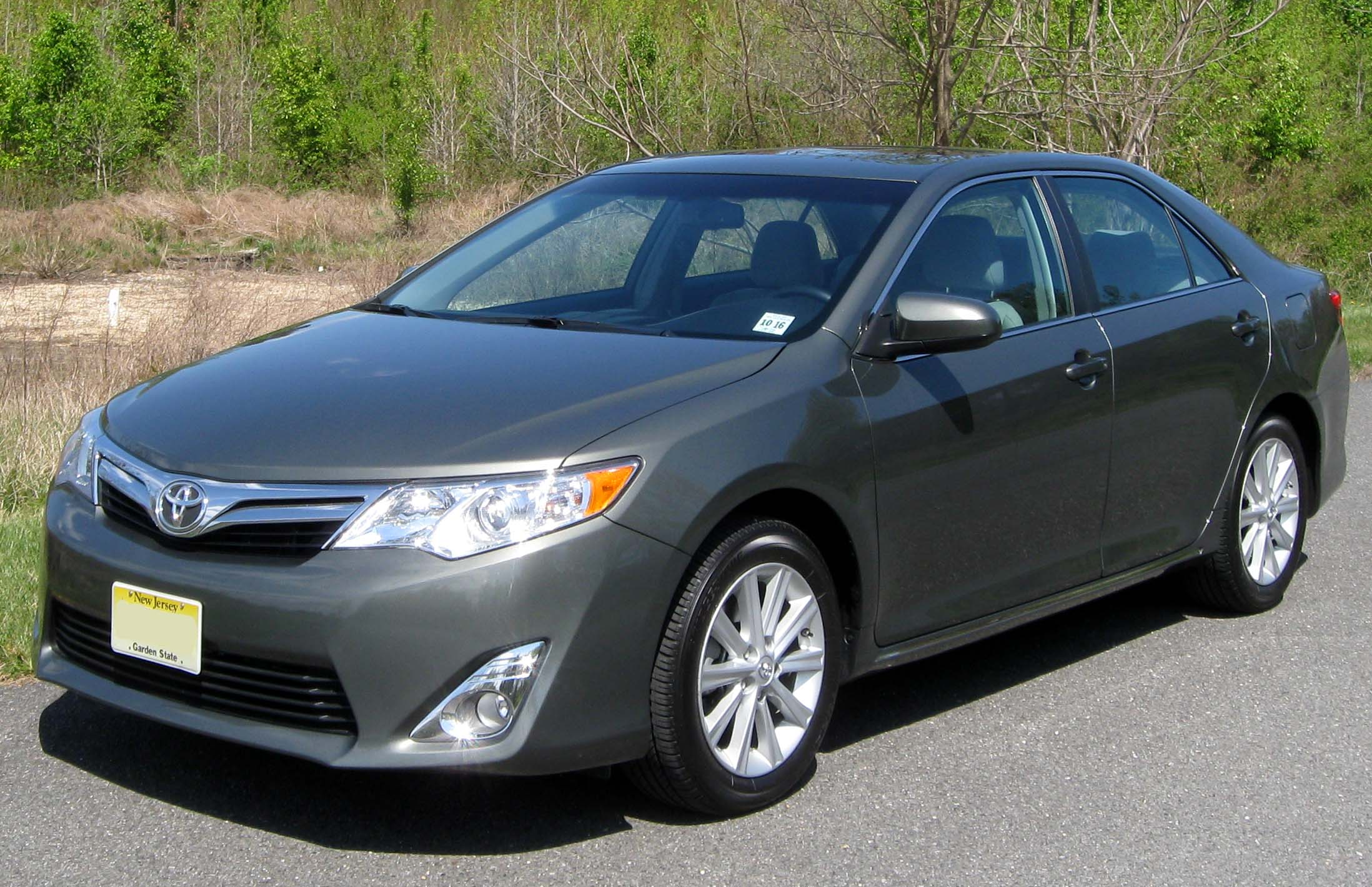
Camry XLE (US)

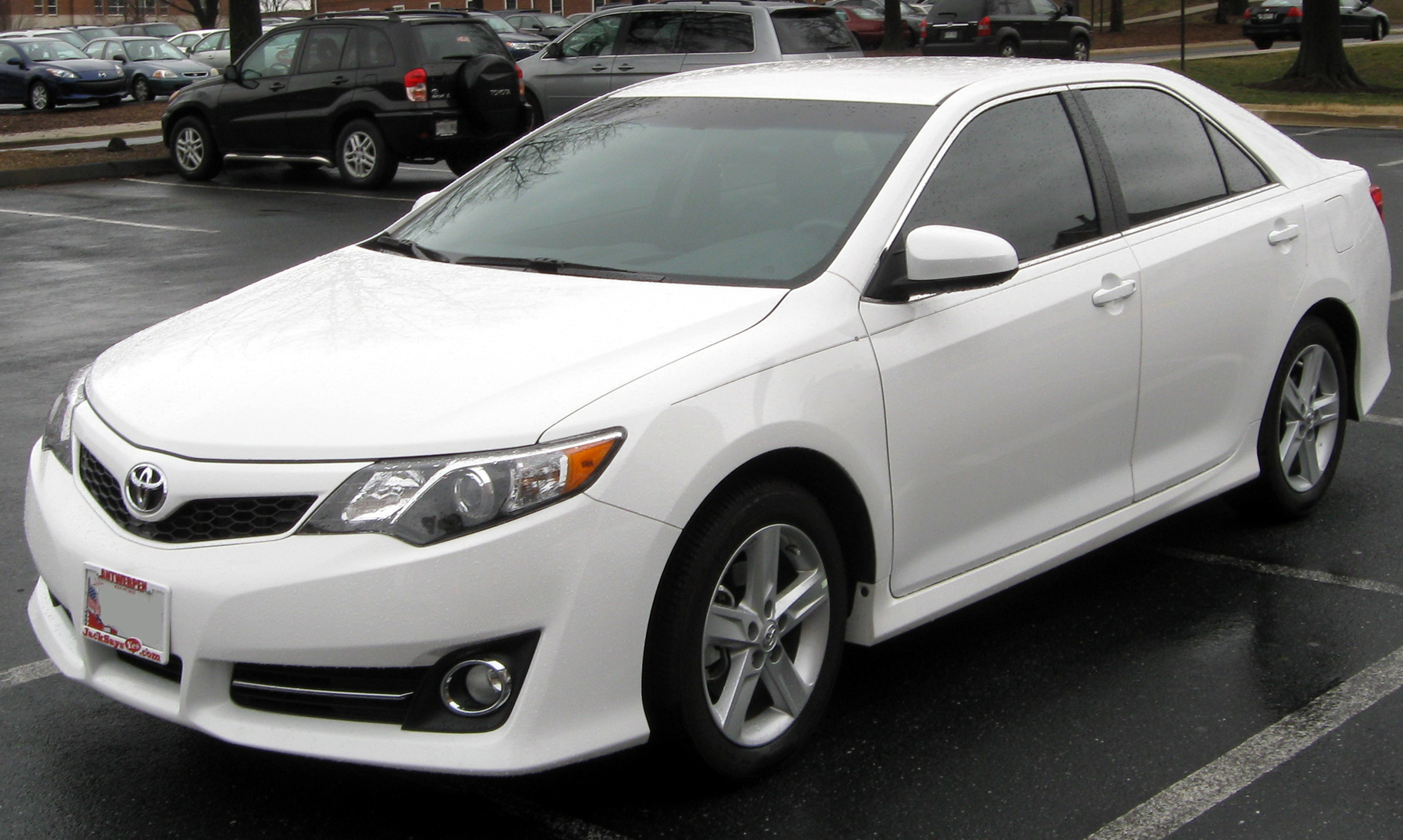
Camry SE (US)

=== Australasia ===
Introduced in late 2011, the XV50 series Camry in Australia and New Zealand was sold under a new two-tier naming and styling structure. For the petrol models (ASV50R), Altise remains the base model while Ateva, Sportivo and Grande have been replaced by the Atara S, SX and SL. Australian Camrys have different interior fabrics, colour and trim as well as the steering and suspension settings that were adapted for the local market. The Altise (base) starts at A$30,490 and the Atara SL (top-end) is A$39,990.

The XV50 series (AVV50R) Camry Hybrid was released to the Australian market in early 2012, and is available in two variants, the lower grade "h" (partially based on the Atara S) and the higher grade "hL" (based on the Atara SL). The hybrid models are differentiated to the petrol models by having a unique chrome grille and additional hybrid badging.

Toyota Australia also released limited-run models of the ASV50R, including the Atara R and RZ.

The facelift version of the XV50 started production in Australia on 28 April 2015. Australian production ended on 3 October 2017 when the Altona plant was closed, making it the last Toyota vehicle produced in Australia.

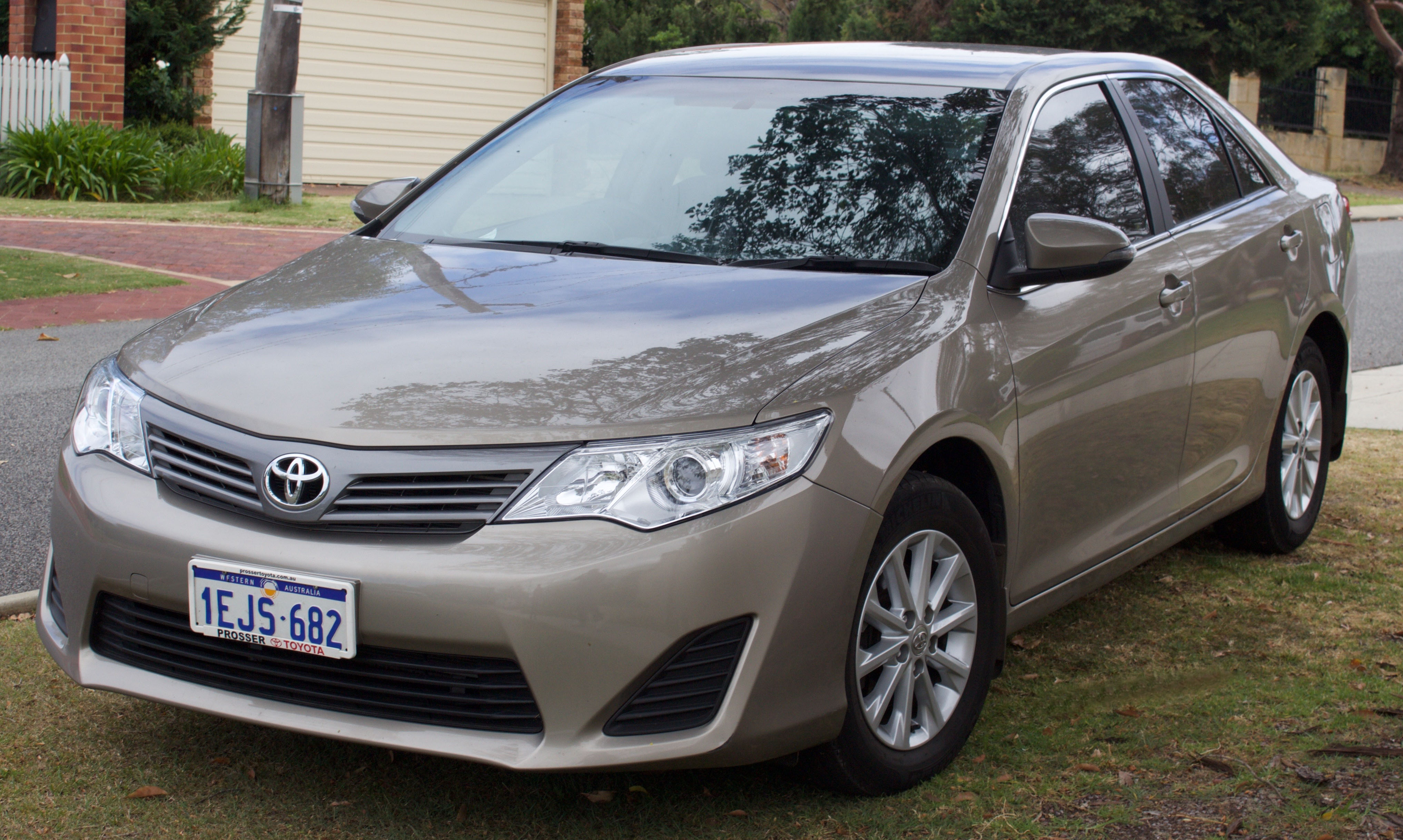
Camry Altise (Australia)

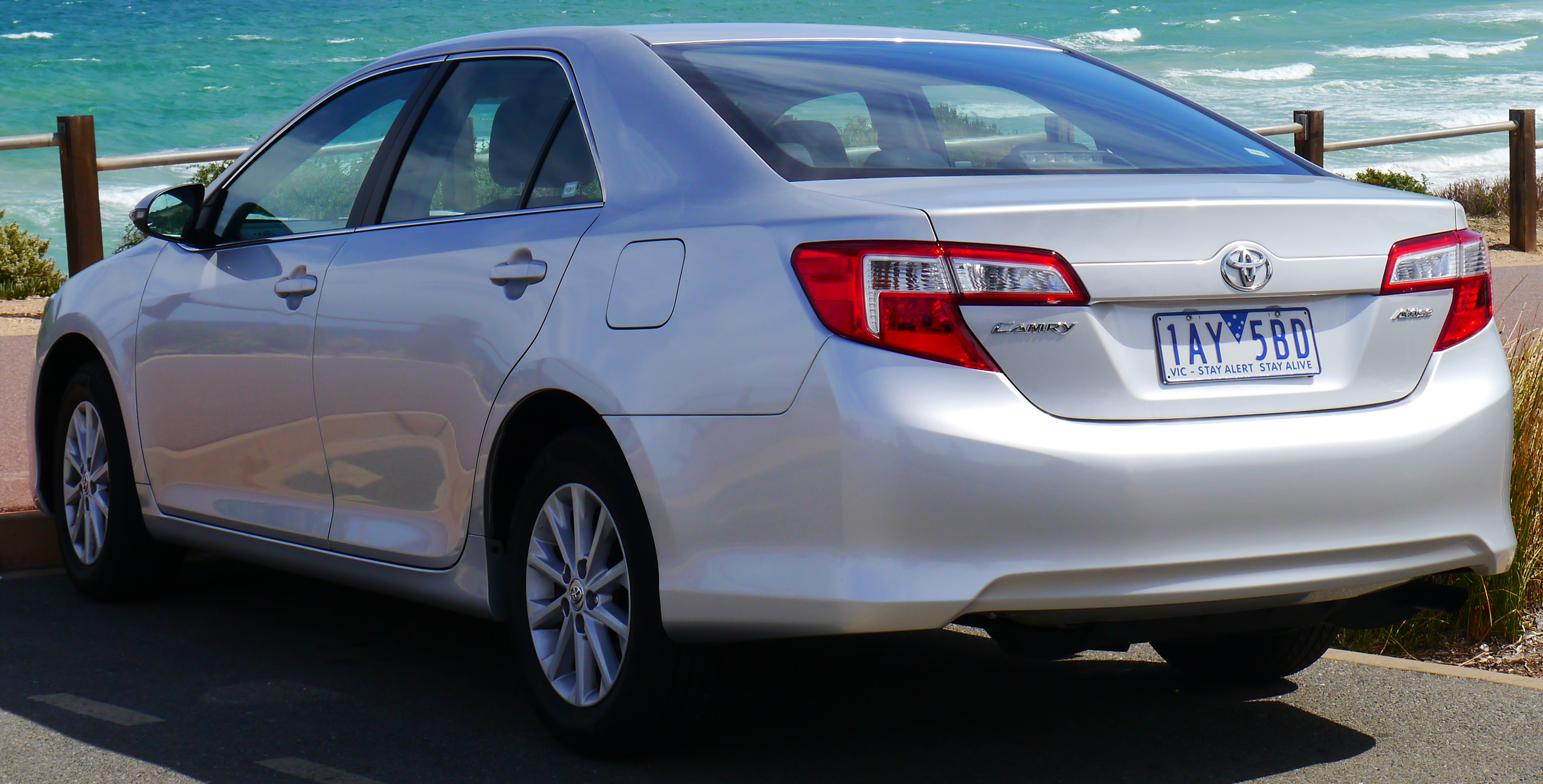
Camry Altise (Australia)

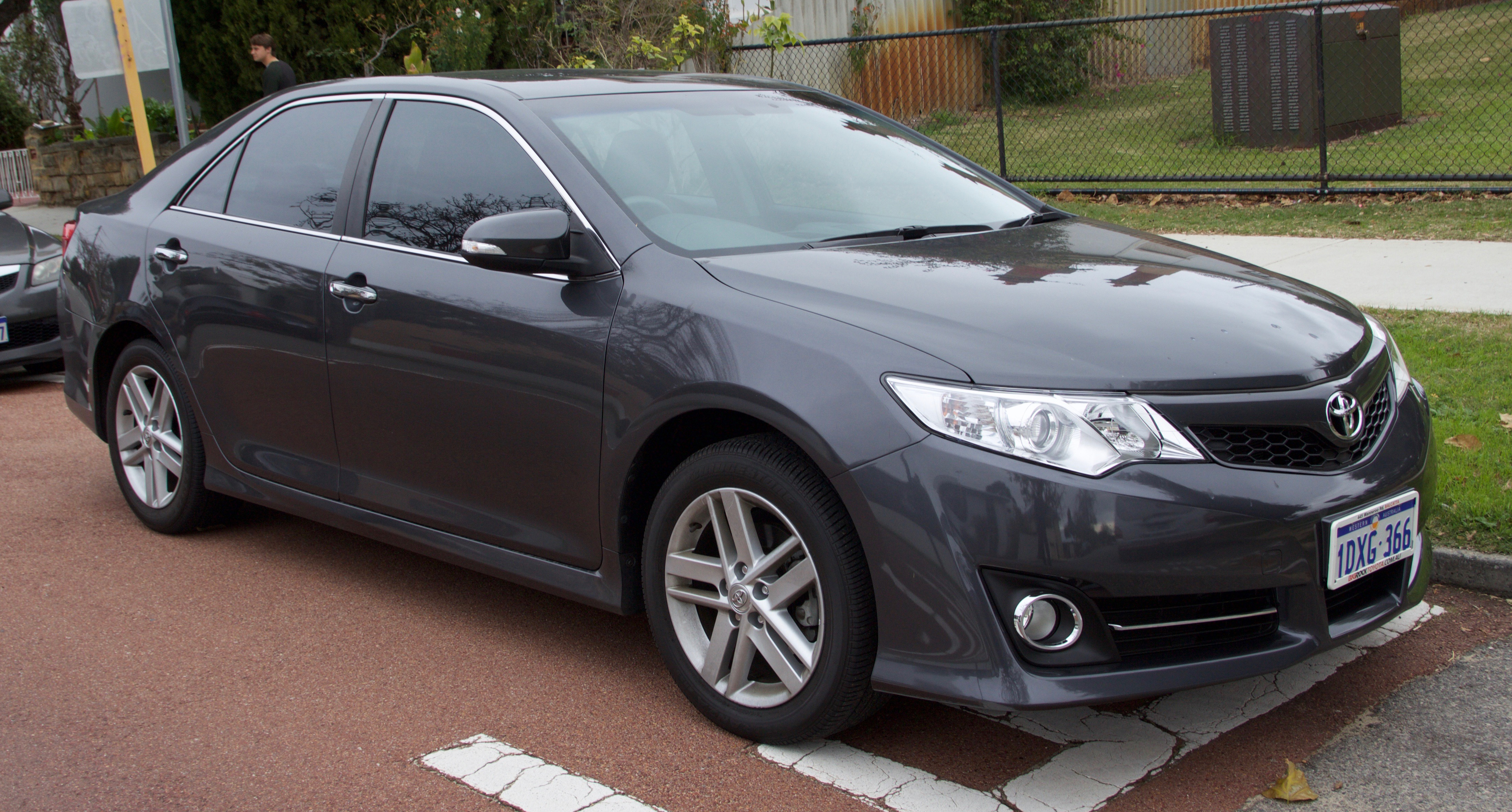
Atara S (Australia)

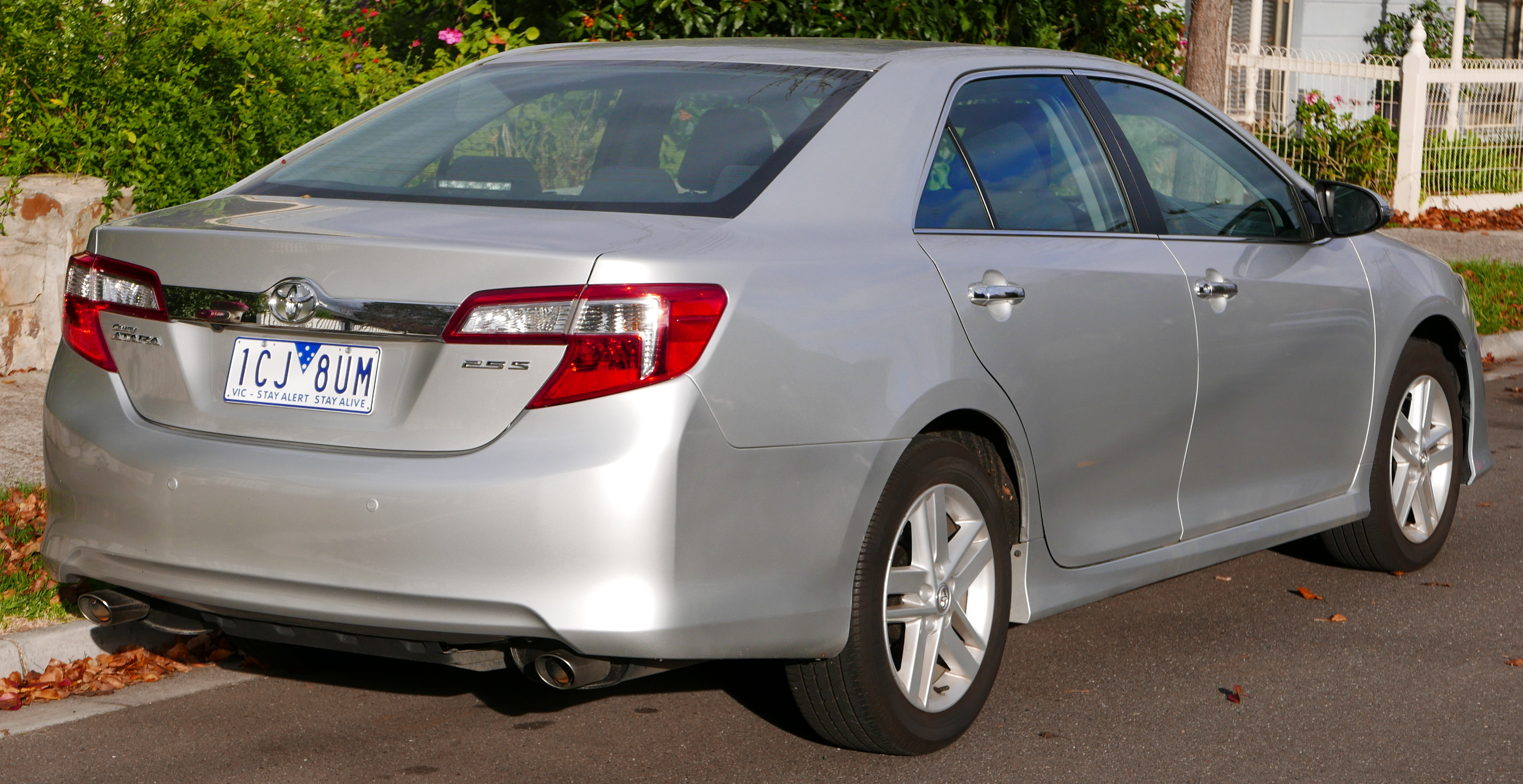
Atara S (Australia)

=== Asian version ===
The Asian version of the Camry was designed in Japan by Hirofumi Fukui, Kazumi Kowaki and Keisuke Matsuno in 2009. It is referred to as the "prestige Camry" by Toyota officials in Japan. The prestige Camry was first unveiled in Ukraine on 25 August 2011. It was also manufactured and sold in Australia as the Toyota Aurion (XV50), which was launched there in April 2012. The Camry was launched in China on 18 November 2011, followed by its hybrid counterpart on 21 May 2012.

The prestige Camry for the ASEAN market was first unveiled in Thailand at the 33rd Bangkok International Motor Show on 28 March 2012. In Indonesia, the prestige Camry was launched on 4 April 2012, followed by the Philippines on 27 April 2012, Malaysia on 1 June 2012 and Vietnam on 14 August 2012. This was the first time the Camry in Indonesia and Malaysia that also offered with a hybrid drivetrain. The prestige Camry, sold in Japan and other Asian markets, received a large facelift in 2014 (for the 2015 model year) and was unveiled during the Moscow International Automobile Salon. However, the Aurion in Australia did not receive the same treatment, but was given a much smaller facelift based on the original design.

In India, the prestige Camry was launched on 24 August 2012. The Camry Hybrid was also available for the first time in India, which was launched on 28 August 2013. Both the Indian market Camry and Camry Hybrid were locally assembled.

In Taiwan, the prestige Camry was launched on 2 December 2011. The Camry Hybrid was also available for the first time in Taiwan. Both the Taiwan market Camry and Camry Hybrid were locally assembled. In March 2015, Toyota facelifted the Camry with new bumpers, grille, air dams, rear combination lamps, and most importantly the new 2.0-litre 6AR-FSE engine with Dual VVT-i. The 2.0 E came with a 6-speed automatic transmission. In June 2017, the facelift model was launched, with Eco, Standard and Elegance trims. Safety features such as seven airbags, ABS with EBD and brake assist, Vehicle Stability Control (VSC) were standard across all trims.

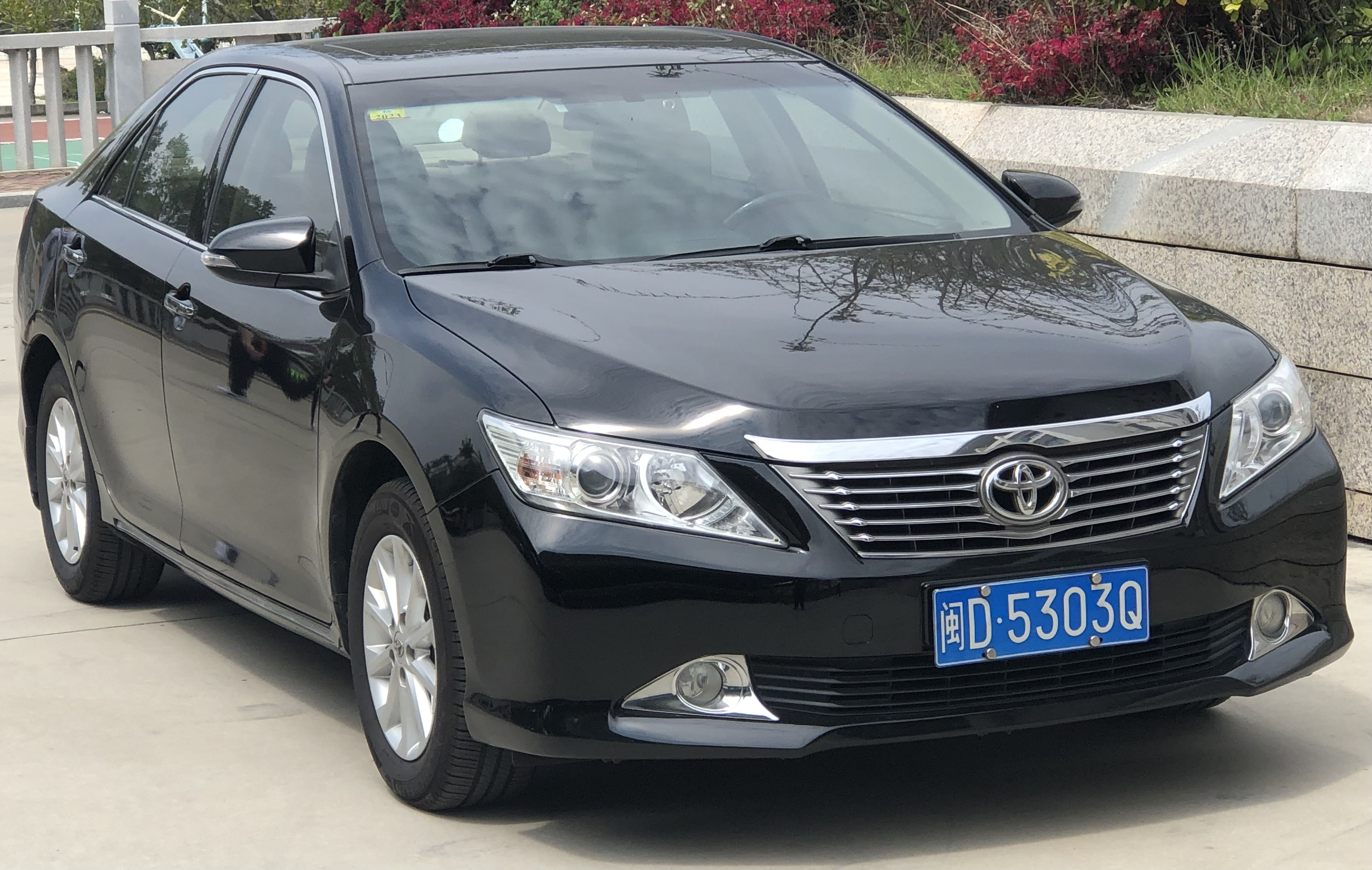
GAC-Toyota Camry 2.5G (China)

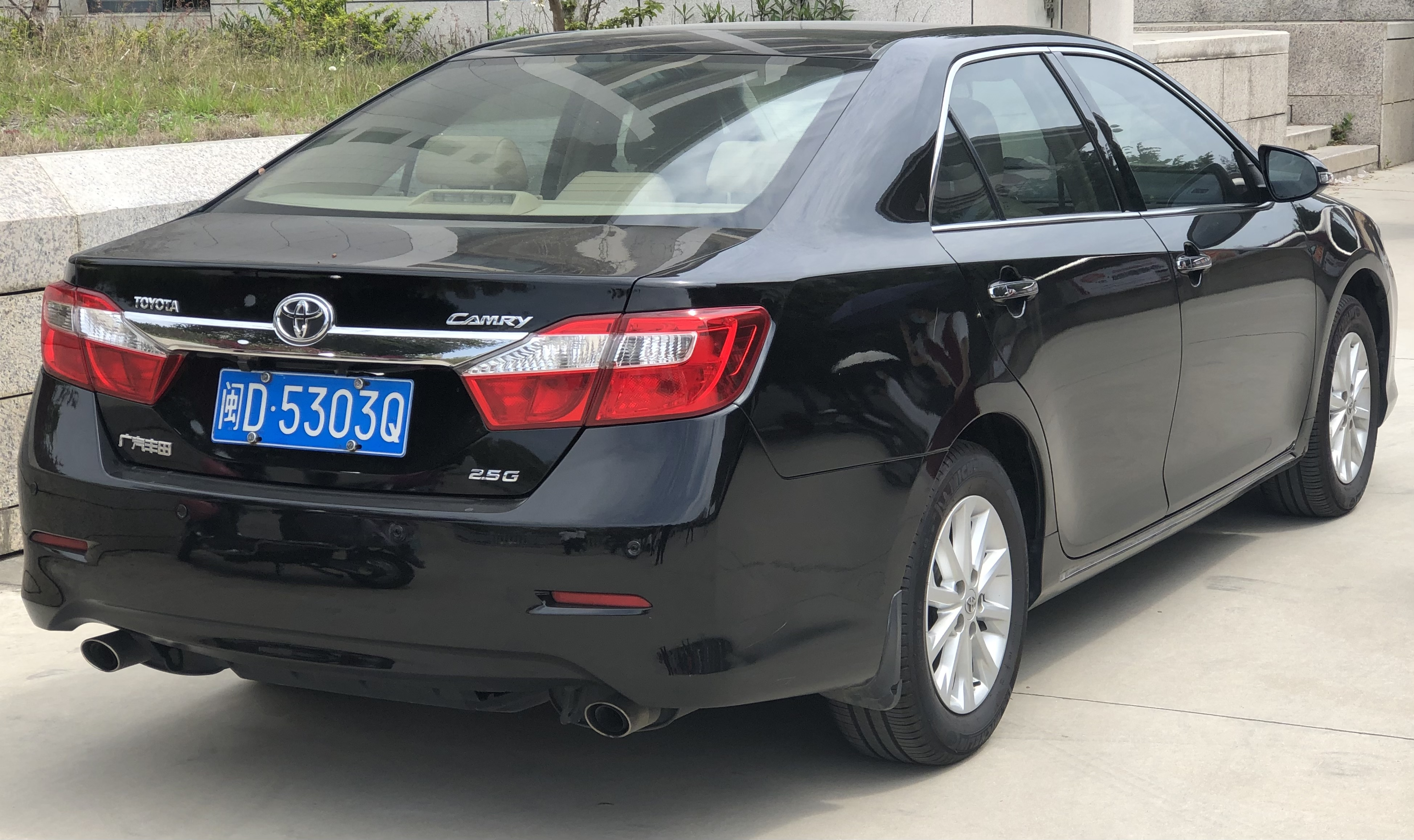
GAC-Toyota Camry 2.5G (China)

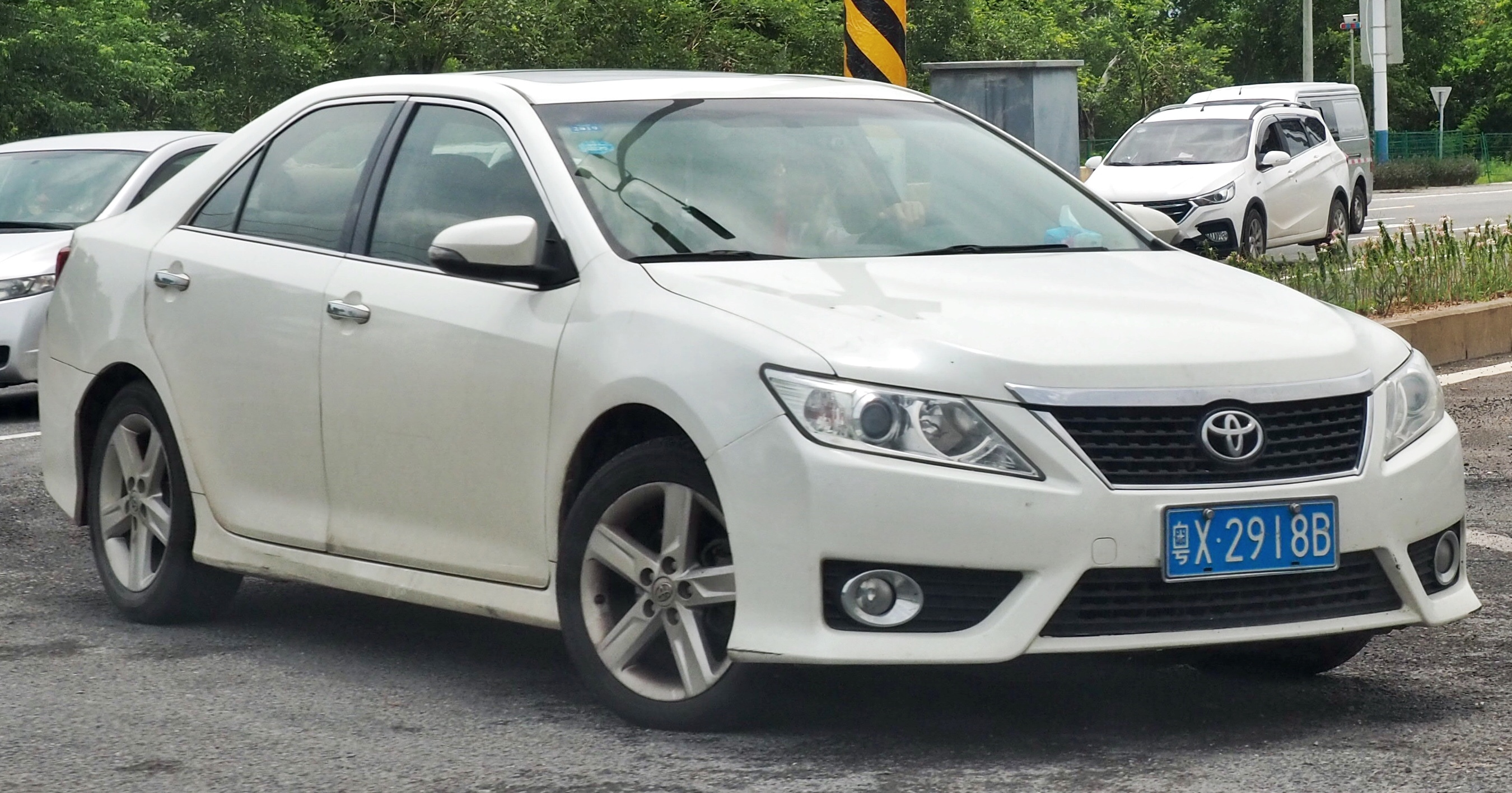
GAC-Toyota Camry 2.5S (China)

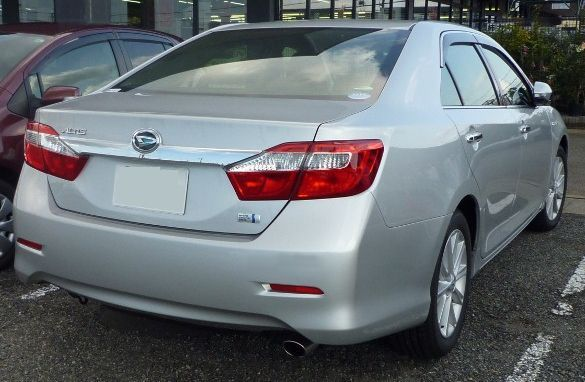
Daihatsu Altis (Japan)

== 2014 facelift ==
Toyota introduced a substantial mid-cycle restyling to the XV50 Camry at the 2014 New York International Auto Show in April 2014. The changes, applicable to the entire Camry range and dubbed the "big minor change" (not a new generation), consisted mainly of the alteration of most of the exterior panels – only the roof remained unchanged. The powertrain remained unchanged from the pre-facelift model.

The facelift included an aggressive front bumper featuring a wider and more prominent trapezoidal grille shape. The interior received a more premium appearance, with improved materials and amenities. The window and door seals were improved to reduce wind and road noise. This version was sold in North America, the Middle East and Australasia.

The facelifted "prestige" Camry was first launched in Japan on 9 September 2014 in Hybrid powertrain. Unlike the facelifted regular Camry, the exterior panels of the facelifted "prestige" Camry remained unchanged, except the new headlamps (which has a similar shape to the pre-facelift regular Camry), new tail lamps, new front grille (similar to the XX40 Avalon), and new front and rear bumpers. This version was also sold in China, Taiwan, Southeast Asia, Eastern Europe, South America and Jordan.

Toyota started production of restyled Camry for Russian market in November 2014. The car has a new design and a new 2.0 L 6AR-FSE engine, 150 bhp (112 kW), paired with a 6-speed automatic gearbox.

In China, the facelifted Camry was launched in January 2015. Available engines are the 2.0 L 6AR-FSE and the 5AR-FE which is China's variant of the 2AR-FE four-cylinder. Trim levels are named as the 2.0 E, 2.0 G, 2.0 S, 2.5G, 2.5S, and the top model 2.5Q. Pricing starts from 184,800 yuan to 289,800 yuan ($27,840 to US$43,660). Hybrid trims were known as the 2.5 HG and 2.5 HQ. The standard engine was the 2.5 litre 2AR-FXE hybrid engine which is known as the 4AR-FXE in China.

In Thailand, the facelifted Camry was launched on 11 March 2015 with available trim levels as 2.5HV Premium, 2.5HV NAVI, 2.5HV CD, 2.5G, 2.0G Extremo, and 2.0G. The old 1AZ-FE engine was discontinued and replaced with the 6AR-FBS engine. Toyota Thailand also later introduced the additional trim level "ESport" which was imported from Australia on 12 June 2015. Marking the first time for the country to have both regular and prestige Camry models selling at the same time.

In Indonesia, the facelifted Camry was launched on 1 April 2015. Trim levels remain unchanged as the 2.5 G, 2.5 V, and 2.5 Hybrid.

Toyota Australia commenced production of the facelift XV50 Camry for the Australian market in April 2015.

In the Gulf States, the facelifted Camry was launched in June 2015 for the 2016 model year. Trim levels in most GCC markets include the GL, GLX and all-new XSE which replaces the SE. Unlike the GL and GLX, which continued to be imported from Australia, the XSE is imported from the United States. In the UAE specifically, trims levels available there are S, SE, SE+ and Limited.

In February 2015, for the 2016 model year, Toyota released the Special Edition Camry for the US market—limited to 12,000 units. Based on the SE model, it has unique black gloss and silver painted 18-inch alloy wheels, blue accents and stitching throughout the interior including the seats, white-faced gauges with aluminum trim, smoked taillights, Special Edition floor mats and trunk emblem. Added standard equipment include a power moonroof, keyless entry and ignition, and a Qi inductive charge pad for mobile phones. The only option was a navigation system. Available colours unique to the Special Edition Camry were either Blizzard Pearl (white) or Blue Streak Metallic. These two colours joined the regular colour palette for the 2017 model year, although only available on SE and XSE models.

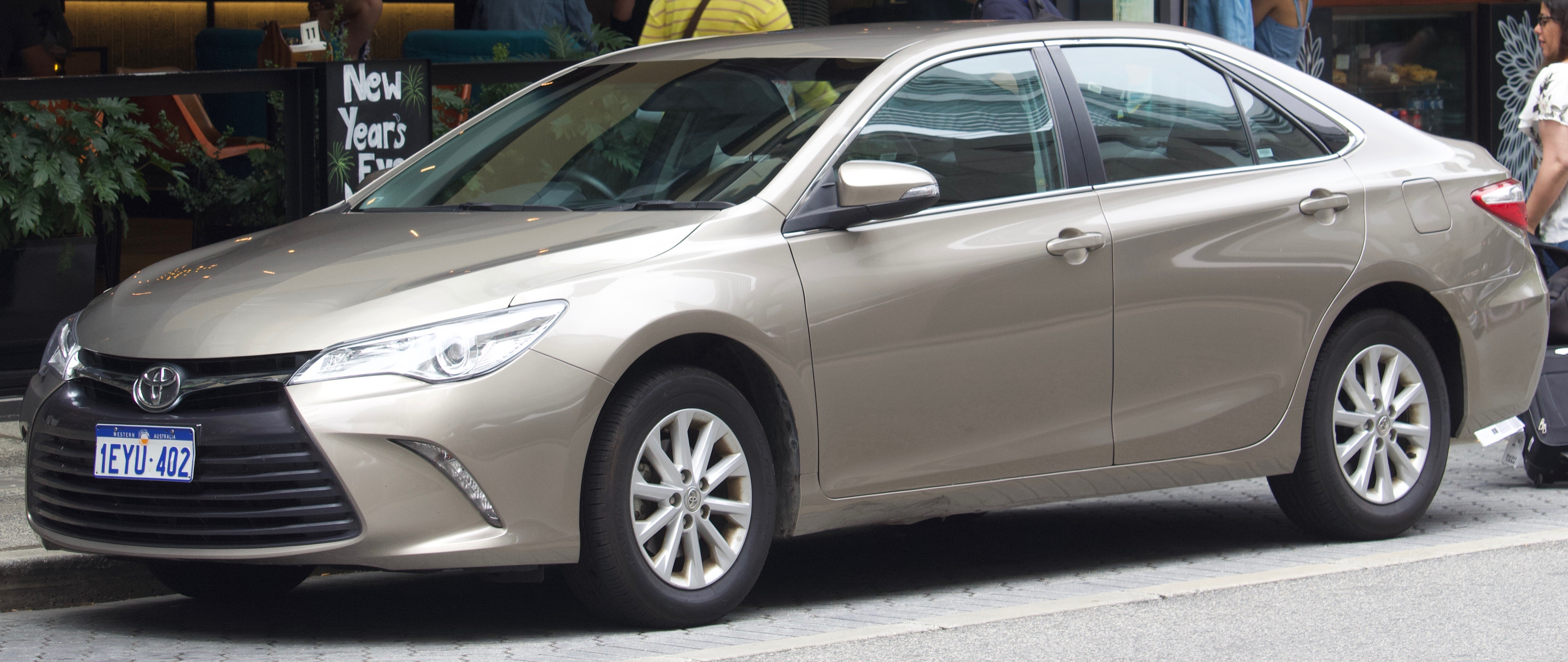
Facelift (front; Australasia)

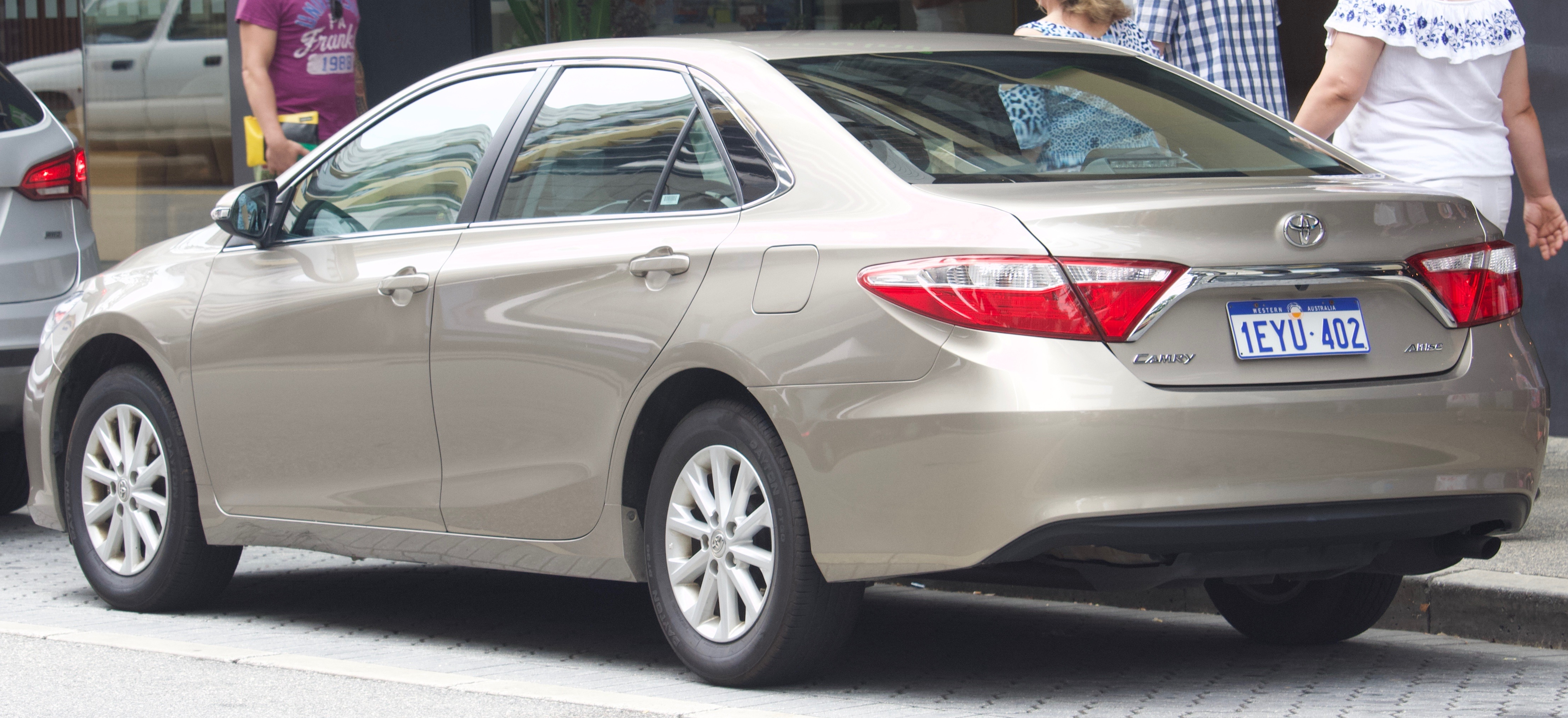
Facelift (rear; Australasia)

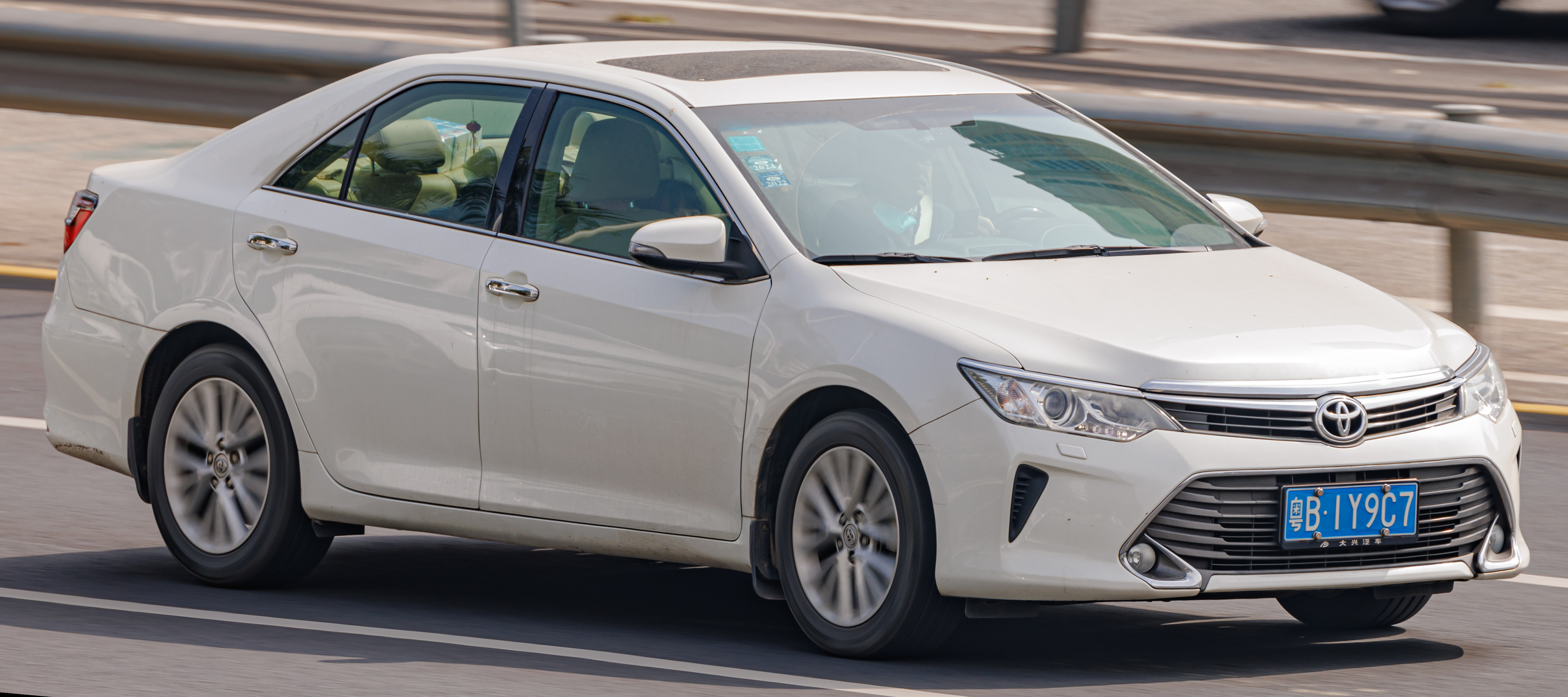
Facelift (front; China)

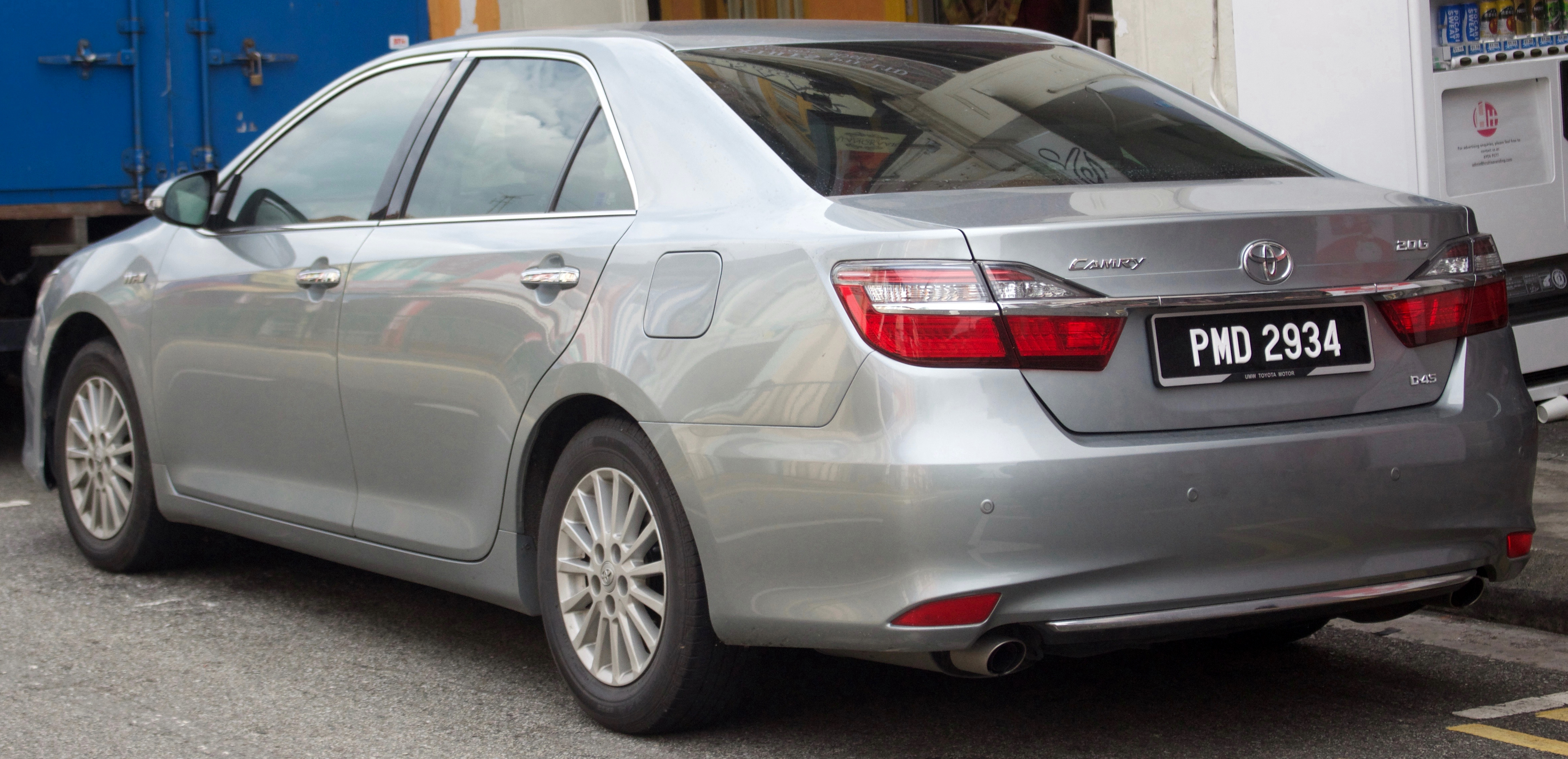
Facelift (rear; Malaysia)

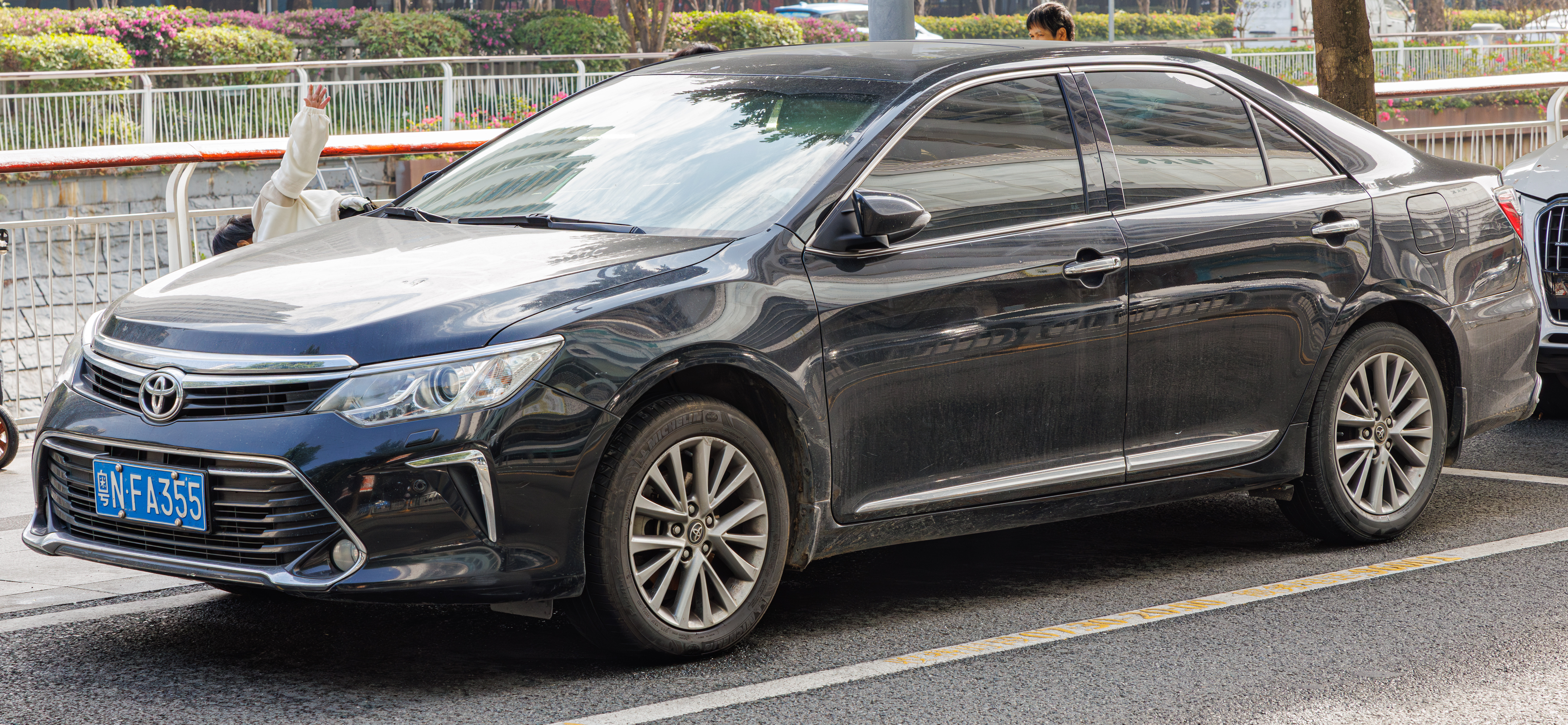
Facelift (front; China)

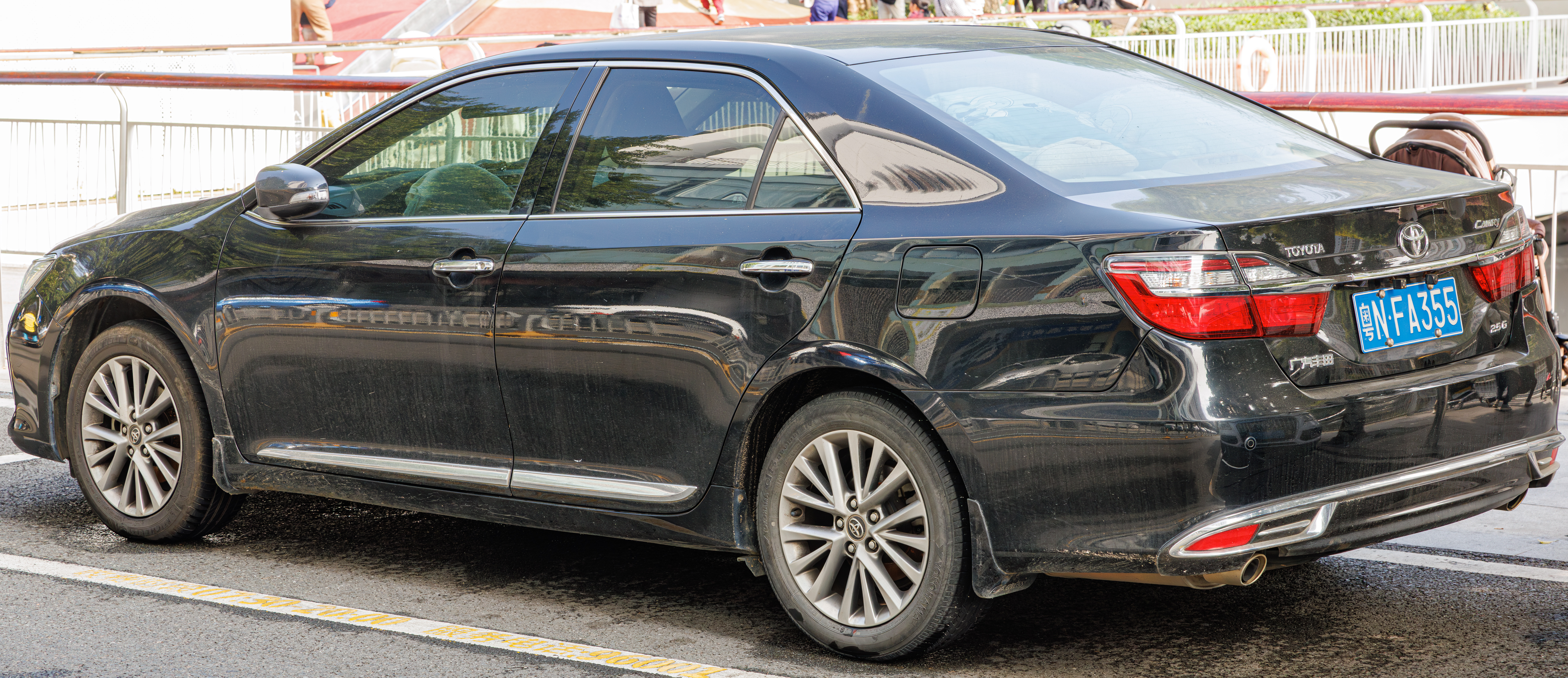
Facelift (rear; China)

== Camry Hybrid ==
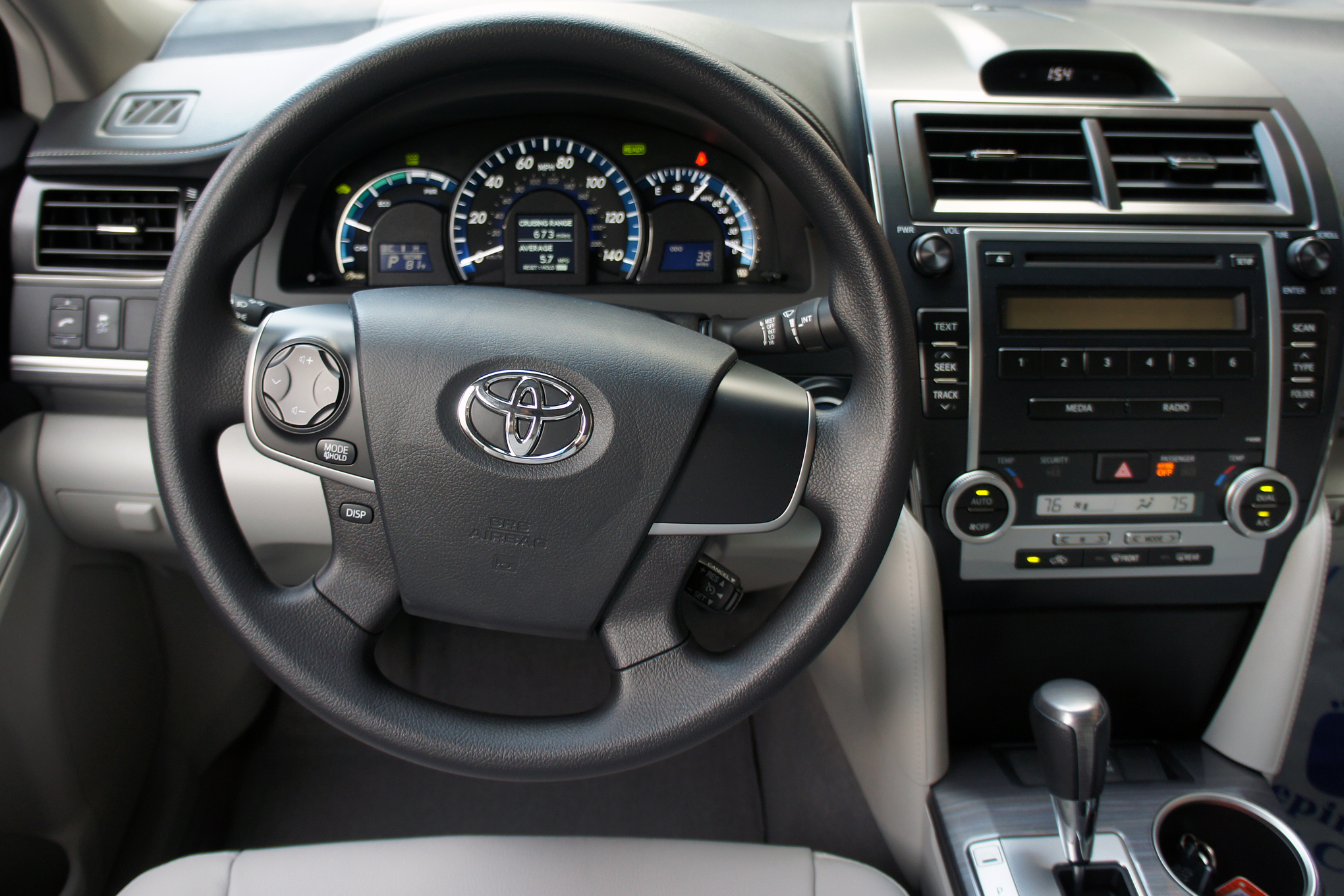
Camry Hybrid interior (US)

The Camry Hybrid received improvements, including a revised version of the Hybrid Synergy Drive, paired with an Atkinson cycle version of the standard 2AR-FE 2.5-litre 4-cylinder, the 2AR-FXE. The engine delivers net system power of 149 kW (200 bhp), up from 139 kW (187 bhp) in the previous model, and allows the new model to achieve a 39% increase in fuel economy rating, giving the Camry Hybrid best MPG ratings among mid-size sedans. The Camry Hybrid uses a 1.6 kWh sealed nickel-metal hydride traction battery.

It has a drag coefficient of Cd=0.27, which in Australia makes it the most aerodynamic locally produced car, the same as its XV40 predecessor.

EPA fuel economy ratings
Grade	City	Highway	Combined
LE	5.5 L/100 km (43 mpg_{‑US})	6.0 L/100 km (39 mpg_{‑US})	5.7 L/100 km (41 mpg_{‑US})
XLE	5.9 L/100 km (40 mpg_{‑US})	6.2 L/100 km (38 mpg_{‑US})	5.9 L/100 km (40 mpg_{‑US})

Regular

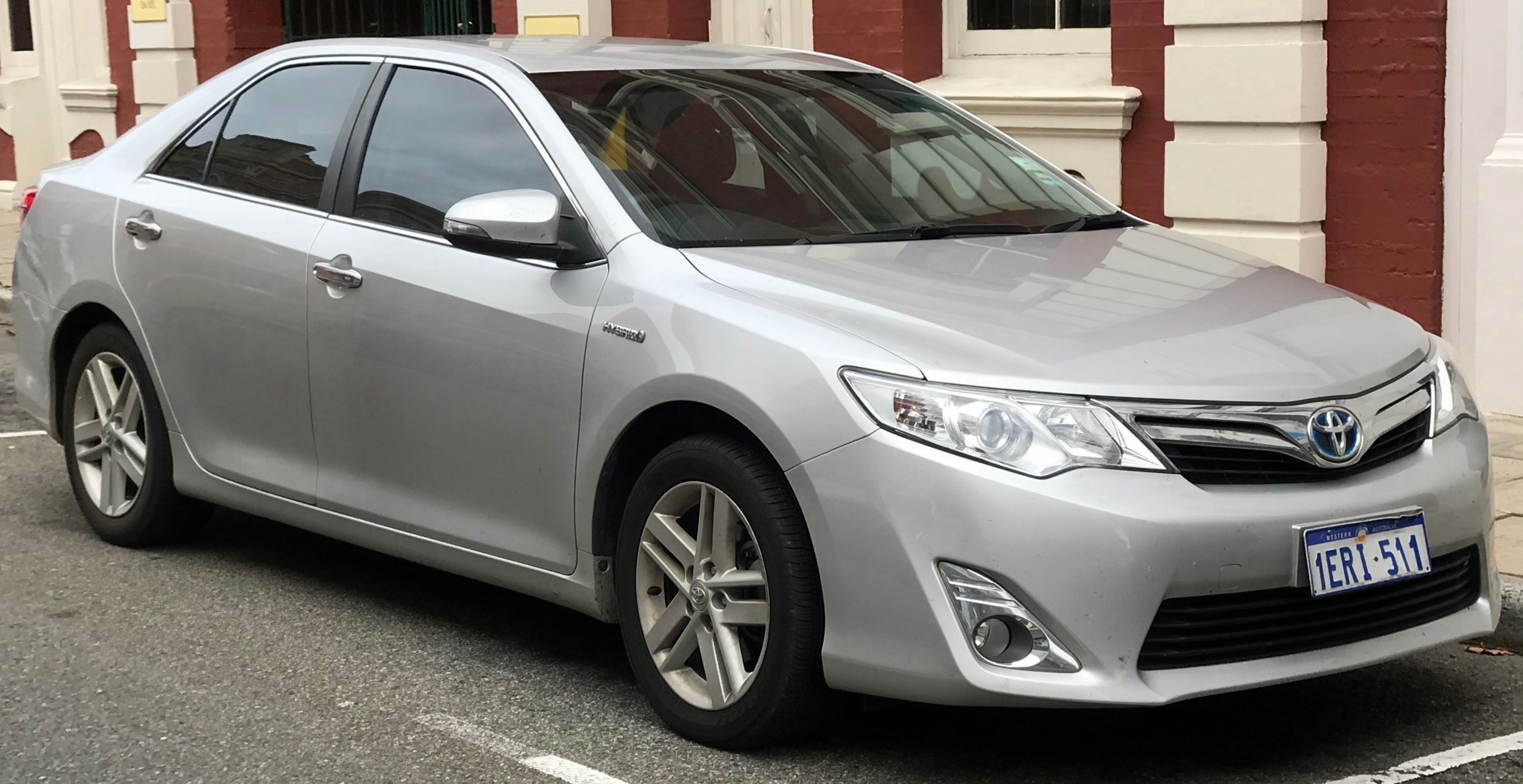
Camry Hybrid (Australia; pre-facelift)

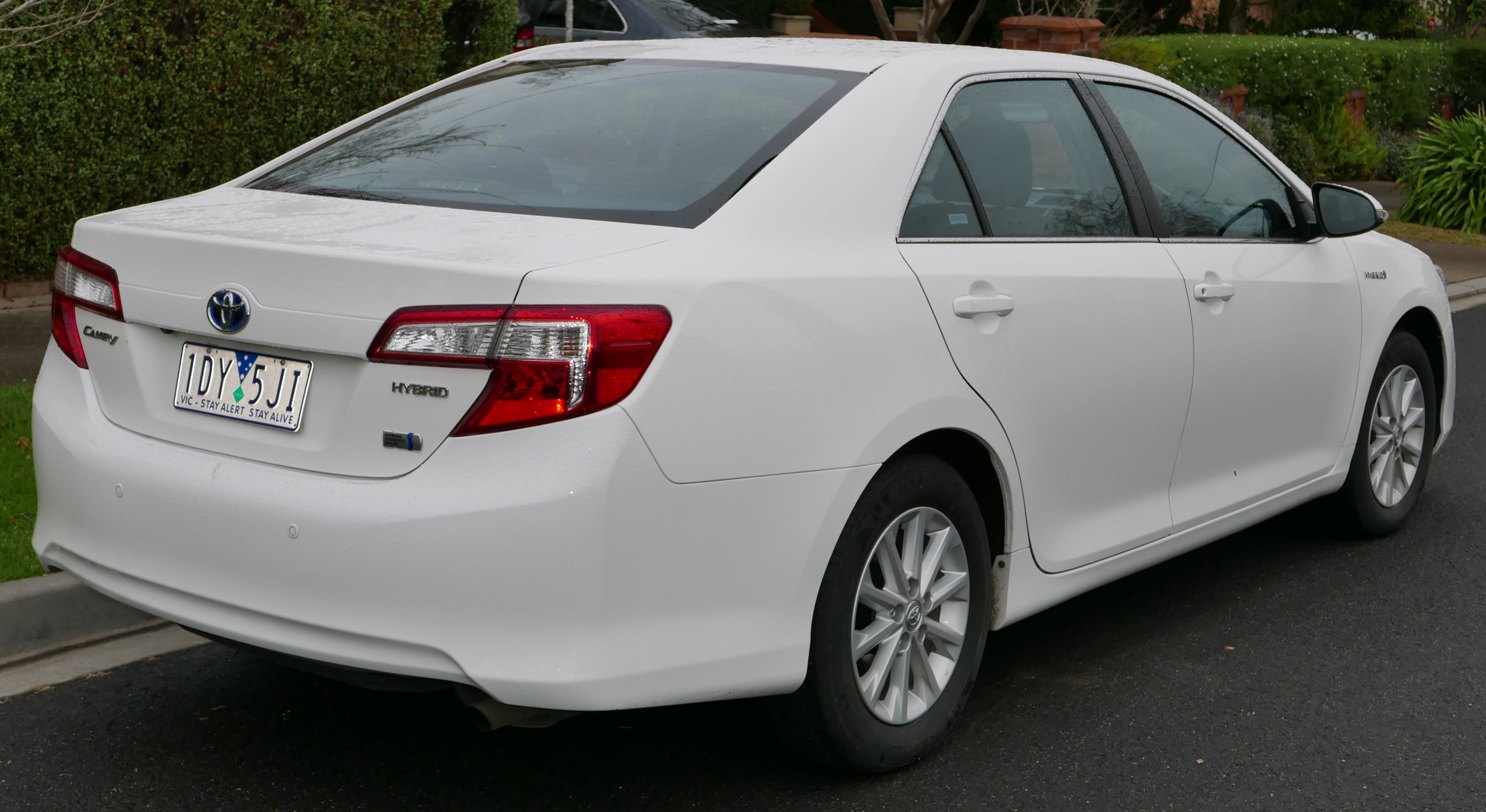
Camry Hybrid (Australia; pre-facelift)

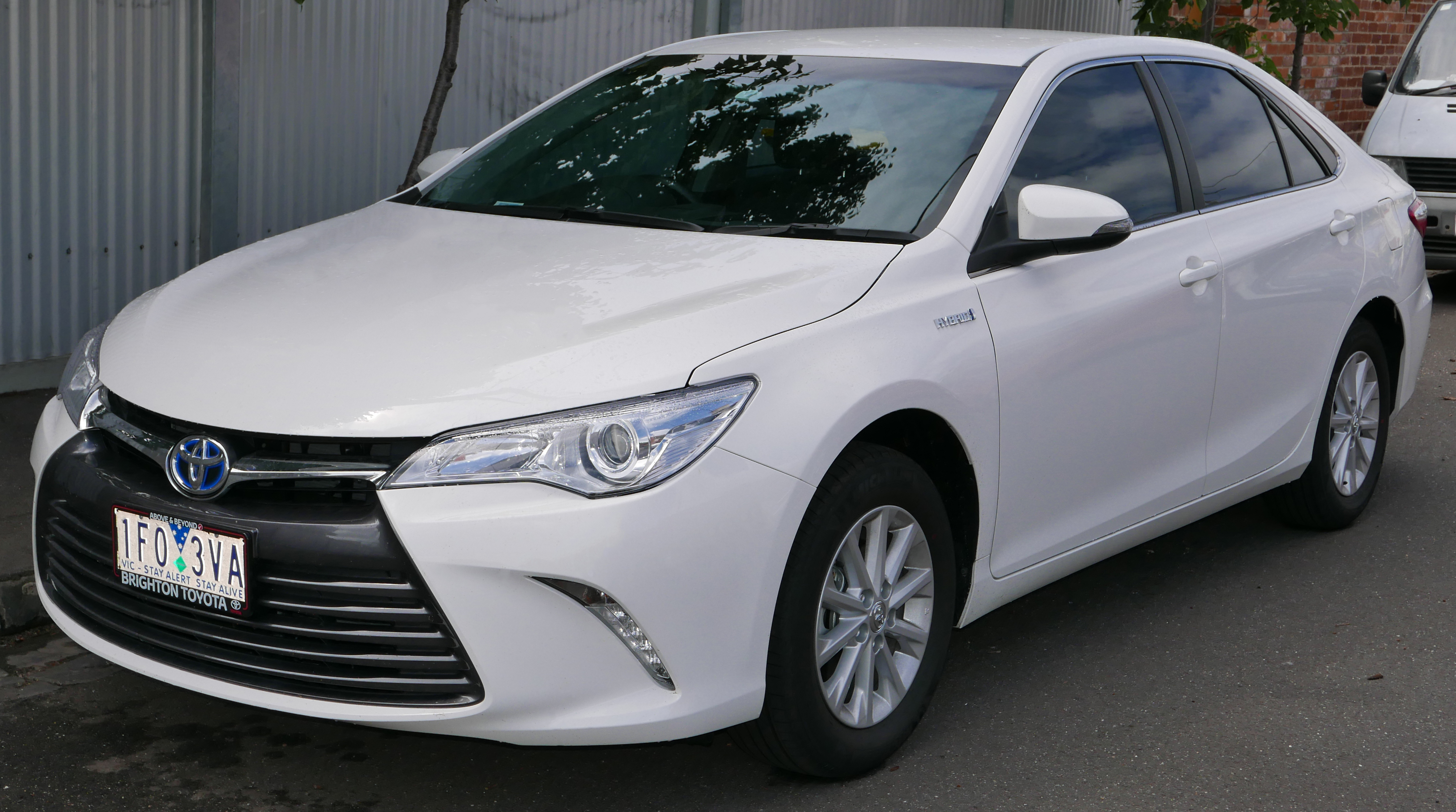
Camry Hybrid Altise (Australia; facelift)

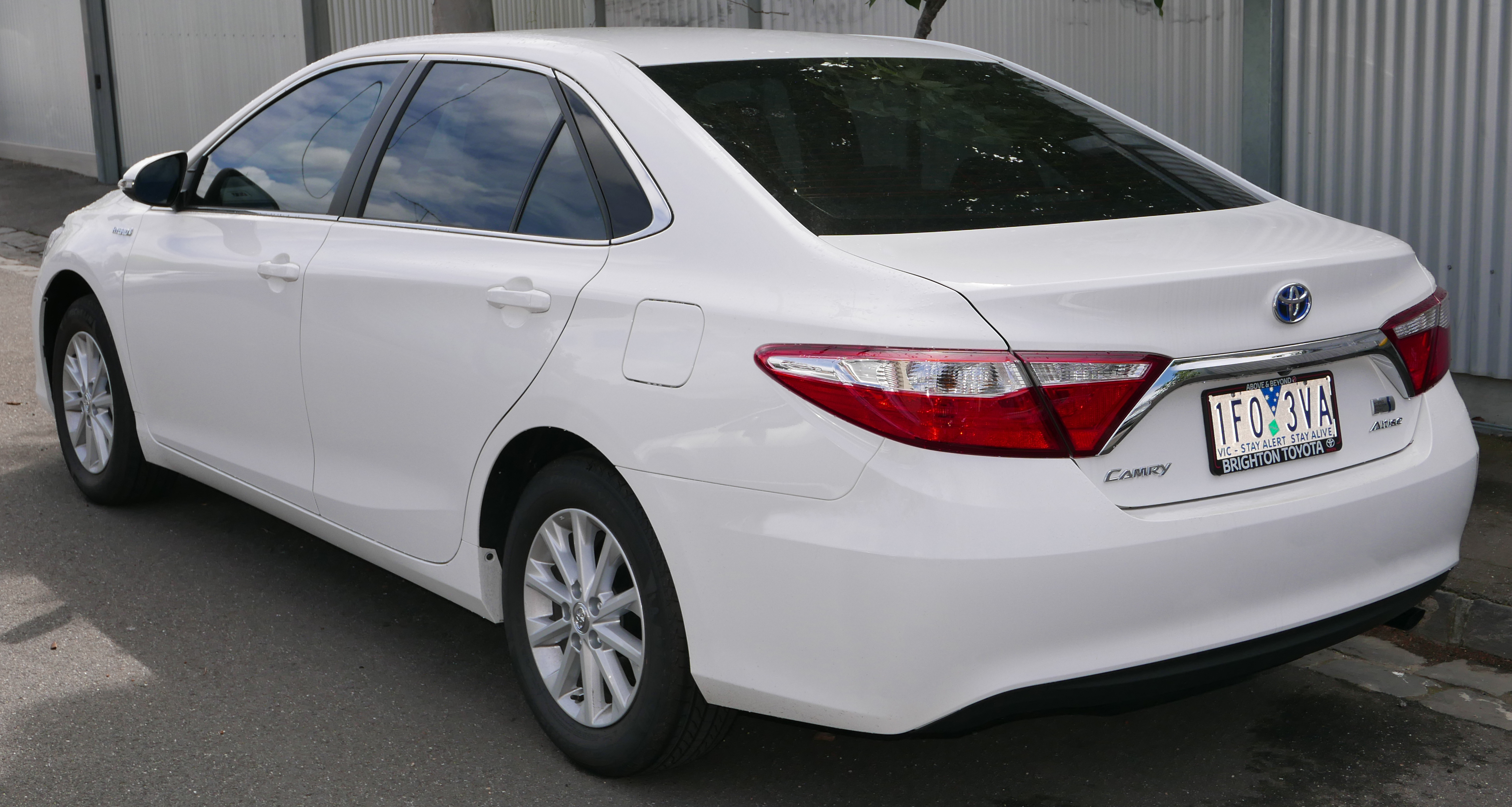
Camry Hybrid Altise (Australia; facelift)

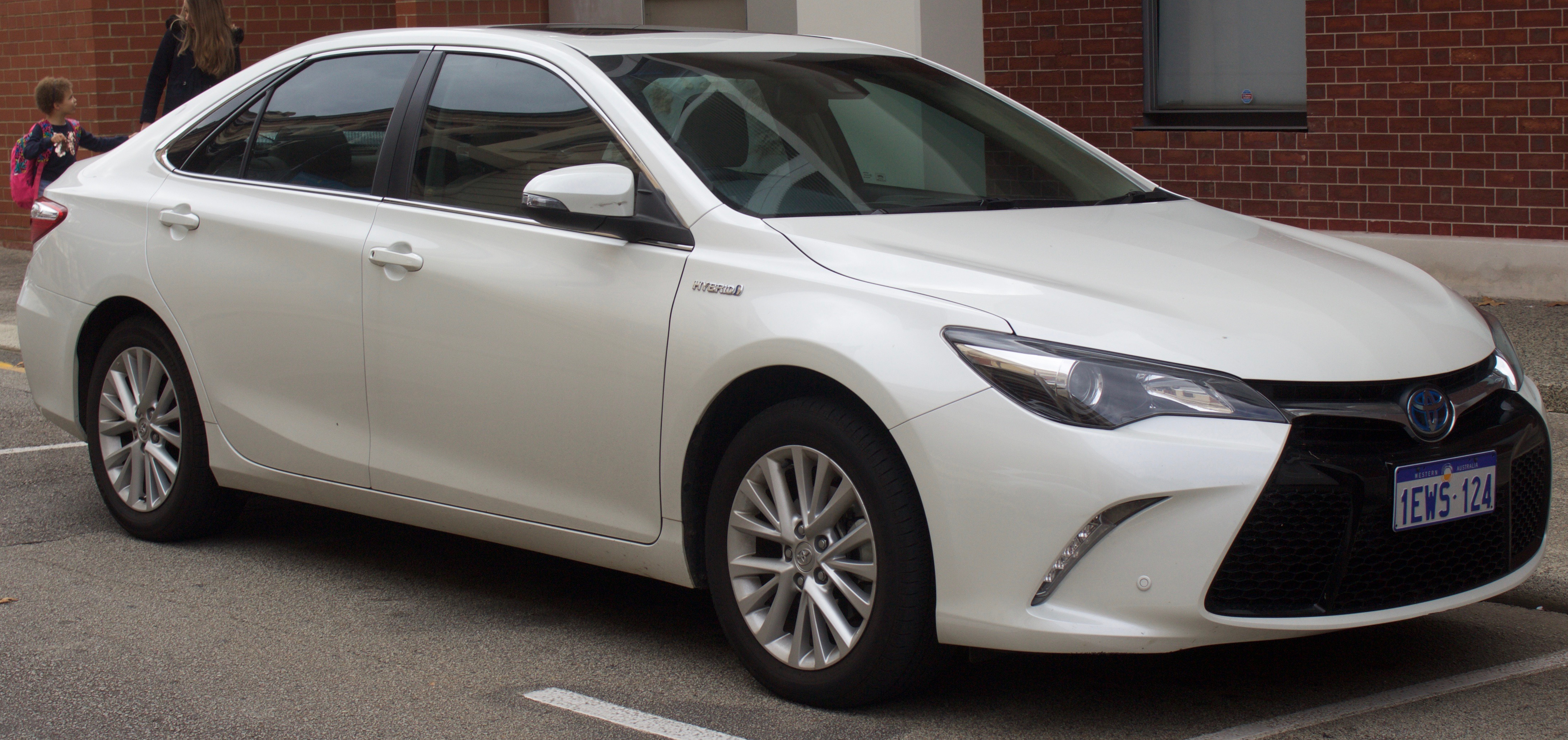
Camry Hybrid Atara (Australia; facelift)

Prestige

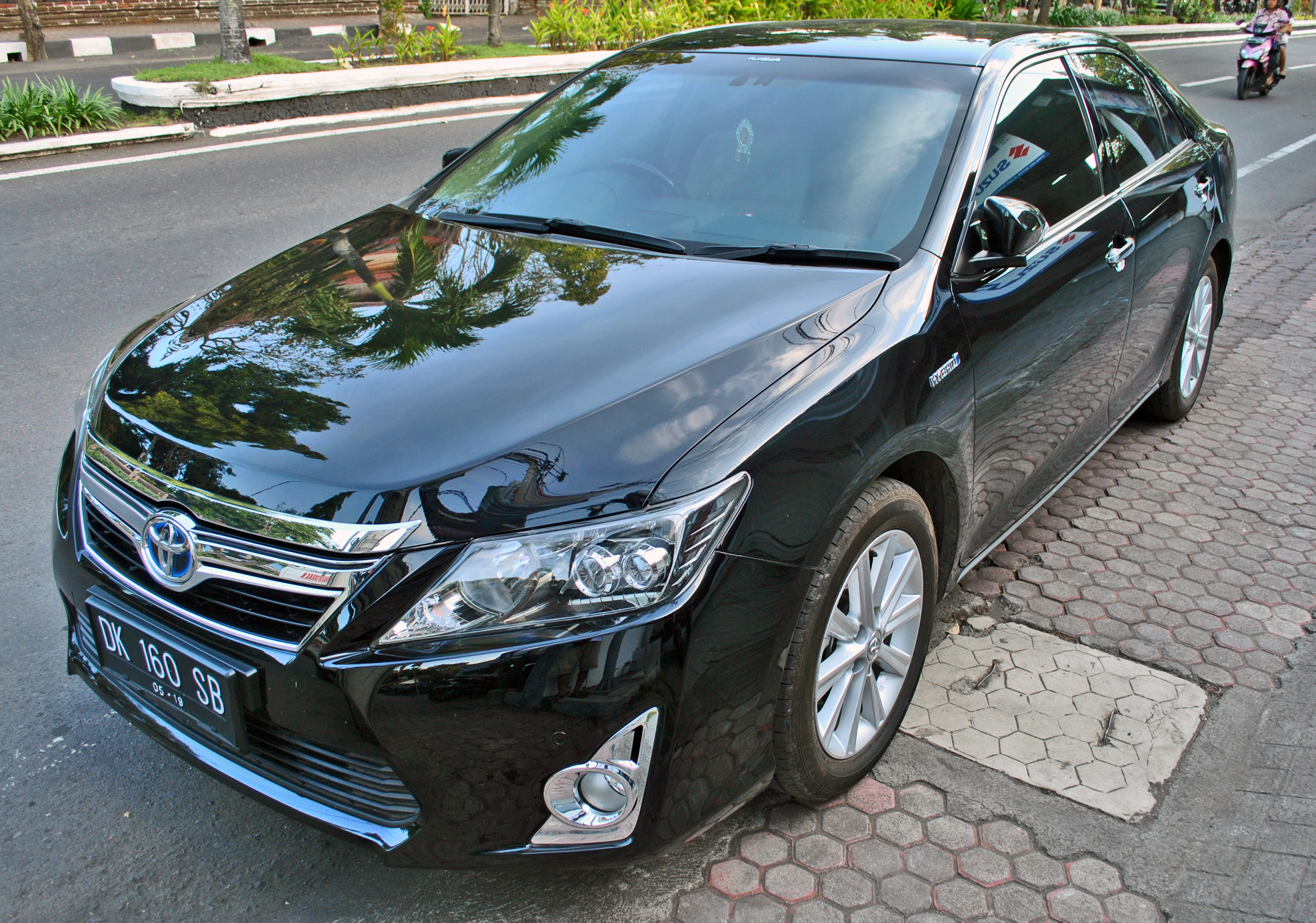
Camry Hybrid (Indonesia; pre-facelift)

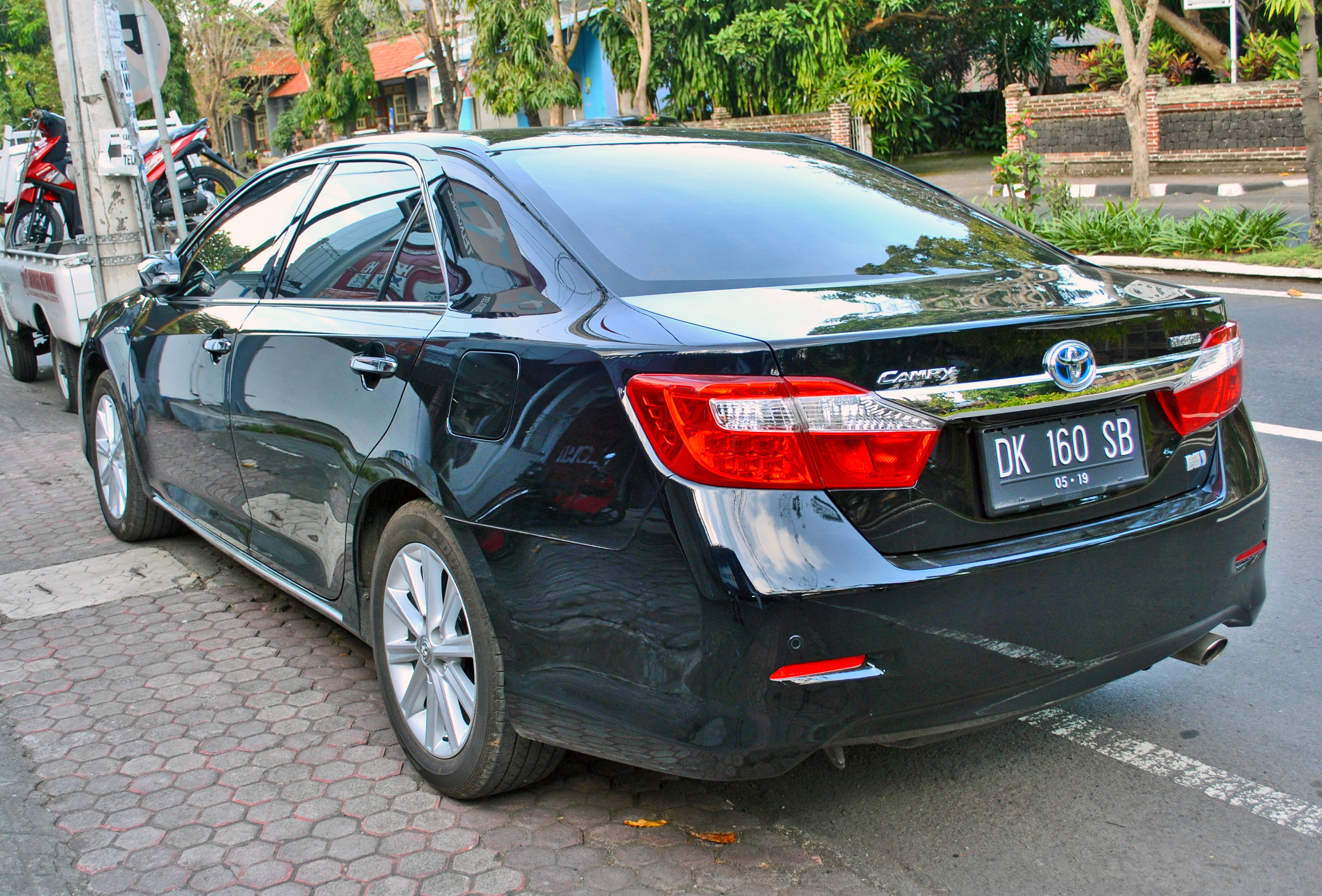
Camry Hybrid (Indonesia; pre-facelift)

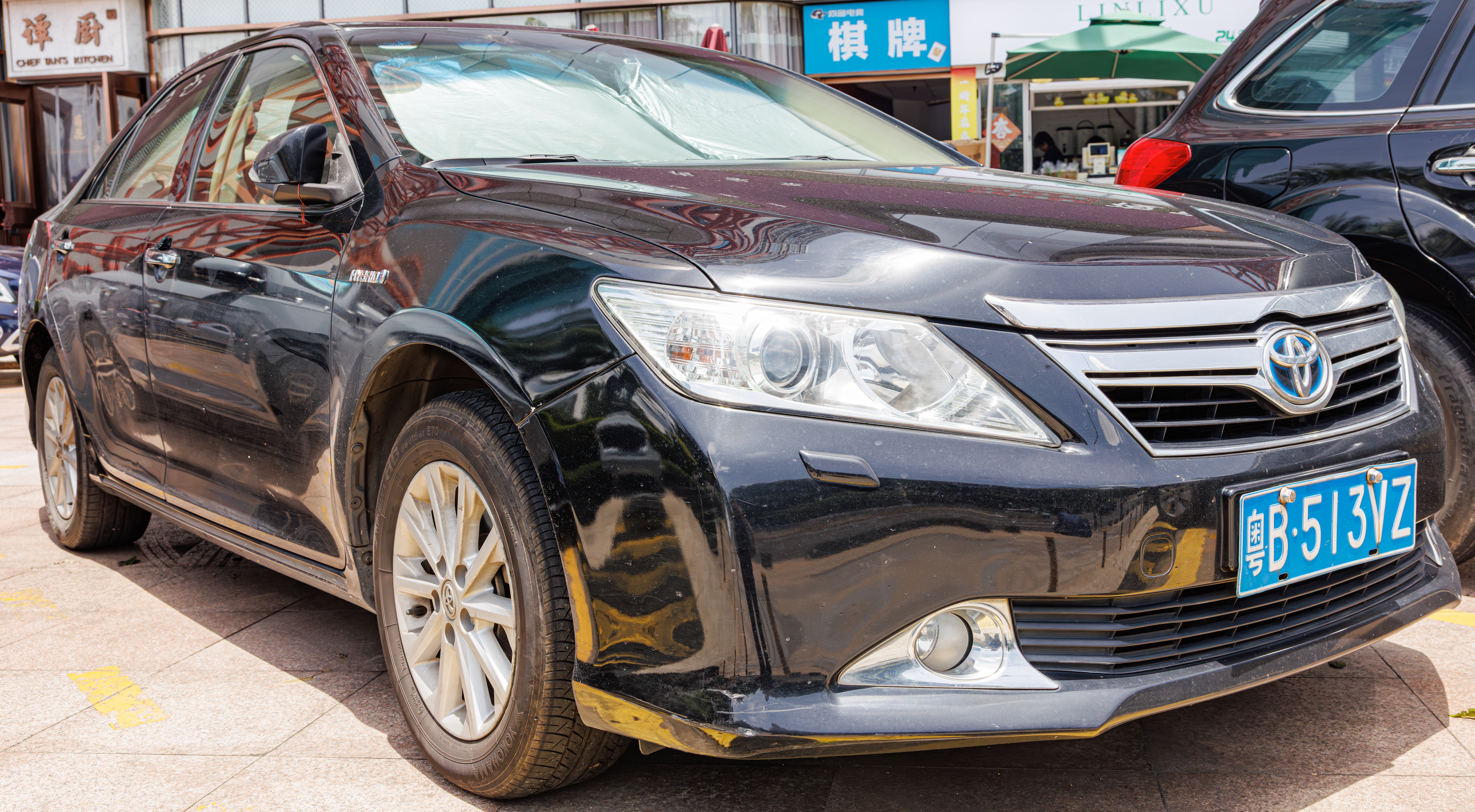
Camry Hybrid (China; pre-facelift)

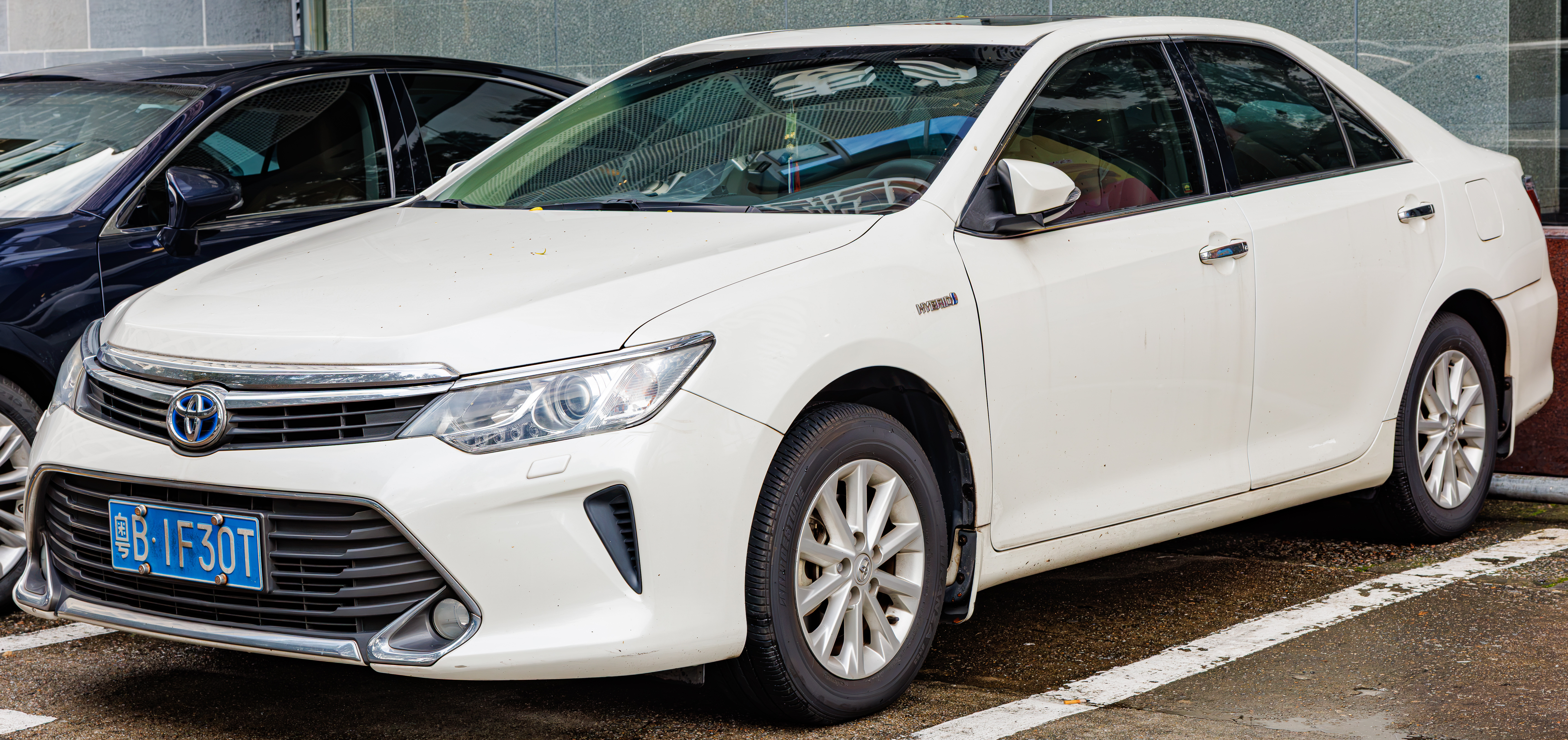
Camry Hybrid (China; facelift)

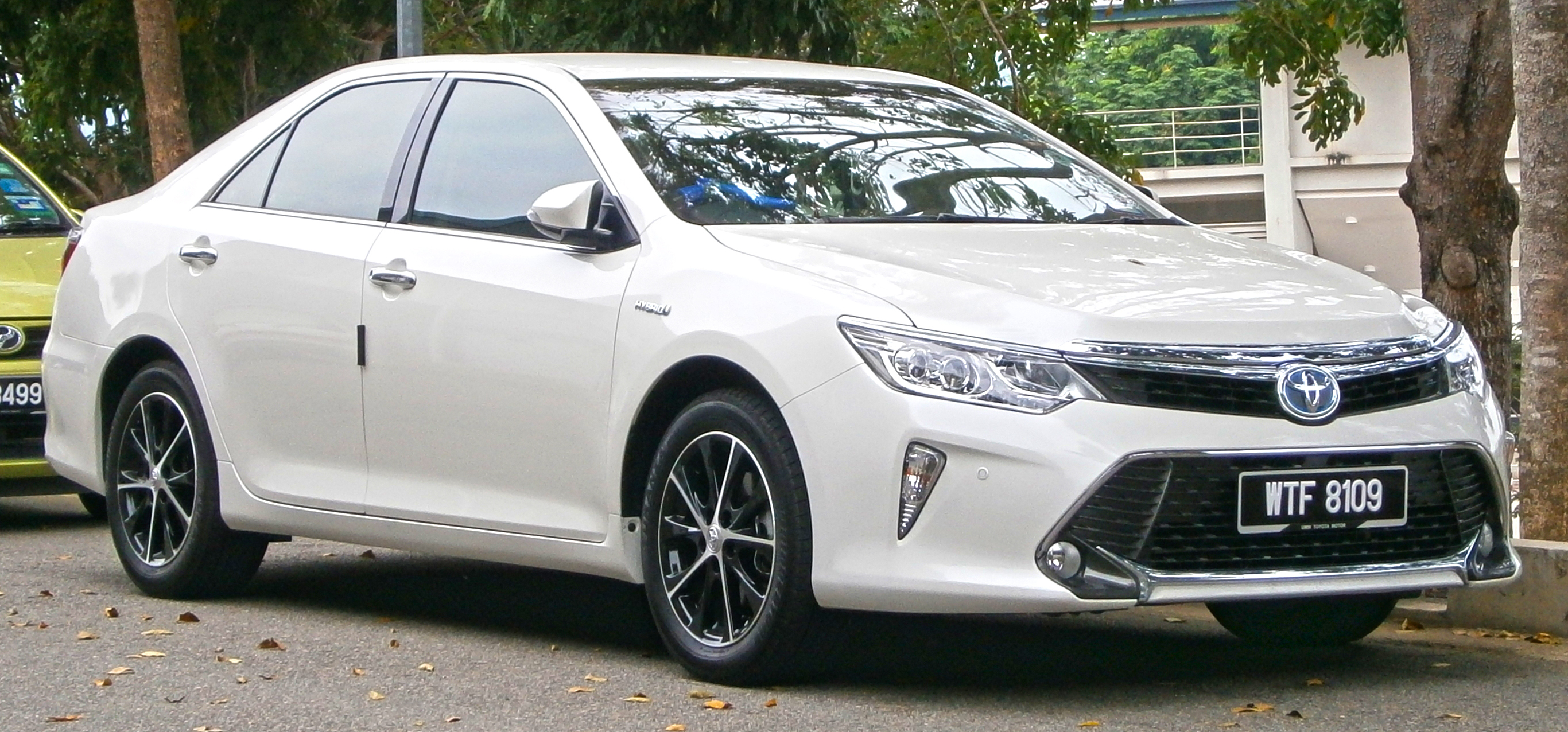
Camry Hybrid (Malaysia; facelift)

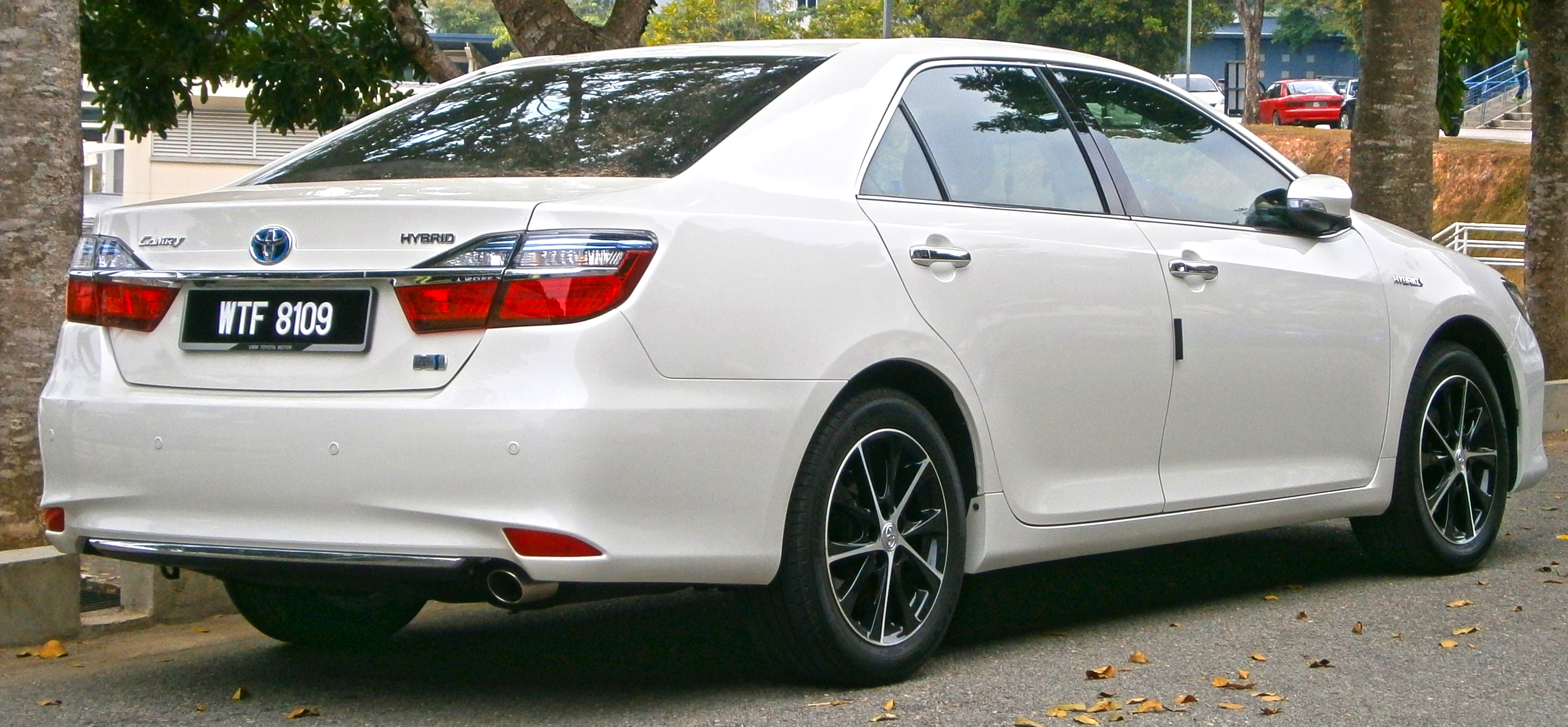
Camry Hybrid (Malaysia; facelift)

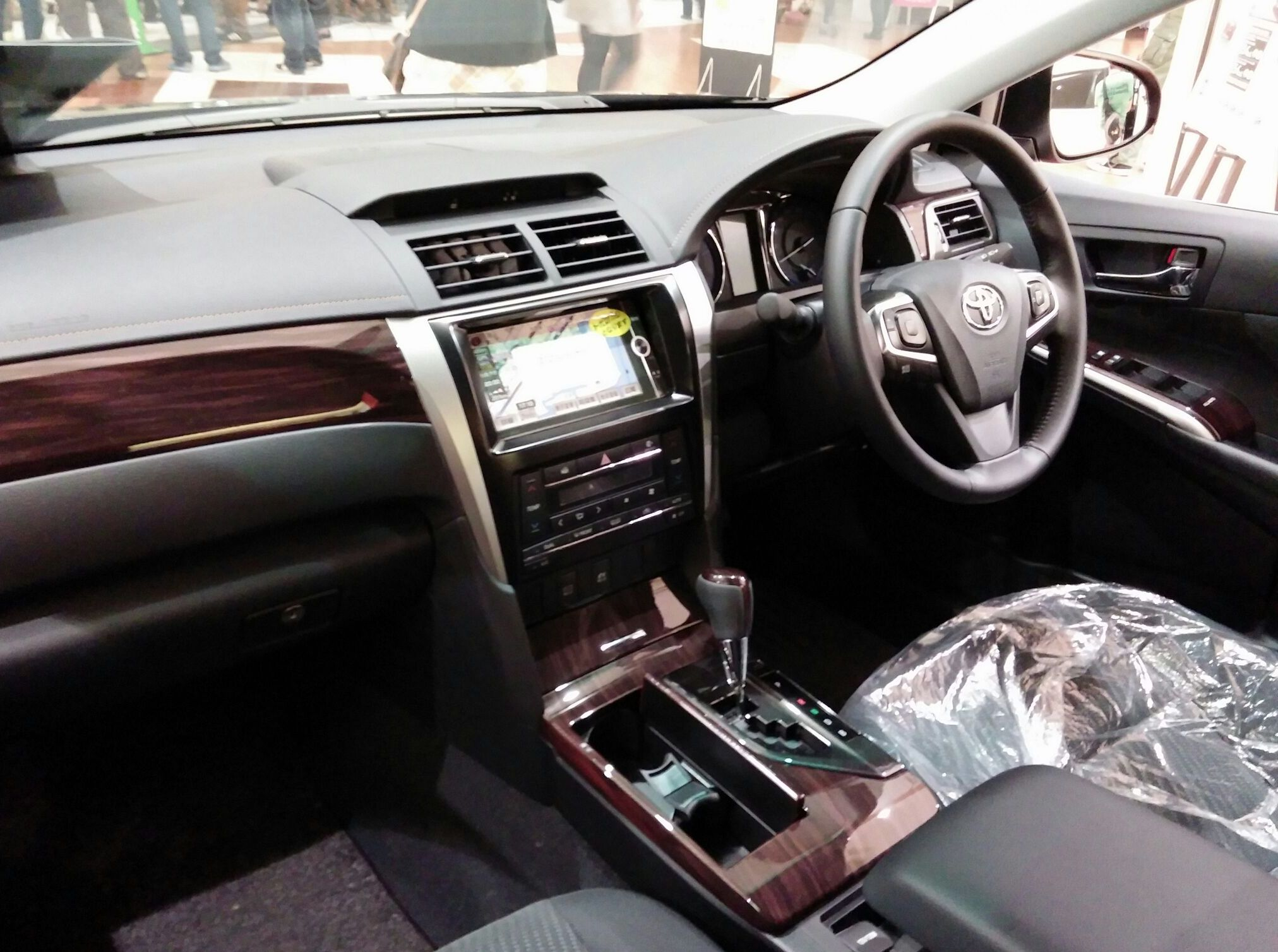
Interior (Japan; facelift)

== See also ==
Media related to Toyota Camry (XV50) at Wikimedia Commons
