= Xuân Hòa =

Xuân Hòa may refer to several places in Vietnam, including:

- Xuân Hòa, Ho Chi Minh City, a ward of Ho Chi Minh City
- Xuân Hòa, Phú Thọ, a ward of Phú Thọ Province
