= Xuân Hòa, Phú Thọ =

Xuân Hòa Phường Xuân Hòa
- Ward
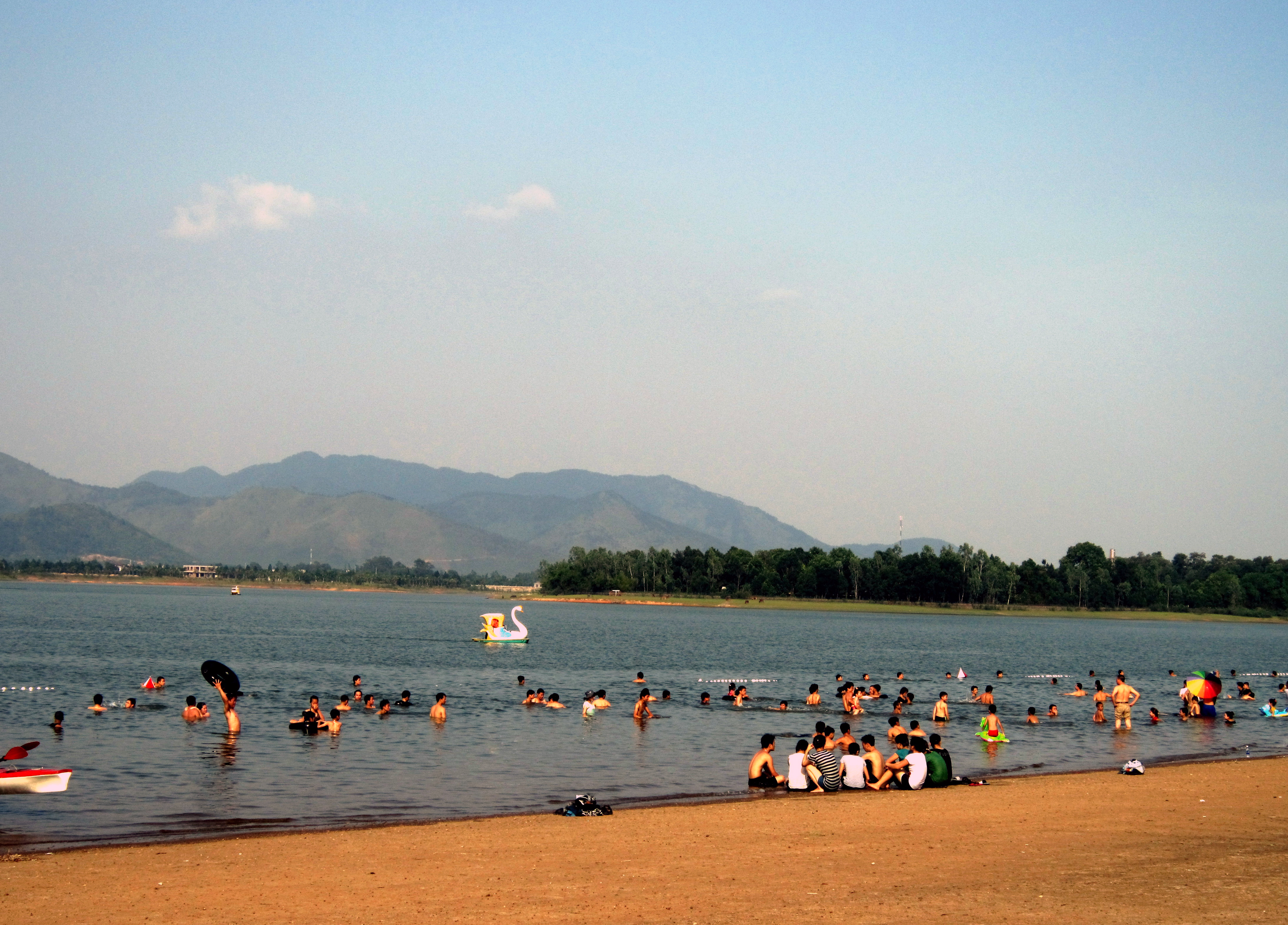
- Đại Lải Lake
- Interactive map of Xuân Hòa
- Location in Vietnam
- Country: Vietnam
- Regions: Northeast
- Province: Phú Thọ Province
- Established: June 16, 2025

Area
  - Total: 96.00 km^{2} (37.07 sq mi)

Population (2025)
  - Total: 55,237
  - Density: 575.4/km^{2} (1,490/sq mi)
- Time zone: UTC+07:00 (Indochina Time)

Xuân Hòa is a ward (phường) of Phú Thọ Province, Vietnam.

== Geography ==
Xuân Hòa Ward located in northeastern Phú Thọ Province, and adjacent to:

- Thái Nguyên Province to the north
- Phúc Yên Ward to the south
- Bình Nguyên Commune and Bình Tuyền Commune to the west
- Hanoi City to the east.

== History ==
On June 12, 2025, the National Assembly of Vietnam issued Resolution No. 202/2025/QH15 on the arrangement of provincial-level administrative units (effective from June 12, 2025). Accordingly, the entire land area and population of Vĩnh Phúc Province, Hòa Bình Province and Phú Thọ Province were merged to form a new province named Phú Thọ Province.

On June 16, 2025, the Standing Committee of the National Assembly of Vietnam issued Resolution No. 1676/NQ-UBTVQH15 on the arrangement of commune-level administrative units of Phú Thọ Province in 2025 (effective from June 16, 2025). Accordingly, the entire land area and population of Đồng Xuân Ward, Xuân Hòa Ward, Cao Minh Commune and Ngọc Thanh Commune were merged to form a new ward named Xuân Hòa Ward.
