= Phúc Yên =

Phúc Yên Phường Phúc Yên
- Ward
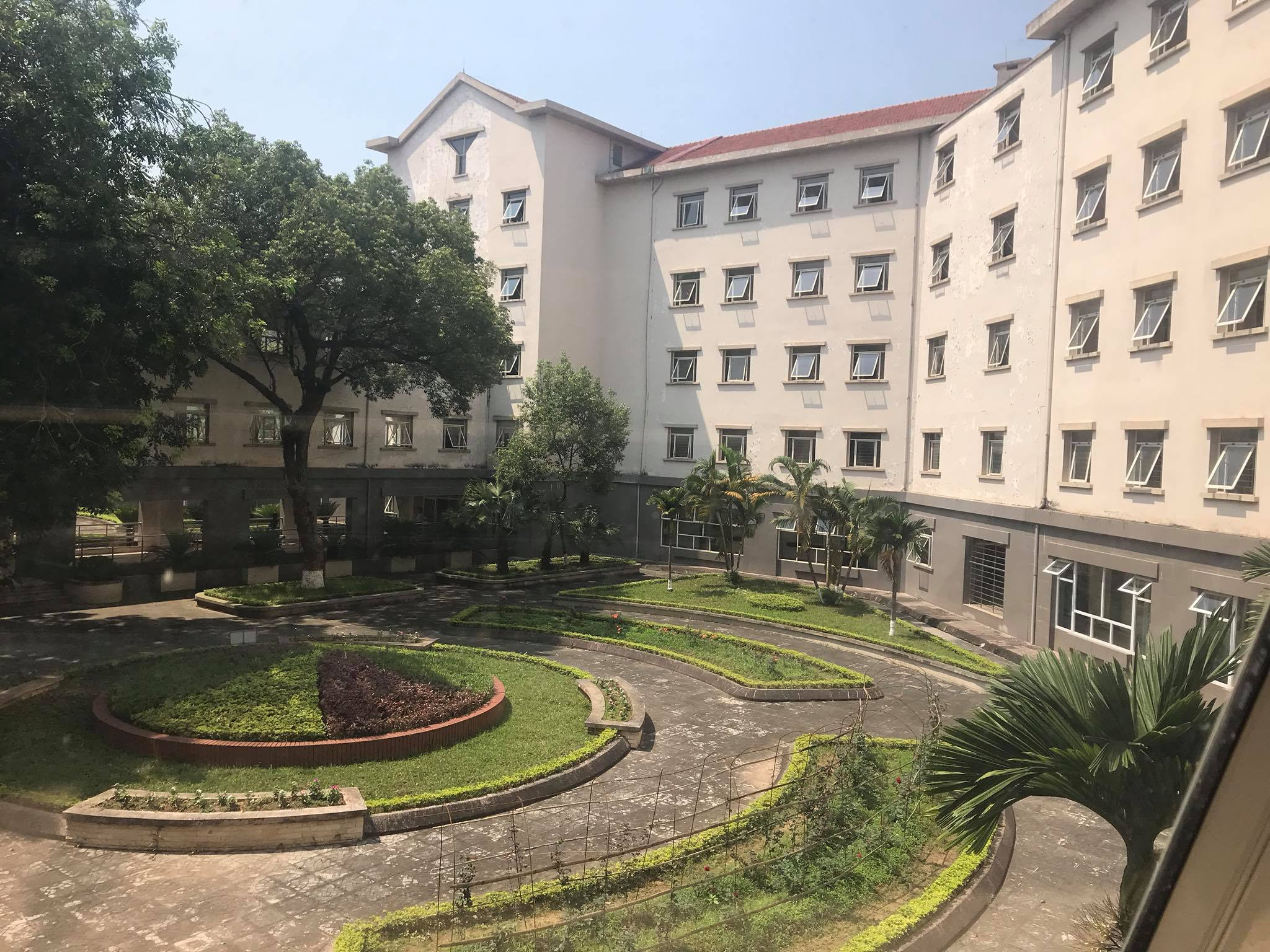
- Hospital 74 Central
- Interactive map of Phúc Yên
- Country: Vietnam
- Regions: Northeast
- Province: Phú Thọ Province
- Established: June 16, 2025

Area
  - Total: 23.40 km^{2} (9.03 sq mi)

Population (2025)
  - Total: 63,954
  - Density: 2,733/km^{2} (7,079/sq mi)
- Time zone: UTC+07:00 (Indochina Time)

Phúc Yên is a ward (phường) of Phú Thọ Province, Vietnam.

== Geography ==
Phúc Yên Ward located in northeastern Phú Thọ Province, and adjacent to:

- Xuân Hòa Ward to the north
- Hanoi City to the south
- Bình Nguyên Commune and Xuân Lãng Commune to the west
- Hanoi City to the east.

== History ==
On June 12, 2025, the National Assembly of Vietnam issued Resolution No. 202/2025/QH15 on the arrangement of provincial-level administrative units (effective from June 12, 2025). Accordingly, the entire land area and population of Vĩnh Phúc Province, Hòa Bình Province and Phú Thọ Province were merged to form a new province named Phú Thọ Province.

On June 16, 2025, the Standing Committee of the National Assembly of Vietnam issued Resolution No. 1676/NQ-UBTVQH15 on the arrangement of commune-level administrative units of Phú Thọ Province in 2025 (effective from June 16, 2025). Accordingly, the entire land area and population of Hùng Vương, Hai Bà Trưng, Phúc Thắng, Tiền Châu, and Nam Viêm Wards (Phúc Yên City) were merged to form a new ward named Phúc Yên Ward.
