= Phúc Yên (city) =

- Provincial city (Class-3)
- Phúc Yên City; Thành phố Phúc Yên
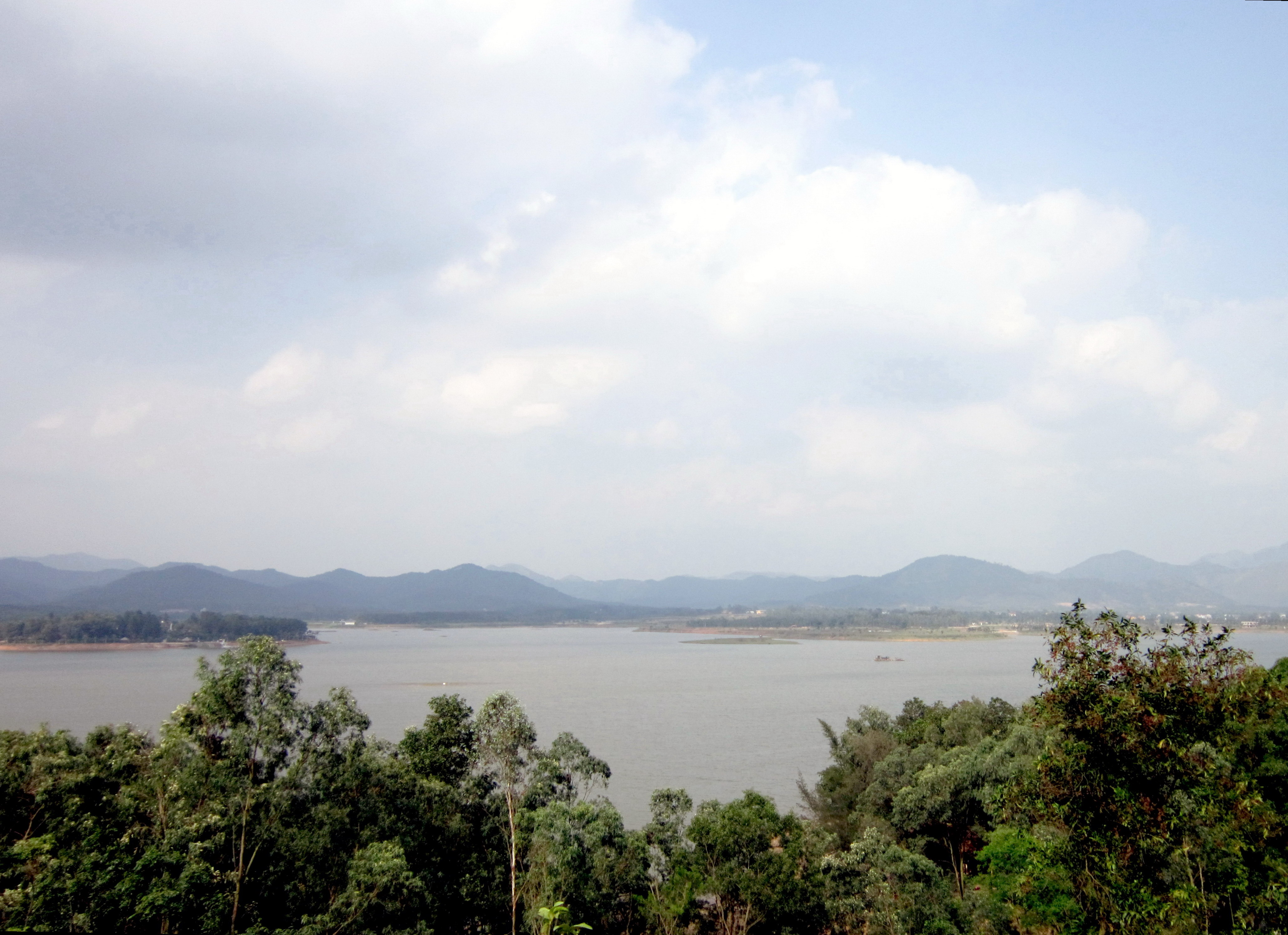
- Hồ Đại Lải

- Seal
- Interactive map of Phúc Yên
- Location of Phúc Yên in Vietnam
- Coordinates: 21°14′N 105°42′E
- Country: Vietnam
- Province: Vĩnh Phúc
- Capital: Phúc Yên

Area
  - Total: 120 km^{2} (46 sq mi)

Population (2003)
  - Total: 83,352
  - Density: 1,295/km^{2} (3,350/sq mi)
- Website: phucyen.vinhphuc.gov.vn

Phúc Yên is a former city in Vĩnh Phúc Province in the Red River Delta region of Vietnam. As of 2003 the district had a population of 83,352. The district covers an area of 120 km^{2}. The district capital lies at Phúc Yên. The city is on National Route 2 heading North-West out of Hanoi to the city of Vĩnh Yên.
