= Cẩm Khê district =

Cẩm Khê District Huyện Cẩm Khê
- District
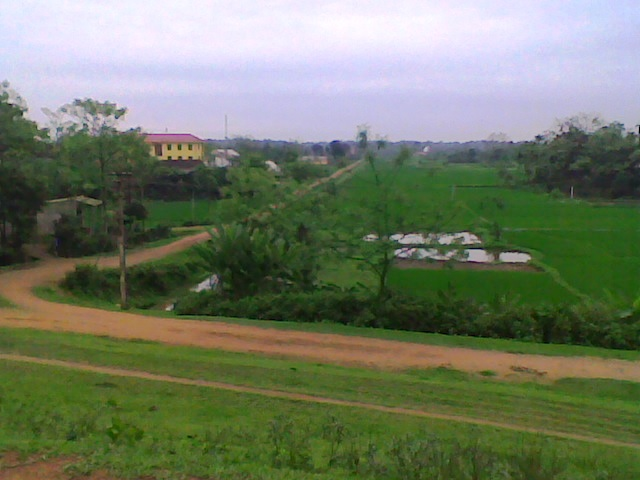
- Interactive map of Cẩm Khê District
- Country: Vietnam
- Region: Northeast
- Province: Phú Thọ
- Founded: 1841
- Capital: Cẩm Khê

Government
  - District Party Committee Secretary: Nguyễn Mạnh Hùng
  - Chairman of the People's Council: Nguyễn Mạnh Hùng
  - Chairman of the People's Committee: Cù Xuân Ân

Area
  - Total: 90.4 sq mi (234.2 km^{2})

Population (2019)
  - Total: 139,424
  - Density: 1,540/sq mi (594/km^{2})
- Time zone: UTC+7 (Indochina Time)
- Website: camkhe.phutho.gov.vn

Cẩm Khê is a former mountainous district in western Phú Thọ province, Vietnam. The district borders Hạ Hòa district to the north, Tam Nông district to the south, Yên Lập district to the west, and Thanh Ba district to the east. It covers an area of 234.2 square kilometres.

According to 2002 census figures, the district has a population of 128,537 and a workforce of 65,720.

== Administrative divisions ==
The district contains one township, Sông Thao, and 30 communes:

- Cát Trù
- Cấp Dẫn
- Chương Xá
- Điêu Lương
- Đồng Cam
- Đồng Lương
- Hiền Đa
- Hương Lung
- Ngô Xá
- Phú Khê
- Phú Lạc
- Phùng Xá
- Phương Xá
- Phượng Vĩ
- Sai Nga
- Sơn Nga
- Sơn Tình
- Tam Sơn
- Tạ Xá
- Thanh Nga
- Thụy Liễu
- Tiên Lương
- Tình Cương
- Tùng Khê
- Tuy Lộc
- Văn Bán
- Văn Khúc
- Xương Thịnh
- Yên Dưỡng
- Yên Tậρ
