= Thanh Sơn =

Thanh Sơn may refer to several places in Vietnam, including:

- Thanh Sơn District, a rural district of Phú Thọ province
- Thanh Sơn, Ninh Thuận, a ward of Phan Rang-Tháp Chàm
- Thanh Sơn, Uông Bí, a ward of Uông Bí in Quảng Ninh province
- Thanh Sơn, Bắc Giang, a township of Sơn Động District
- Thanh Sơn, Phú Thọ, a township and capital of Thanh Sơn District
- Thanh Sơn, Haiphong, a commune of Kiến Thụy District
- Thanh Sơn, Định Quán, a commune of Định Quán District in Đồng Nai province
- Thanh Sơn, Tân Phú, a commune of Tân Phú District, Đồng Nai
- Thanh Sơn, Hà Nam, a commune of Kim Bảng District
- Thanh Sơn, Hải Dương, a commune of Thanh Hà District
- Thanh Sơn, Lạng Sơn, a commune of Hữu Lũng District
- Thanh Sơn, Nghệ An, a commune of Thanh Chương District
- Thanh Sơn, Ba Chẽ, a commune of Ba Chẽ District in Quảng Ninh province
- Thanh Sơn, Như Xuân, a commune of Như Xuân District in Thanh Hóa province
- Thanh Sơn, Tĩnh Gia, a commune of Tĩnh Gia District in Thanh Hóa province
- Thanh Sơn, Trà Vinh, a commune of Trà Cú District
