= Xuan Son (disambiguation) =

Xuân Sơn may refer to several places in Vietnam, including:

- Xuân Sơn, Ho Chi Minh City, a commune in the former Châu Đức district, Bà Rịa–Vũng Tàu province
- Xuân Sơn, Hanoi, formerly a commune of Sơn Tây town until 2025, now part of Tùng Thiện
- Xuân Sơn, Khánh Hòa, formerly a commune of Vạn Ninh district until 2025, now part of Vạn Hưng
- Xuân Sơn, Nghệ An, formerly a commune of Đô Lương district until 2025, now part of Thuần Trung
- Xuân Sơn, Phú Thọ, formerly a commune of Tân Sơn district until 2025, now part of Xuân Đài, Phú Thọ
  - Xuân Sơn National Park, a nature reserve in Phú Thọ province
    - Xuan Son virus, isolated in bats in Xuân Sơn National Park
