= Vân Phú =

Vân Phú Phường Vân Phú
- Ward
- Interactive map of Vân Phú
- Location in Vietnam
- Country: Vietnam
- Regions: Northeast
- Province: Phú Thọ Province
- Established: June 16, 2025

Area
  - Total: 26.26 km^{2} (10.14 sq mi)

Population (2025)
  - Total: 37,450
  - Density: 1,426/km^{2} (3,694/sq mi)
- Time zone: UTC+07:00 (Indochina Time)

Vân Phú is a ward (phường) of Phú Thọ Province, Vietnam.

== Geography ==
Vân Phú Ward located in central Phú Thọ Province, and adjacent to:

- Phù Ninh Commune and Bình Phú Commune to the north
- Nông Trang Ward and Việt Trì Ward to the south
- Hy Cương Commune to the west
- Sông Lô Commune to the east.

== History ==
On June 12, 2025, the National Assembly of Vietnam issued Resolution No. 202/2025/QH15 on the arrangement of provincial-level administrative units (effective from June 12, 2025). Accordingly, the entire land area and population of Vĩnh Phúc Province, Hòa Bình Province and Phú Thọ Province were merged to form a new province named Phú Thọ Province.

On June 16, 2025, the Standing Committee of the National Assembly of Vietnam issued Resolution No. 1676/NQ-UBTVQH15 on the arrangement of commune-level administrative units of Phú Thọ Province in 2025 (effective from June 16, 2025). Accordingly, the entire land area and population of Vân Phú Ward and Phượng Lâu, Hùng Lô, and Kim Đức Communes were merged to form a new ward named Vân Phú.
