= Hy Cương =

Commune in Northeast, Vietnam

Hy Cương Xã Hy Cương
- Commune
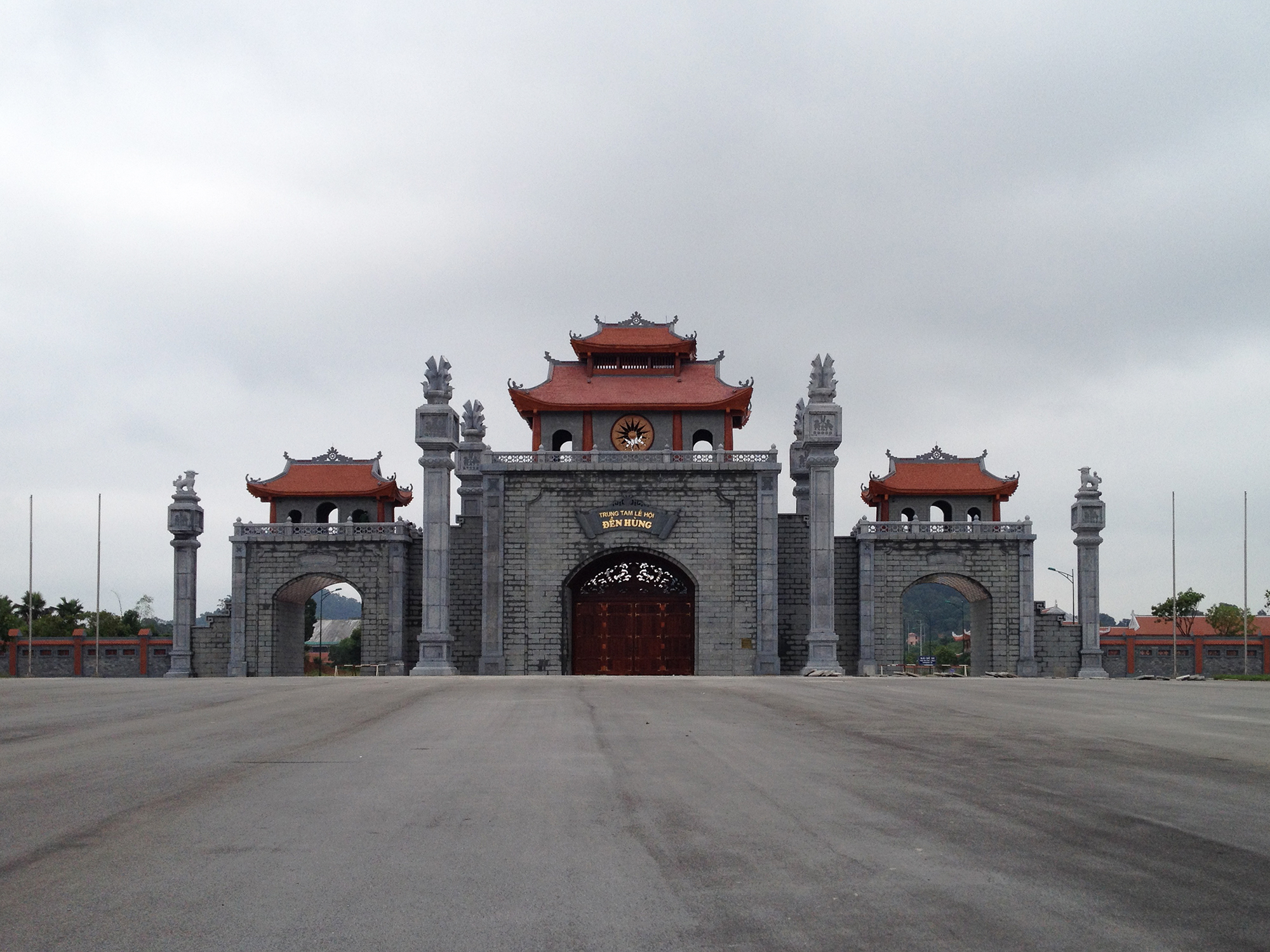
- Hùng Temple
- Interactive map of Hy Cương
- Location in Vietnam
- Country: Vietnam
- Region: Northeast
- Province: Phú Thọ Province
- Established: June 16, 2025

Area
  - Total: 23.95 km^{2} (9.25 sq mi)

Population (2025)
  - Total: 22,693
  - Density: 947.5/km^{2} (2,454/sq mi)
- Time zone: UTC+07:00 (Indochina Time)

Hy Cương is a commune (xã) of Phú Thọ Province, Vietnam.

== Geography ==
Hy Cương Commune located in central Phú Thọ Province, and adjacent to:

- Phù Ninh Commune to the north
- Phùng Nguyên Commune and Bản Nguyên Commune to the south
- Lâm Thao Commune to the west
- Nông Trang Ward and Vân Phú Ward to the east.

== History ==
On June 12, 2025, the National Assembly of Vietnam issued Resolution No. 202/2025/QH15 on the arrangement of provincial-level administrative units (effective from June 12, 2025). Accordingly, the entire land area and population of Vĩnh Phúc Province, Hòa Bình Province and Phú Thọ Province were merged to form a new province named Phú Thọ Province.

On June 16, 2025, the Standing Committee of the National Assembly of Vietnam issued Resolution No. 1676/NQ-UBTVQH15 on the arrangement of commune-level administrative units of Phú Thọ Province in 2025 (effective from June 16, 2025). Accordingly, the entire land area and population of Thanh Đình, Chu Hóa and Hy Cương Commune were merged to form a new commune named Hy Cương Commune.
