= Ngọc Sơn =

Ngọc Sơn may refer to several commune-level subdivisions in Vietnam, including:

- Ngọc Sơn, Haiphong, a ward of Kiến An District
- Ngọc Sơn, Đô Lương, a commune of Đô Lương District in Nghệ An Province
- Ngọc Sơn, Bắc Giang, a commune of Hiệp Hòa District
- Ngọc Sơn, Hà Nam, a commune of Kim Bảng District
- Ngọc Sơn, Hòa Bình, a commune of Lạc Sơn District
- Ngọc Sơn, Thanh Hóa, a commune of Ngọc Lặc District
- Ngọc Sơn, Quỳnh Lưu, a commune of Quỳnh Lưu District in Nghệ An Province
- Ngọc Sơn, Hà Tĩnh, a commune of Thạch Hà District
- Ngọc Sơn, Thanh Chương, a commune of Thanh Chương District in Nghệ An Province
- Ngọc Sơn, Hải Dương, a commune of Tứ Kỳ District

== See also ==
- Ngọc Sơn Temple
- Ngọc Sơn (singer)
