= Xuan Son virus =

Xuan Son mobatvirus

Virus classification
- (unranked): Virus
- Realm: Riboviria
- Kingdom: Orthornavirae
- Phylum: Negarnaviricota
- Class: Bunyaviricetes
- Order: Elliovirales
- Family: Hantaviridae
- Genus: Mobatvirus
- Species: Xuan Son mobatvirus

Species of virus

Xuan Son virus (XSV) is a single-stranded, enveloped, negative-sense RNA virus of the genus Mobatvirus.

== Natural reservoir ==
It was isolated in Pomona roundleaf bats in Xuân Sơn National Park, a nature reserve in Thanh Sơn District, Phú Thọ Province, Vietnam, within a 50-mile radius of Hanoi.
