= Thao River =

River in China, and in Vietnam

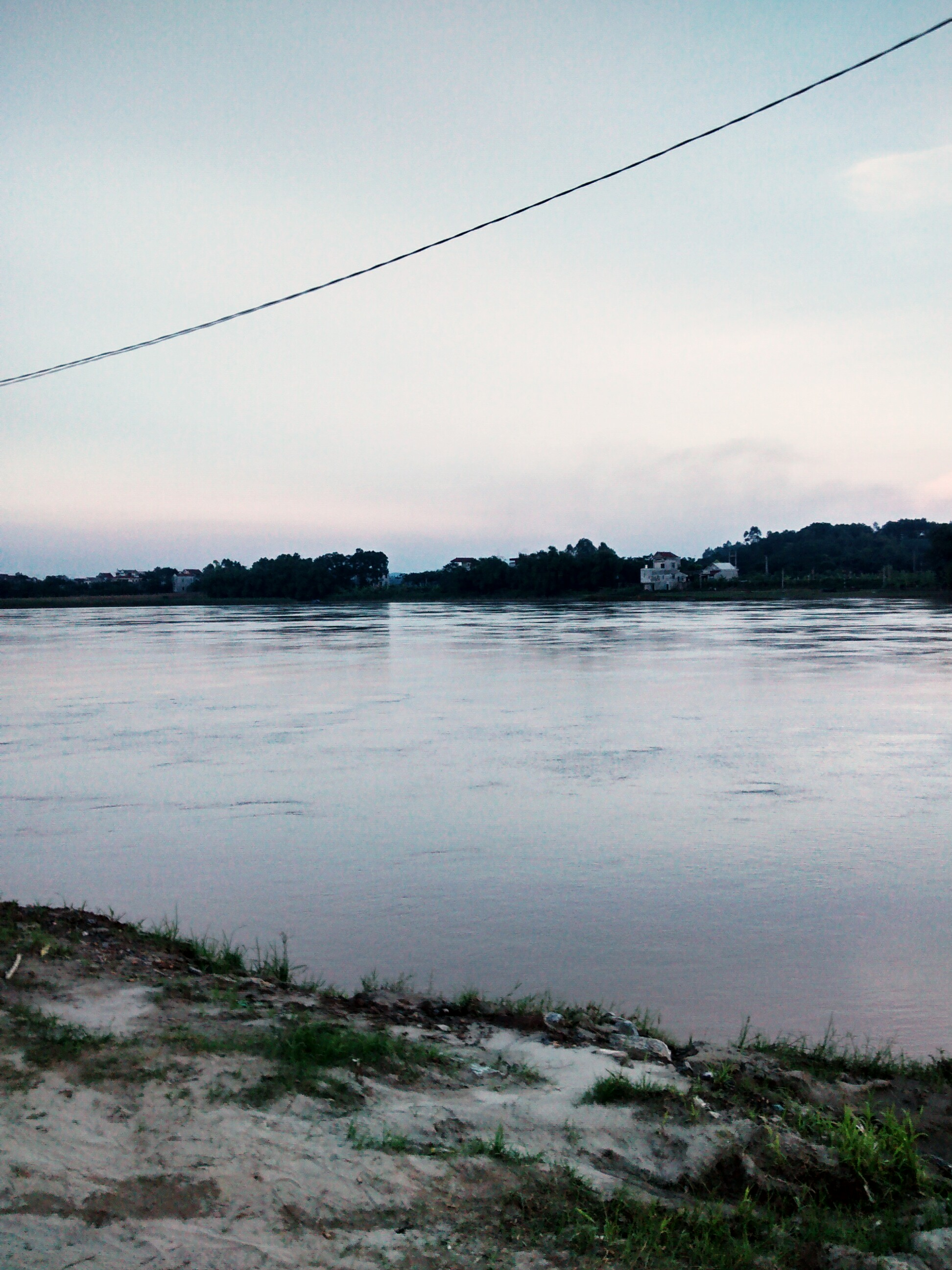
- Thao River in Cam Khe District, Phu Tho Province, Vietnam
- Native name: Sông Thao (Vietnamese)

Location
- Country: China, Vietnam

Physical characteristics
- Source
  - location: Weishan Yi and Hui Autonomous County, Yunnan Province, China
  - elevation: 547 m (1,795 ft)
- Length: 910 km (570 mi)
- Basin size: 51,800 km^{2} (20,000 sq mi)(China: 39,800 km^{2} (15,400 sq mi), Vietnam: 12,000 km^{2} (4,600 sq mi))

Thao River (Vietnamese: sông Thao) is the upper stretch of the Red River, originates from Weishan Yi and Hui Autonomous County, Yunnan Province, China, flows through three Vietnamese provinces, including Lao Cai Province, Yen Bai Province and Phu Tho Province. Thao River merges with Black River and Lo River at Viet Tri City, Phu Tho Province, Vietnam.

The river in China is called Yuan River (Chinese: 元江; Vietnamese: Nguyên Giang).

The river is known for Song Thao Campaign by Viet Minh in 1949, during the First Indochina War. The campaign started on 19 May and ended on 18 July, with the victory of Viet Minh over the French.
