= Phong Châu (ward) =

Phong Châu Phường Phong Châu
- Ward
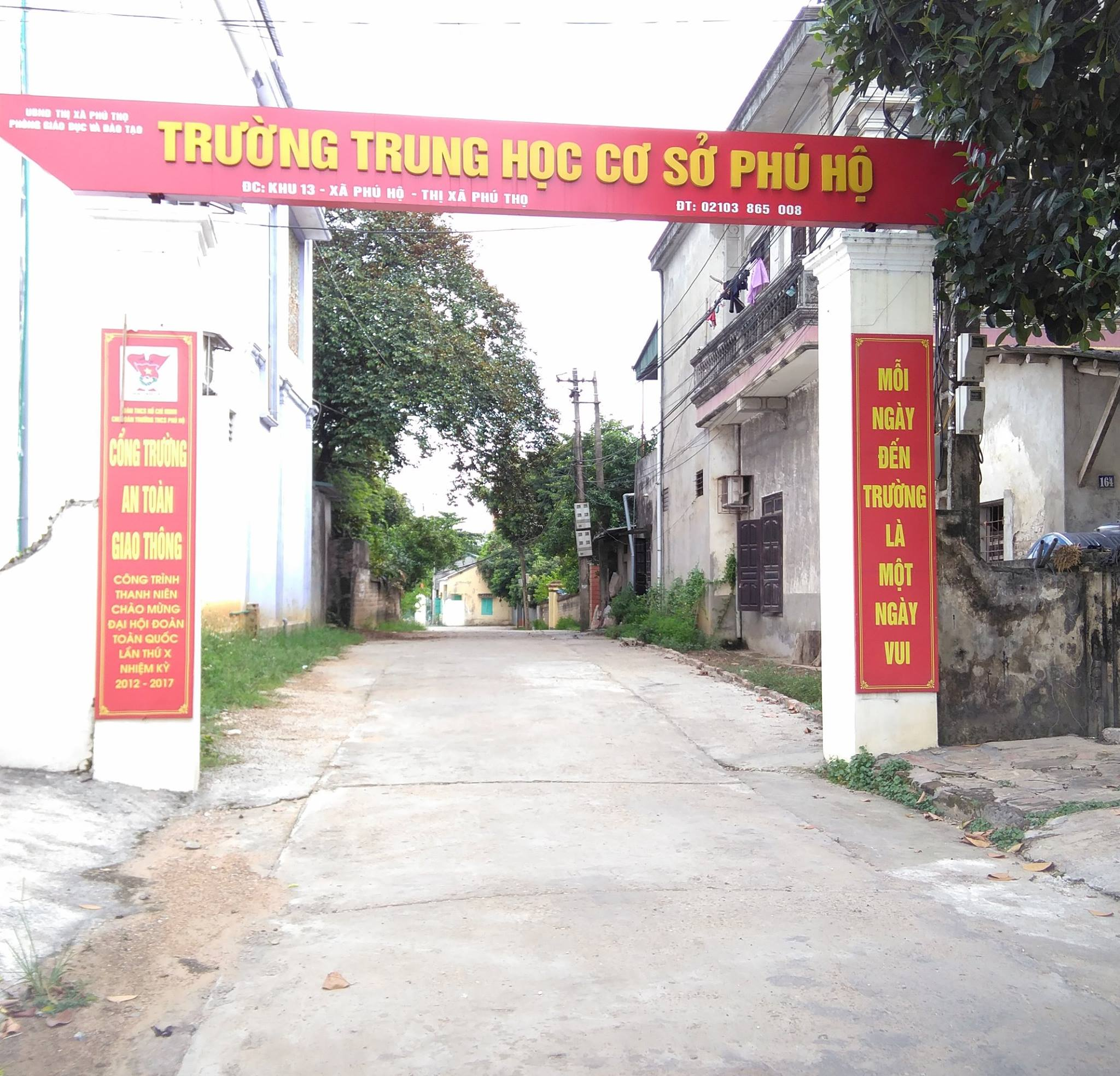
- Phong Châu Lower Secondary School (former Phú Hộ Lower Secondary School)
- Interactive map of Phong Châu
- Location in Vietnam
- Country: Vietnam
- Regions: Northeast
- Province: Phú Thọ Province
- Established: June 16, 2025

Area
  - Total: 29.61 km^{2} (11.43 sq mi)

Population (2025)
  - Total: 32,519
  - Density: 1,098/km^{2} (2,844/sq mi)
- Time zone: UTC+07:00 (Indochina Time)

Phong Châu is a ward (phường) of Phú Thọ Province, Vietnam.

== Geography ==
Phong Châu Ward located in central Phú Thọ Province, and adjacent to:

- Trạm Thản Commune to the north
- Hiền Quan Commune and Xuân Lũng Commune to the south
- Phú Thọ Ward and Âu Cơ Ward to the west
- Phù Ninh Commune to the east.

== History ==
On June 12, 2025, the National Assembly of Vietnam issued Resolution No. 202/2025/QH15 on the arrangement of provincial-level administrative units (effective from June 12, 2025). Accordingly, the entire land area and population of Vĩnh Phúc Province, Hòa Bình Province and Phú Thọ Province were merged to form a new province named Phú Thọ Province.

On June 16, 2025, the Standing Committee of the National Assembly of Vietnam issued Resolution No. 1676/NQ-UBTVQH15 on the arrangement of commune-level administrative units of Phú Thọ Province in 2025 (effective from June 16, 2025). Accordingly, the entire land area and population of Phong Châu Ward, Phú Hộ Commune and Hà Thạch Commune were merged to form a new ward named Phong Châu Ward.
