= Mount Ten =

Mountain in Vietnam

Ten (núi Ten) is a mountain of the Xuân Sơn National Park in Phú Thọ Province in northern Vietnam. It is the second highest point in the park at 1244 metres.
