= Mount Voi =

Mountain in Phú Thọ Province, Vietnam

Voi (núi Voi, núi Ten và núi Cẩn) is a mountain of the Xuân Sơn National Park in Phú Thọ Province in northern Vietnam. It is the highest point in the park at 1347 metres.
