= Thanh Vân =

Thanh Vân may refer to several rural communes in Vietnam, including:

- Thanh Vân, Bắc Giang, a commune of Hiệp Hòa District
- Thanh Vân, Hà Giang, a commune of Quản Bạ District
- Thanh Vân, Phú Thọ, a commune of Thanh Ba District
- Thanh Vân, Vĩnh Phúc, a commune of Tam Dương District
