= Thao =

Thao may refer to:

- Thao people, a group of Taiwanese aborigines
- Thao language, also known as Sao
- Thao Nguyen, American singer-songwriter
  - Thao & the Get Down Stay Down, American musical group led by Nguyen
- Thai honorific Thao
- Thao Suranari, Thao Thep Kasattri and Thao Sri Sunthon, Thai heroines
- Thao Vang Lor, character in Gran Torino
- Brigadier General Thao Ma, commander of the Royal Lao Air Force
- Thao River, the upper reaches of the Hong River in northern Vietnam
