= Phu Khe =

Phu Khe may refer to:

- Phou Khe, a mountain at the Lao and Thai border
- Phú Khê, a village and commune in Vietnam
