= Nông Trang =

Nông Trang Phường Nông Trang
- Ward
- Hung Vuong University
- Interactive map of Nông Trang
- Location in Vietnam
- Country: Vietnam
- Regions: Northeast
- Province: Phú Thọ Province
- Established: June 16, 2025

Area
  - Total: 15.89 km^{2} (6.14 sq mi)

Population (2025)
  - Total: 57,770
  - Density: 3,636/km^{2} (9,416/sq mi)
- Time zone: UTC+07:00 (Indochina Time)

Nông Trang is a ward (phường) of Phú Thọ Province, Vietnam.

== Geography ==
Nông Trang Ward located in central Phú Thọ Province, and adjacent to:

- Vân Phú Ward to the north
- Bản Nguyên Commune to the south
- Hy Cương Commune to the west
- Việt Trì Ward to the east.

== History ==
On June 12, 2025, the National Assembly of Vietnam issued Resolution No. 202/2025/QH15 on the arrangement of provincial-level administrative units (effective from June 12, 2025). Accordingly, the entire land area and population of Vĩnh Phúc Province, Hòa Bình Province and Phú Thọ Province were merged to form a new province named Phú Thọ Province.

On June 16, 2025, the Standing Committee of the National Assembly of Vietnam issued Resolution No. 1676/NQ-UBTVQH15 on the arrangement of commune-level administrative units of Phú Thọ Province in 2025 (effective from June 16, 2025). Accordingly, the entire land area and population of Minh Phương, Nông Trang Wards and Thụy Vân Commune were merged to form a new ward named Nông Trang Ward.
