= Mount Cẩn =

Mountain in Vietnam

núi Cẩn is a mountain of the Xuân Sơn National Park in Phú Thọ Province in northern Vietnam. It is the third highest point in the park at 1,144 metres (3,753 ft). The Park also contains núi Voi and núi Ten.
