= Thanh Miếu =

Thanh Miếu Phường Thanh Miếu
- Ward
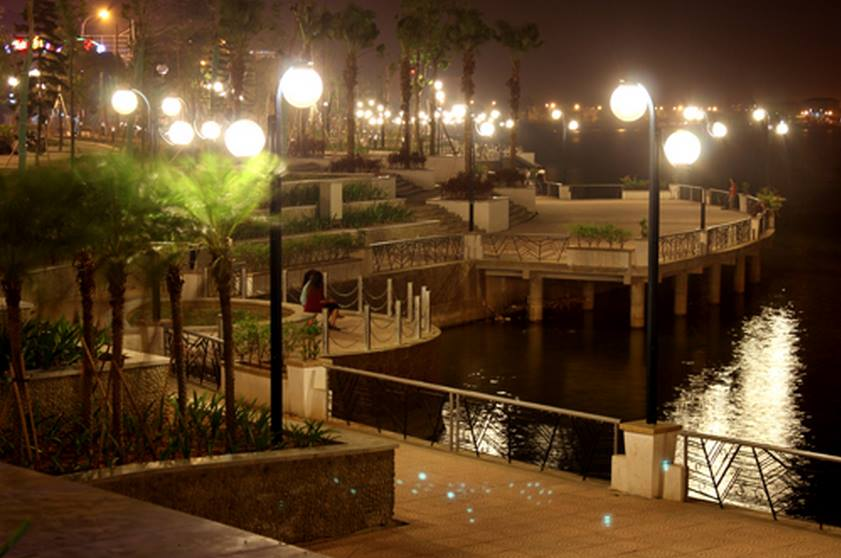
- Văn Lang Park
- Interactive map of Thanh Miếu
- Location in Vietnam
- Country: Vietnam
- Regions: Northeast
- Province: Phú Thọ Province
- Established: June 16, 2025

Area
  - Total: 19.57 km^{2} (7.56 sq mi)

Population (2025)
  - Total: 58,548
  - Density: 2,992/km^{2} (7,749/sq mi)
- Time zone: UTC+07:00 (Indochina Time)

Thanh Miếu is a ward (phường) of Phú Thọ Province, Vietnam.

== Geography ==
Thanh Miếu Ward located in central Phú Thọ Province, and adjacent to:

- Việt Trì Ward to the north
- Vĩnh Thành Commune to the south
- Hanoi City to the west
- Sơn Đông Commune to the east.

== History ==
On June 12, 2025, the National Assembly of Vietnam issued Resolution No. 202/2025/QH15 on the arrangement of provincial-level administrative units (effective from June 12, 2025). Accordingly, the entire land area and population of Vĩnh Phúc Province, Hòa Bình Province and Phú Thọ Province were merged to form a new province named Phú Thọ Province.

On June 16, 2025, the Standing Committee of the National Assembly of Vietnam issued Resolution No. 1676/NQ-UBTVQH15 on the arrangement of commune-level administrative units of Phú Thọ Province in 2025 (effective from June 16, 2025). Accordingly, the entire land area and population of Thọ Sơn, Tiên Cát, Bạch Hạc, Thanh Miếu Wards, and Sông Lô Commune were merged to form a new ward named Thanh Miếu Ward.
