= Myotis indochinensis =

Conservation status
- Data Deficient (IUCN 3.1)

Scientific classification
- Kingdom: Animalia
- Phylum: Chordata
- Class: Mammalia
- Order: Chiroptera
- Family: Vespertilionidae
- Genus: Myotis
- Species: M. indochinensis

Binomial name
- Myotis indochinensis Son, 2013
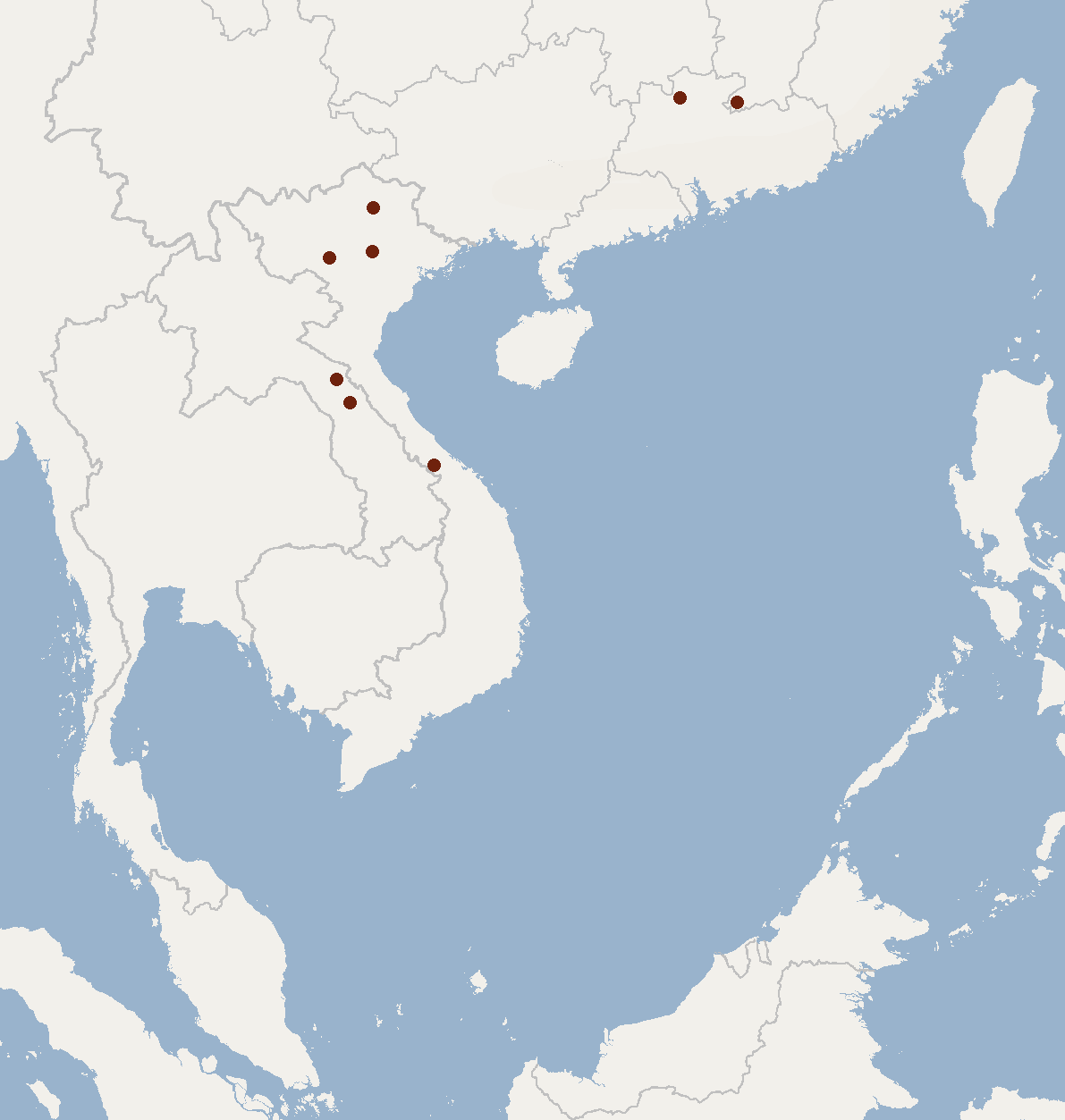
- Distribution

Species of bat

Myotis indochinensis, commonly known as the Indochinese mouse-eared bat, is a species of cave-dwelling bat in the family Vespertilionidae. It is found in Vietnam and China.

== Taxonomy ==
Specimens belonging to this species were previously confused with Myotis montivagus and Myotis annectans. However, they were later recognized on the basis of their larger external, cranial measurements and well-developed sagittal and lambdoid crests.

== Distribution and habitat ==
The species is found in Huế, Tam Đảo National Park, Na Hang Nature Reserve, Mường La District, Mộc Châu, Ta Xua Nature Reserve, and Xuân Sơn National Park. Barcoding sequences were published from Laos: Nam Pakkatan, Nakai Plateau (Khammouane Province) and Nam Pan (Bolikhamsai Province); Hà Tĩnh, Vietnam; and China: Guangxi, Jiangxi, Guangdong.

The species is at least partially cave-dwelling and is also known to range and roost in forests.

== Threats ==
Although very little is known about the species, it may be under threat from the disturbance of caves and logging in its habitat.

== Conservation ==
The species may occur in protected areas spread across its range.
