= Âu Cơ (ward) =

Âu Cơ Phường Âu Cơ
- Ward
- Interactive map of Âu Cơ
- Location in Vietnam
- Country: Vietnam
- Regions: Northeast
- Province: Phú Thọ Province
- Established: June 16, 2025

Area
  - Total: 12.51 km^{2} (4.83 sq mi)

Population (2025)
  - Total: 18,951
  - Density: 1,515/km^{2} (3,923/sq mi)
- Time zone: UTC+07:00 (Indochina Time)

Âu Cơ is a ward (phường) of Phú Thọ Province, Vietnam.

== Geography ==
Âu Cơ Ward located in central Phú Thọ Province, and adjacent to:

- Đông Thành Commune to the north
- Liên Minh Commune to the south
- Chí Tiên Commune to the west
- Phú Thọ Ward, Phong Châu Ward, and Hiền Quan Commune to the east.

== History ==
On June 12, 2025, the National Assembly of Vietnam issued Resolution No. 202/2025/QH15 on the arrangement of provincial-level administrative units (effective from June 12, 2025). Accordingly, the entire land area and population of Vĩnh Phúc Province, Hòa Bình Province and Phú Thọ Province were merged to form a new province named Phú Thọ Province.

On June 16, 2025, the Standing Committee of the National Assembly of Vietnam issued Resolution No. 1676/NQ-UBTVQH15 on the arrangement of commune-level administrative units of Phú Thọ Province in 2025 (effective from June 16, 2025). Accordingly, the entire land area and population of Thanh Vinh Ward, Âu Cơ Ward and Thanh Minh Commune were merged to form a new ward named Âu Cơ Ward.
