= Xuân Thủy (disambiguation) =

Xuân Thủy may refer to:

== Places ==
- Xuân Thủy, Hòa Bình, a rural commune of Kim Bôi District.
- Xuân Thủy, Quảng Bình, a rural commune of Lệ Thủy District.
- Xuân Thủy, Nam Định, a rural commune of Xuân Trường District.
- Xuân Thủy, Phú Thọ, a rural commune of Yên Lập District.
- Xuân Thủy National Park in Nam Định Province.

== People ==
- Xuân Thủy (1912 - 1985), a North Vietnamese political figure
