= Phú Thọ, Phú Thọ =

Phú Thọ Phường Phú Thọ
- Ward
- Interactive map of Phú Thọ
- Country: Vietnam
- Regions: Northeast
- Province: Phú Thọ Province
- Established: June 16, 2025

Area
  - Total: 23.07 km^{2} (8.91 sq mi)

Population (2025)
  - Total: 27,957
  - Density: 1,212/km^{2} (3,139/sq mi)
- Time zone: UTC+07:00 (Indochina Time)

Phú Thọ is a ward (phường) of Phú Thọ province, Vietnam.

== Geography ==
Phú Thọ Ward located in central Phú Thọ province, and adjacent to:

- Đông Thành Commune and Trạm Thản Commune to the north
- Âu Cơ Ward to the west and southwest
- Phong Châu Ward to the east and southeast.

== History ==
On June 12, 2025, the National Assembly of Vietnam issued Resolution No. 202/2025/QH15 on the arrangement of provincial-level administrative units (effective from June 12, 2025). Accordingly, the entire land area and population of Vĩnh Phúc Province, Hòa Bình Province and Phú Thọ Province were merged to form a new province named Phú Thọ Province.

On June 16, 2025, the Standing Committee of the National Assembly of Vietnam issued Resolution No. 1676/NQ-UBTVQH15 on the arrangement of commune-level administrative units of Phú Thọ Province in 2025 (effective from June 16, 2025). Accordingly, the entire land area and population of Hùng Vương Ward, Hà Lộc Commune and Văn Lung Commune (Phú Thọ Town) were merged to form a new ward named Phú Thọ Ward.
