= Tân Sơn district =

Tân Sơn District Huyện Tân Sơn
- District
- Interactive map of Tân Sơn District
- Country: Vietnam
- Region: Northeast
- Province: Phú Thọ
- Time zone: UTC+7 (Indochina Time)

Tân Sơn is a former rural district of Phú Thọ province in the Northeast region of Vietnam.

== Climate ==
Climate data for Minh Đài, Tân Sơn district
Month	Jan	Feb	Mar	Apr	May	Jun	Jul	Aug	Sep	Oct	Nov	Dec	Year
Record high °C (°F)	32.8 (91.0)	36.4 (97.5)	38.7 (101.7)	40.4 (104.7)	41.2 (106.2)	40.9 (105.6)	41.0 (105.8)	39.9 (103.8)	38.0 (100.4)	35.4 (95.7)	33.1 (91.6)	36.5 (97.7)	41.2 (106.2)
Mean daily maximum °C (°F)	19.4 (66.9)	20.8 (69.4)	23.6 (74.5)	27.9 (82.2)	31.5 (88.7)	33.0 (91.4)	33.0 (91.4)	32.5 (90.5)	31.3 (88.3)	28.8 (83.8)	25.4 (77.7)	21.6 (70.9)	27.4 (81.3)
Daily mean °C (°F)	15.7 (60.3)	17.3 (63.1)	20.0 (68.0)	23.8 (74.8)	26.6 (79.9)	28.0 (82.4)	28.1 (82.6)	27.6 (81.7)	26.4 (79.5)	23.9 (75.0)	20.3 (68.5)	16.8 (62.2)	22.9 (73.2)
Mean daily minimum °C (°F)	13.4 (56.1)	14.9 (58.8)	17.8 (64.0)	21.2 (70.2)	23.4 (74.1)	24.6 (76.3)	24.9 (76.8)	24.6 (76.3)	23.3 (73.9)	20.9 (69.6)	17.2 (63.0)	13.6 (56.5)	19.9 (67.8)
Record low °C (°F)	1.5 (34.7)	3.8 (38.8)	5.6 (42.1)	12.4 (54.3)	15.4 (59.7)	15.5 (59.9)	17.7 (63.9)	21.4 (70.5)	15.9 (60.6)	10.9 (51.6)	5.5 (41.9)	0.5 (32.9)	0.5 (32.9)
Average precipitation mm (inches)	36.1 (1.42)	35.2 (1.39)	55.0 (2.17)	100.4 (3.95)	216.5 (8.52)	236.2 (9.30)	267.4 (10.53)	310.0 (12.20)	233.3 (9.19)	147.1 (5.79)	54.2 (2.13)	26.7 (1.05)	1,718 (67.64)
Average rainy days	12.8	13.9	16.6	16.1	16.3	15.7	17.5	17.8	13.4	11.1	8.0	8.2	169.7
Average relative humidity (%)	87.3	88.0	88.0	87.3	85.3	84.6	85.5	87.3	86.4	86.0	85.0	84.8	86.3
Mean monthly sunshine hours	64.7	50.6	55.4	92.8	161.2	161.5	178.0	172.5	170.2	153.1	128.6	116.1	1,504.6
Source: Vietnam Institute for Building Science and Technology

== See also ==
- Xuân Sơn National Park
