= Tam Nông district, Phú Thọ =

Coordinates: 21°15′06″N 105°17′32″E

Tam Nông district Huyện Tam Nông
- District
- Interactive map of Tam Nông district
- Country: Vietnam
- Region: Northeast
- Province: Phú Thọ
- Capital: Hưng Hóa

Area
  - Total: 60 sq mi (156 km^{2})

Population (2003)
  - Total: 82,370
- Time zone: UTC+7 (Indochina Time)

Tam Nông is a former rural district of Phú Thọ province in the Northeast region of Vietnam. As of 2003, the district had a population of 82,370. The district covers an area of 156 km^{2}. The district capital lies at Hưng Hóa.

== Administrative divisions ==
The district consists of the district capital, Hưng Hóa, and 17 communes: Hùng Đô, Quang Húc, Hiền Quan, Thanh Uyên, Tam Cường, Văn Lương, Cổ Tiết, Hương Nộn, Thọ Văn, Dị Nậu, Dân Quyền, Phương thịnh, Tề Lễ, Tứ Mỹ, Xuân Quang, Hương Nha and Vực Trường.
