= Thanh Sơn district =

Coordinates: 21.167°N 105.083°E

Thanh Sơn District Huyện Thanh Sơn
- District
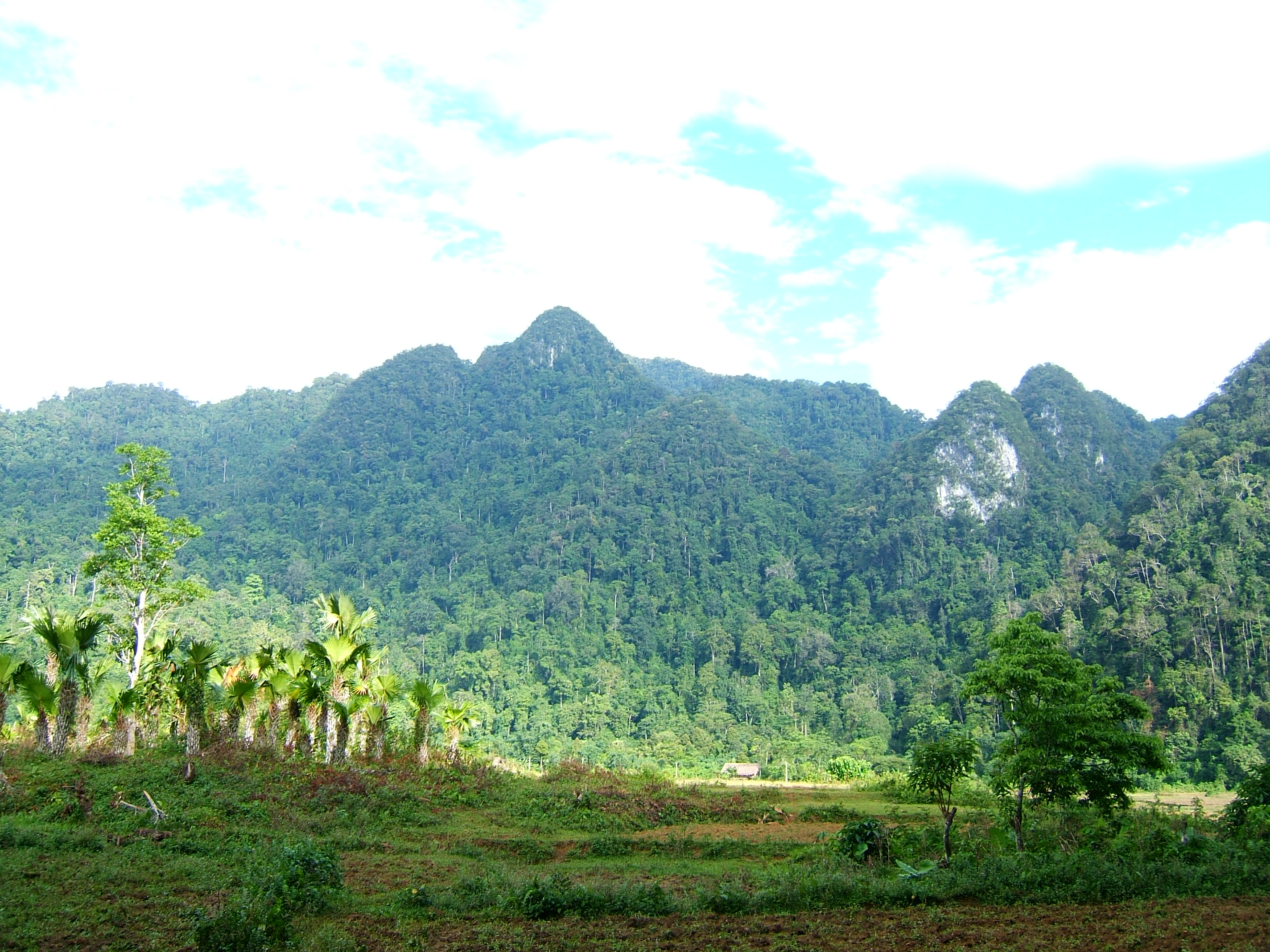
- Interactive map of Thanh Sơn District
- Country: Vietnam
- Region: Northeast
- Province: Phú Thọ
- Capital: Thanh Sơn

Area
  - Total: 505 sq mi (1,309 km^{2})

Population (2003)
  - Total: 187,700
- Time zone: UTC+7 (Indochina Time)

Thanh Sơn is a former rural district of Phú Thọ province in the Northeast region of Vietnam. The Xuân Sơn National Park lies within the district. As of 2003, the district had a population of 187,700. The district covers an area of 1,309 km^{2}. The district capital lies at Thanh Sơn.

== Administrative divisions ==
The district consists of the district capital, Thanh Sơn, and 22 communes: Sơn Hùng, Địch Quả, Giáp Lai, Thục Luyện, Võ Miếu, Thạch Khoán, Cự Thắng, Tất Thắng, Văn Miếu, Cự Đồng, Thắng Sơn, Tân Minh, Hương Cần, Khả Cửu, Tân Lập, Đông Cửu, Yên Lãng, Yên Lương, Thượng Cửu, Lương Nha, Yên Sơn and Tinh Nhuệ.
