= Hung Vuong University =

Public university in Phú Thọ Province, Vietnam

- Trường Đại học Hùng Vương
- Type: Public University
- Established: 2003
- Location: Nông Trang, Phú Thọ Province, Vietnam
- Website: hvu.edu.vn

Hung Vuong University (Vietnamese: Trường Đại học Hùng Vương, HVU) is a public university in Phú Thọ Province, Vietnam. Established in 2003 as the first university in Phú Thọ Province, it is now highly renowned university in Vietnam.
