= Yên Lập district =

Coordinates: 21.417°N 104.950°E

Yên Lập District Huyện Yên Lập
- District
- Interactive map of Yên Lập District
- Country: Vietnam
- Region: Northeast
- Province: Phú Thọ
- Capital: Yên Lập

Area
  - Total: 169 sq mi (437 km^{2})

Population (2003)
  - Total: 79,548
- Time zone: UTC+7 (Indochina Time)

Yên Lập is a former rural district of Phú Thọ province in the Northeast region of Vietnam. As of 2003 the district had a population of 79,548. The district covers an area of 437 km^{2}. The district capital lies at Yên Lập.

== Administrative divisions ==
The district consists of the district capital, Yên Lập, and 16 communes: Mỹ Lung, Mỹ Lương, Lương Sơn, Xuân An, Xuân Viên, Xuân Thủy, Hưng Long, Thượng Long, Nga Hoàng, Trung Sơn, Đồng Thịnh, Phúc Khánh, Ngọc Lập, Ngọc Đồng, Minh Hòa and Đồng Lạc.
