= Hùng Temple =

Temple complex in Vietnam

Coordinates: 21°22′07″N 105°19′27″E

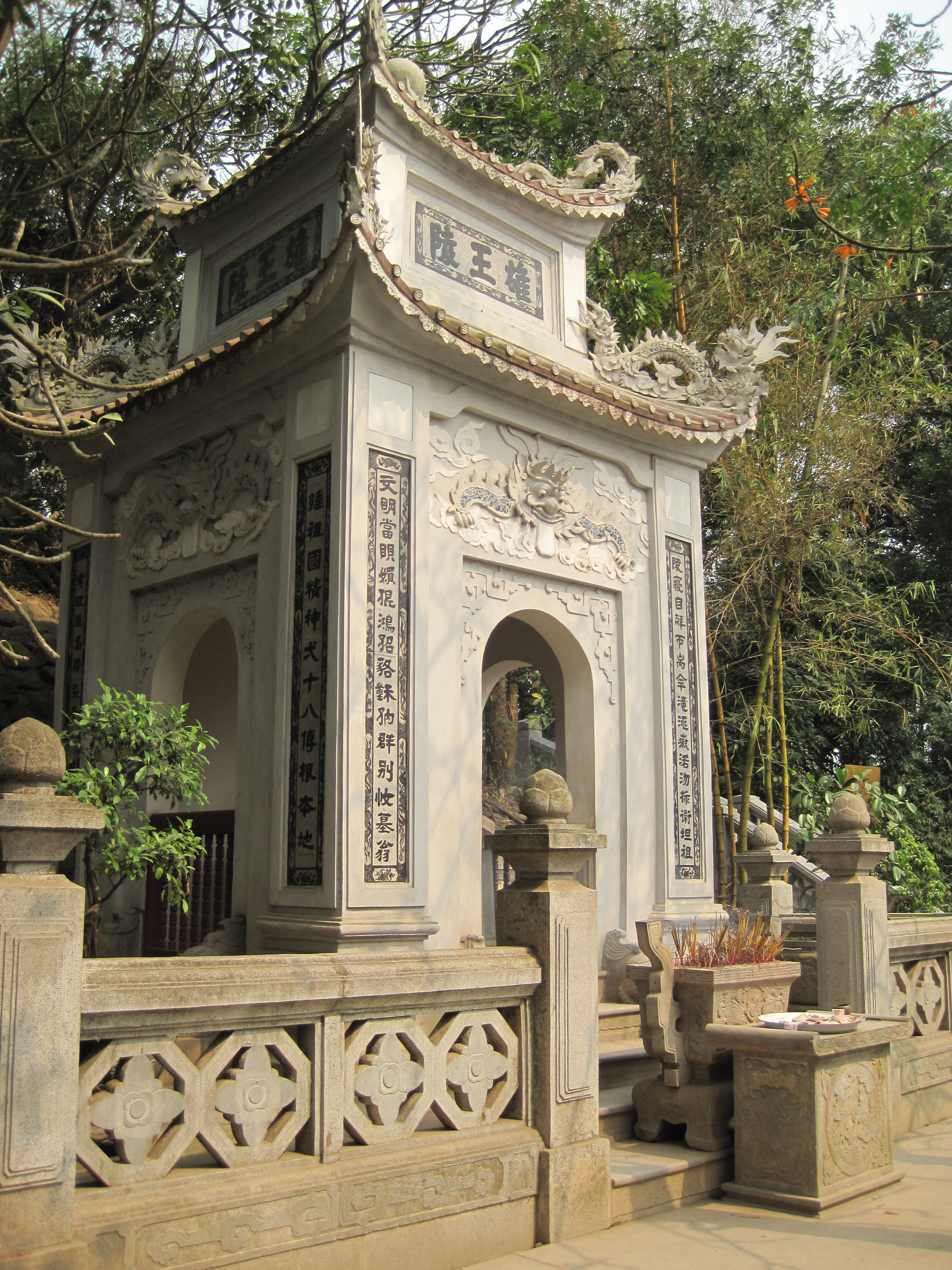
Mausoleum of Hùng Vương VI

Hùng Temple, centred at Nghĩa Lĩnh mountain in Phú Thọ province, is a temple complex in Vietnam.

== Background ==
The area is a complex consisting of several temples dedicated to the cult of Hùng Vương: the first descendants and the mythological founders of the Vietnamese, Lạc Long Quân and Âu Cơ. Styled sequentially as Hùng Vương I to Hùng Vương XVIII, the monarchs were the first dynastic rulers of Văn Lang, the primordial kingdom of the Vietnamese.

Popular belief designates the Hùng temple as also the site of Văn Lang's capital, Phong Châu. The kingdom is associated with the Đông Sơn culture and the famous bronze drums. For the successive Vietnamese dynasties and states, the Hùng Temples are revered with annual processional festivities known as Giỗ Tổ Hùng Vương held every 10th day of 3rd lunar month.

== Associated legend ==
Legend recounts that in his search for a site for his court, Hùng Vương I traveled to 99 places but found none to his satisfaction. Upon reaching the village of Hy Cương, the king's mount abruptly stopped and whinnied. The king climbed the highest peak Mount Nghĩa Lĩnh nearby where he scanned the four directions. It was then that he proclaimed the site as fitting of his capital.

== Modern history ==
Phạm Quỳnh made a pilgrimage to the temple complex in the late 1920s, describing it as a "symbol of the eternal soul of the nation".

In 1956, Trần Huy Liệu proposed that the anniversaries of the Hùng Kings' deaths be celebrated at the temple collectively.

== See also ==
- Hoa Lư
- Imperial Citadel of Thăng Long

== Sources ==
- Ngo, Thi Diem Hang (2016). The Rise of the Hung Temple: Shifting Constructions of Place, Religion and Nation in Contemporary Vietnam (PhD thesis). University of Adelaide.
