= Hạ Hòa district =

Coordinates: 21.667°N 105.033°E

Hạ Hòa district Huyện Hạ Hòa
- District
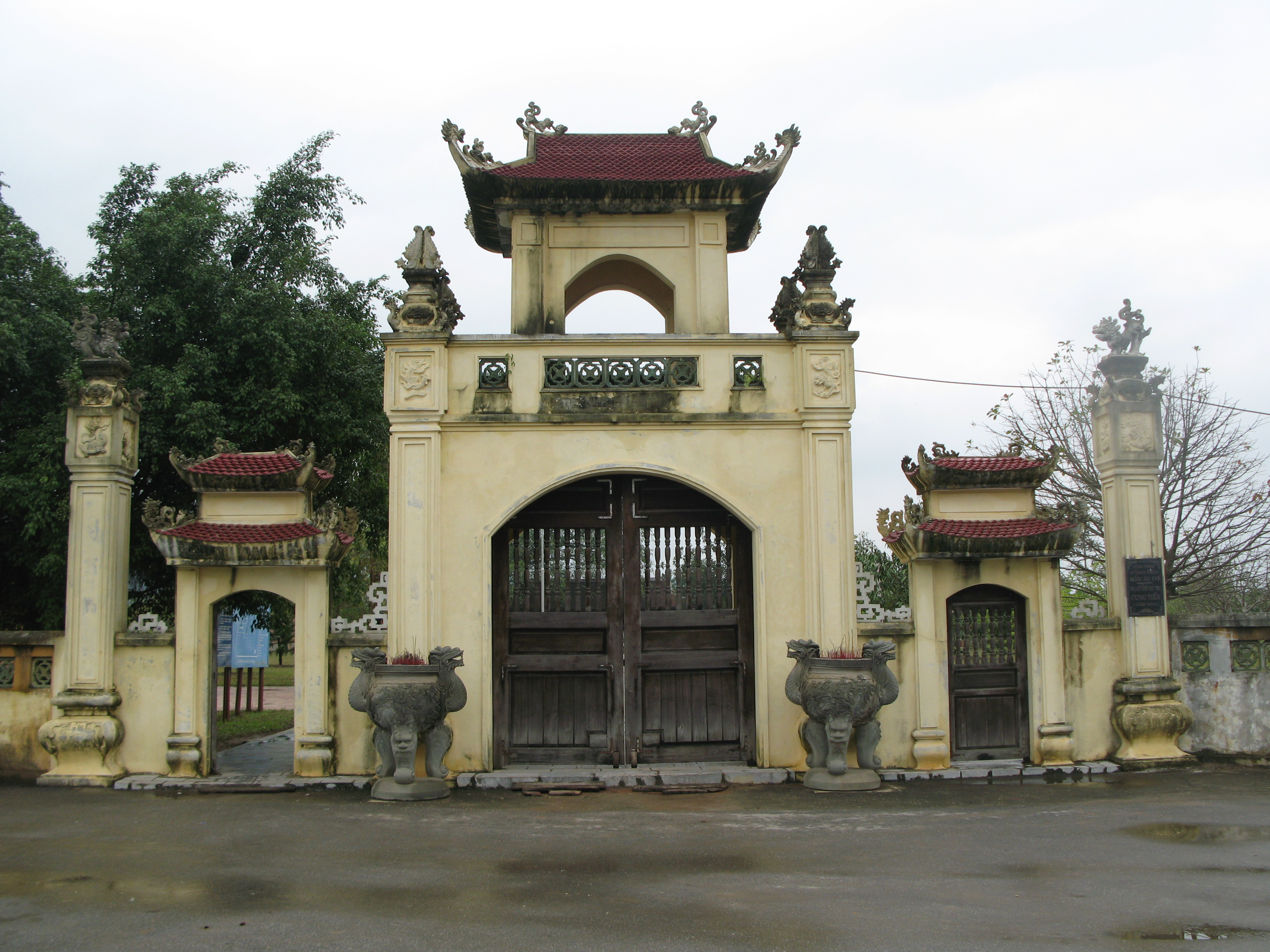
- Entrance to Đền thờ Mẫu Âu Cơ
- Interactive map of Hạ Hòa district
- Country: Vietnam
- Region: Northeast
- Province: Phú Thọ
- Capital: Hạ Hòa

Area
  - Total: 130 sq mi (340 km^{2})

Population (2003)
  - Total: 108,556
- Time zone: UTC+7 (Indochina Time)

Hạ Hòa is a former rural district of Phú Thọ province in the Northeast region of Vietnam. As of 2003, the district had a population of 108,556. The district covers an area of 340 km^{2}. The district capital lies at Hạ Hòa.

== Administrative divisions ==
The district consists of the district capital, Hạ Hòa, and 32 communes: Lệnh Khanh, Cáo Điền, Ấm Hạ, Phương Viên, Hậu Bổng, Đại Phạm, Đan Hà, Gia Điền, Y Sơn, Yên Luật, Lang Sơn, Chính Công, Yên Kỳ, Mai Tùng, Liên Phương, Hà Lương, Hương Xạ, Vụ Cầu, Minh Hạc, Vĩnh Chân, Phụ Khánh, Đan Thượng, Minh Côi, Văn Lang, Vô Tranh, Bằng Giã, Chuế Lưu, Xuân Áng, Lâm Lợi, Quân Khê, Hiền Lương and Động Lâm.
