= Thượng Long =

Rural commune in Phú Thọ, Vietnam

- Rural commune
- Location within Vietnam
- Coordinates: 21°21′22″N 105°00′36″E
- Country: Vietnam
- Province: Phú Thọ

Area
  - Total: 6.93 km^{2} (2.68 sq mi)
- Elevation: 289 m (948 ft)

Population (2009)
  - Total: 1,340
  - Density: 193/km^{2} (501/sq mi)
- Time zone: UTC+7 (ICT)
- Administrative code: 08317

Thượng Long is a rural commune in Phú Thọ, Vietnam. In 2009, it had a population of 1,340.

On June 16, 2025, the Standing Committee of the National Assembly issued Resolution No. 1680/NQ-UBTVQH15 on the reorganization of commune-level administrative units in Phú Thọ Province in 2025. Accordingly, Phúc Khánh Commune, Nga Hoàng Commune, and Thượng Long Commune were merged to form a new commune named Thượng Long Commune.
