= Kim Bảng, Nghệ An =

Kim Bảng
- Commune
- Interactive map of Kim Bảng
- Coordinates: 18.711384428688437°N 105.34993845909665°E
- Country: Vietnam
- Region: North Central Coast
- Province: Nghệ An

Area
  - Total: 183.26 km^{2} (70.76 sq mi)

Population (2025)
  - Total: 27,936
  - Density: 152/km^{2} (390/sq mi)

Kim Bảng is a commune in Nghệ An province, Vietnam.

Kim Bảng Commune was established under Resolution No. 1678/NQ-UBTVQH15 of the Standing Committee of the National Assembly of Vietnam, issued on 16 June 2025. Under the resolution, the entire area and population of Thanh Hà, Thanh Thủy, and Kim Bảng communes, formerly part of Thanh Chương district, were merged to form a new commune named Kim Bảng.
