= Phùng Nguyên =

- Commune
- Interactive map of Phùng Nguyên
- Coordinates: 21.297642413890166°N 105.28119291224523°E
- Country: Vietnam
- Region: Northeast
- Province: Phú Thọ
- Established: 16 June 2025

Area
  - Total: 30.57 km^{2} (11.80 sq mi)

Population (2025)
  - Total: 41,046
  - Density: 1,342/km^{2} (3,480/sq mi)
- Website: phungnguyen.phutho.gov.vn

Phùng Nguyên is a commune in Phú Thọ province, Vietnam.

On 16 June 2025, the National Assembly of Vietnam adopted Resolution No. 203/2025/QH15 amending and supplementing several articles of the Constitution of Vietnam, which provided for the termination of district-level administrative units nationwide from 1 July 2025.

On the same date, the Standing Committee of the National Assembly of Vietnam issued Resolution No. 1676/NQ-UBTVQH15 on the arrangement of commune-level administrative units in Phú Thọ province in 2025. Under the resolution, the entire area and population of Tứ Xã, Sơn Vi, and Phùng Nguyên communes were merged to form a new commune named Phùng Nguyên.
