= Thanh Ba district =

Coordinates: 21.450°N 105.167°E

Thanh Ba district Huyện Thanh Ba
- Rural District
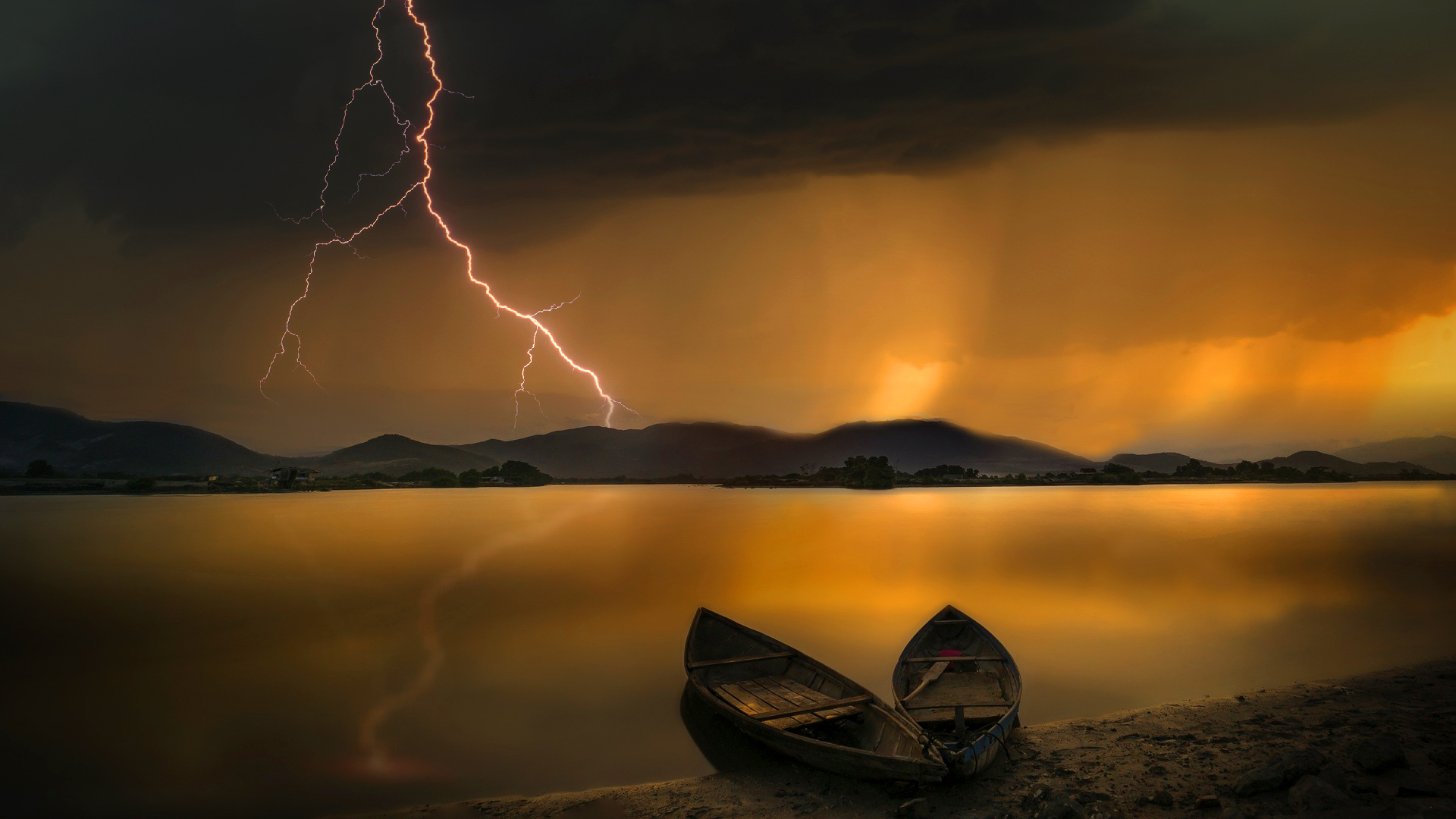
- Thanh Ba lake.
- Country: Vietnam
- Region: Northeast
- Province: Phú Thọ
- Central hall: No.3, Kình Hợp ward, Thanh Ba township

Area
  - Total: 194 km^{2} (75 sq mi)

Population (2003)
  - Total: 109,806
  - Density: 592/km^{2} (1,530/sq mi)
- Time zone: UTC+7 (Indochina Time)
- Website: Thanhba.Phutho.gov.vn

Thanh Ba is a former rural district (huyện) of Phú Thọ province in the Northeast region of Vietnam.

== Geography ==
As of 2003 the district had a population of 109,806. The district covers an area of 194 km^{2}. The district capital lies at Thanh Ba.

== Administrative divisions ==
The district consists of the district capital, Thanh Ba, and 26 communes: Đồng Xuân, Lương Lỗ, Hanh Cù, Yển Khê, Vũ Yển, Phương Lĩnh, Mạn Lạn, Hoàng Cương, Thanh Xá, Chí Tiên, Sơn Cương, Đỗ Sơn, Thanh Hà, Đông Thành, Khải Xuân, Võ Lao, Quảng Nạp, Ninh Dân, Yên Nội, Thái Ninh, Đông Lĩnh, Đại An, Năng Yên, Đỗ Xuyên, Thanh Vân and Vân Lĩnh.
