= Kim Bảng =

- Kim Bảng, Ninh Bình, a ward of Ninh Bình province
- Kim Bảng, Nghệ An, a commune of Nghệ An province
- Kim Bảng (town), a former district-level town of Hà Nam province
