= Việt Trì =

Việt Trì Phường Việt Trì
- Ward
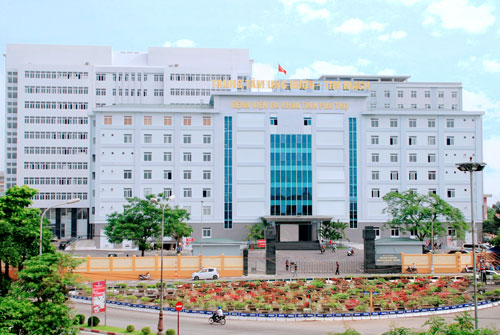
- Phú Thọ General Hospital
- Interactive map of Việt Trì
- Country: Vietnam
- Regions: Northeast
- Province: Phú Thọ Province
- Established: June 16, 2025

Area
  - Total: 25.83 km^{2} (9.97 sq mi)

Population (2025)
  - Total: 73,006
  - Density: 2,826/km^{2} (7,320/sq mi)
- Time zone: UTC+07:00 (Indochina Time)

Việt Trì is a ward (phường) of Phú Thọ Province, Vietnam. It is the capital of Phú Thọ Province.

== Geography ==
Việt Trì Ward located in central Phú Thọ Province, and adjacent to:

- Sông Lô Commune and Sơn Đông Commune to the north
- Hanoi City to the south
- Nông Trang Ward and Bản Nguyên Commune to the west
- Thanh Miếu Ward to the east.

== History ==
On June 12, 2025, the National Assembly of Vietnam issued Resolution No. 202/2025/QH15 on the arrangement of provincial-level administrative units (effective from June 12, 2025). Accordingly, the entire land area and population of Vĩnh Phúc Province, Hòa Bình Province and Phú Thọ Province were merged to form a new province named Phú Thọ Province.

On June 16, 2025, the Standing Committee of the National Assembly of Vietnam issued Resolution No. 1676/NQ-UBTVQH15 on the arrangement of commune-level administrative units of Phú Thọ Province in 2025 (effective from June 16, 2025). Accordingly, the entire land area and population of Tân Dân, Gia Cẩm, Minh Nông, Dữu Lâu Wards, and Trưng Vương Commune were merged to form a new ward named Việt Trì Ward.
