= Phú Khê =

Coordinates: 21.4044°N 105.1319°E

- Rural commune and village
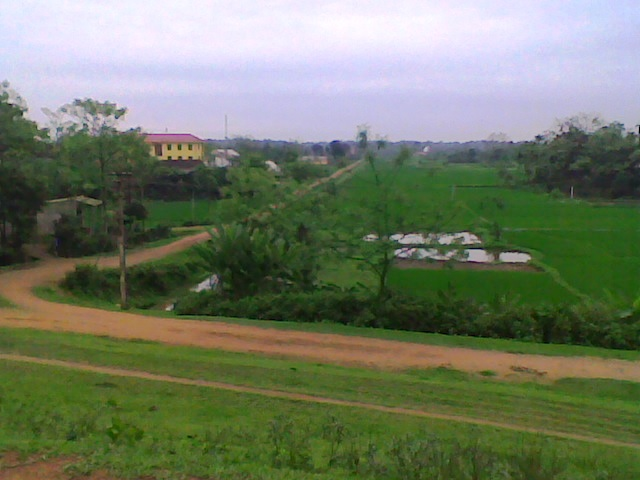

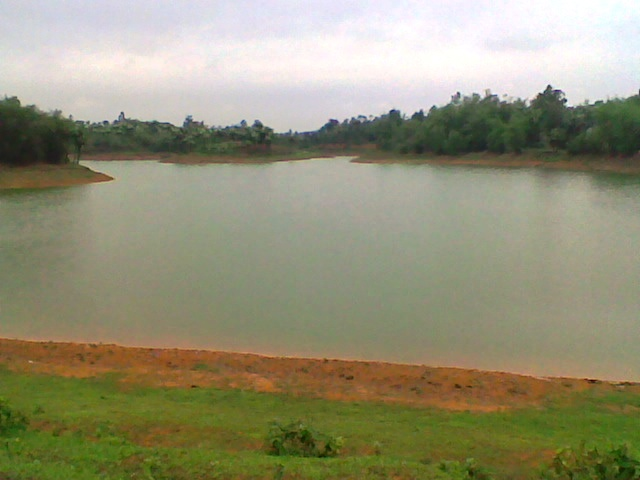
- Country: Vietnam
- Province: Phú Thọ

Phú Khê is a village and commune (xã) in Phú Thọ province, Vietnam. It lies in the Red River Delta. Given its water resources, the economy is based around fishing and aquaculture but also the production of timber and plant materials.

== History ==
Phu Khe has been around for a long time. The Me canal runs through Me. The waterway forms the boundary between Phu Khe and Yen Tap. In the dynastic area, the commune was also a district headquarters. After the August Revolution of 1945, Phu Khe commune was no longer the district seat.

The commune was struck by historic floods in 1969. After these floods, Phu Khe was expanded by the incorporation of the villages of Phu Dong, located on an island in the Red River formerly of Son Cuong commune and Thanh Ba district. The residents of the flooded island were relocated to Phu Khe.

On November 23, 1995, part of Phu Khe was redistributed to Song Thao.

Since 2025, the new Phú Khê commune was formed by merging the entire Hương Lúng commune with the old Phú Khê commune.

== Geography ==
Phu Khe is a mountainous area, but contains forests and plains suitable for farming. It is located in the centre of Cam Khe district, bordering the Red River to the east, bordering Song Thao to the north, Yen Tap to the south, and Son Tinh and Ta Xa communes to the west. Hills make up more than half the area of Phu Khe, and it also has many palm plantations, the most in the region. As part of the delta floodplains in Cam Khe, Phu Khe's plains are not continuous and are divided by hills, mounds, and river branches. There are also several lakes and small bodies of water in the area.

== Economy ==
Up until the 1960s, the annual monsoon brought flooding and fish into the area. When the water receded, it left fertile farms, lakes, lagoons with shrimp and fish stuck in the body of water. This yields much agricultural production as well as a source of abundant natural fisheries. Today, the system of dykes prevent flooding; this has increased rice production but aquaculture now needs to be done systematically by humans. However, the terrain and ponds that have formed are conducive to the fishery industry.

With the planting of 2 million palm trees per year in the 1970s, Phu Khe is most prolific location in northern Vietnam for the palm industry. The palm industry has declined, but the forestry industry has increased with timber plantations for producing lumber and paper. If an effective forest conservation plan is put in place, the area could be exploited for both forest products and ecotourism side by side.

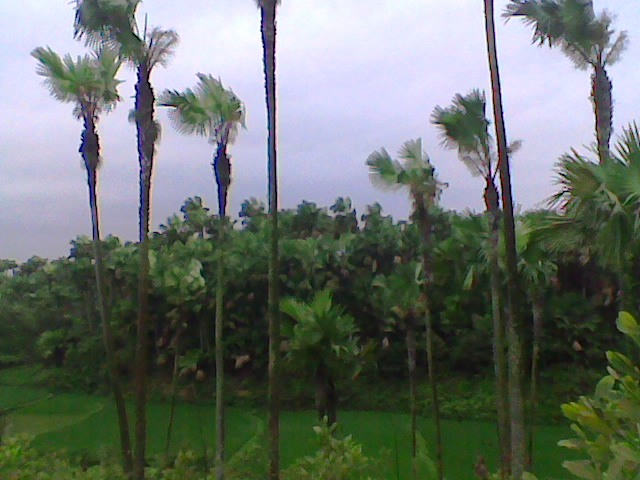

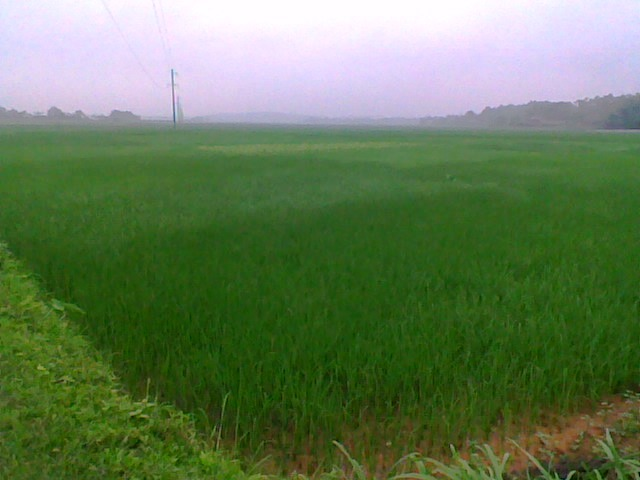

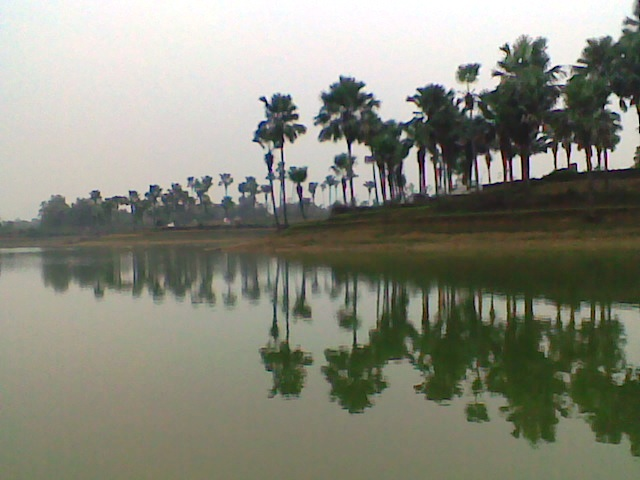

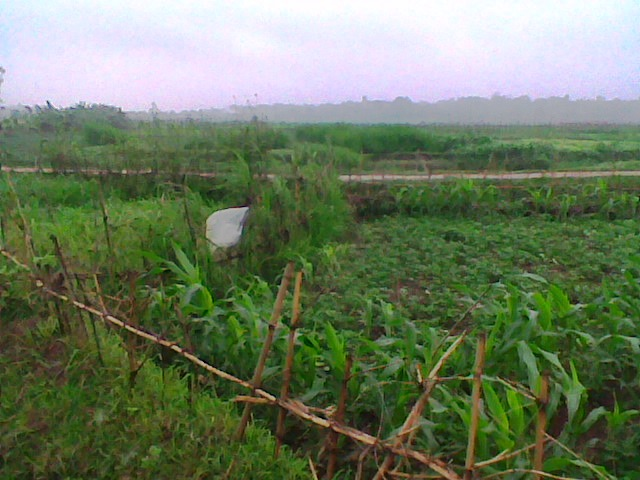
