= Thanh Chương district =

Coordinates: 18.750°N 105.167°E

Thanh Chương district Huyện Thanh Chương
- Rural District
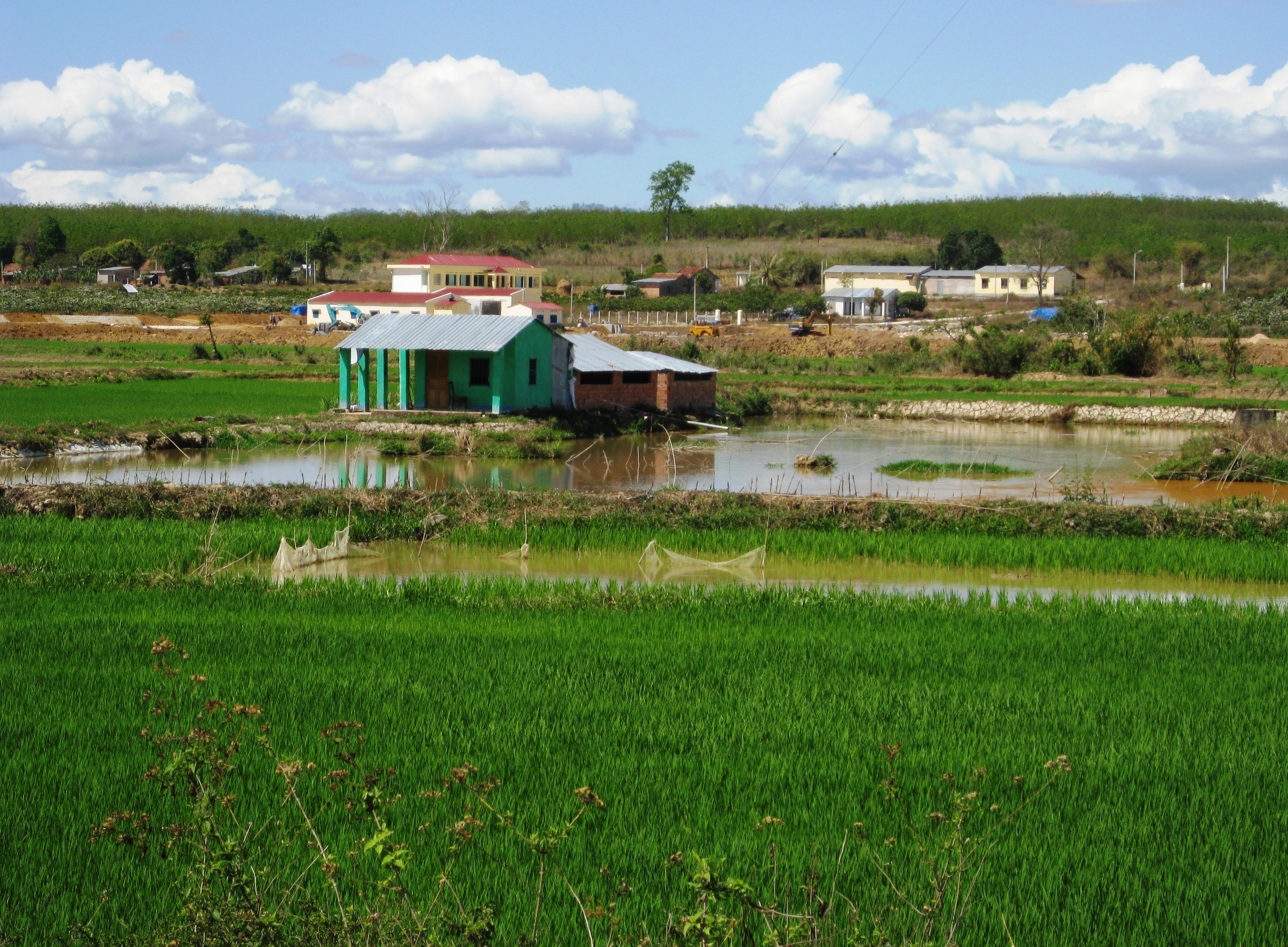
- A wet rice field in Thanh Chương.
- Interactive map of Thanh Chương district
- Country: Vietnam
- Region: North Central Coast
- Province: Nghệ An
- Central hall: Thanh Chương township

Area
  - Total: 1.128 km^{2} (0.436 sq mi)

Population (2018)
  - Total: 271,560
- Time zone: UTC+07:00 (Indochina Time)

Thanh Chương is a rural district of Nghệ An province in the North Central Coast region of Vietnam.

== History ==
As of 2018, the district had a population of 271,560. The district covers an area of 1,128 km^{2} (436 sq mi). The district capital lies at Thanh Chương.
