= Xuân Sơn National Park =

National park in Vietnam

- IUCN category II (national park)
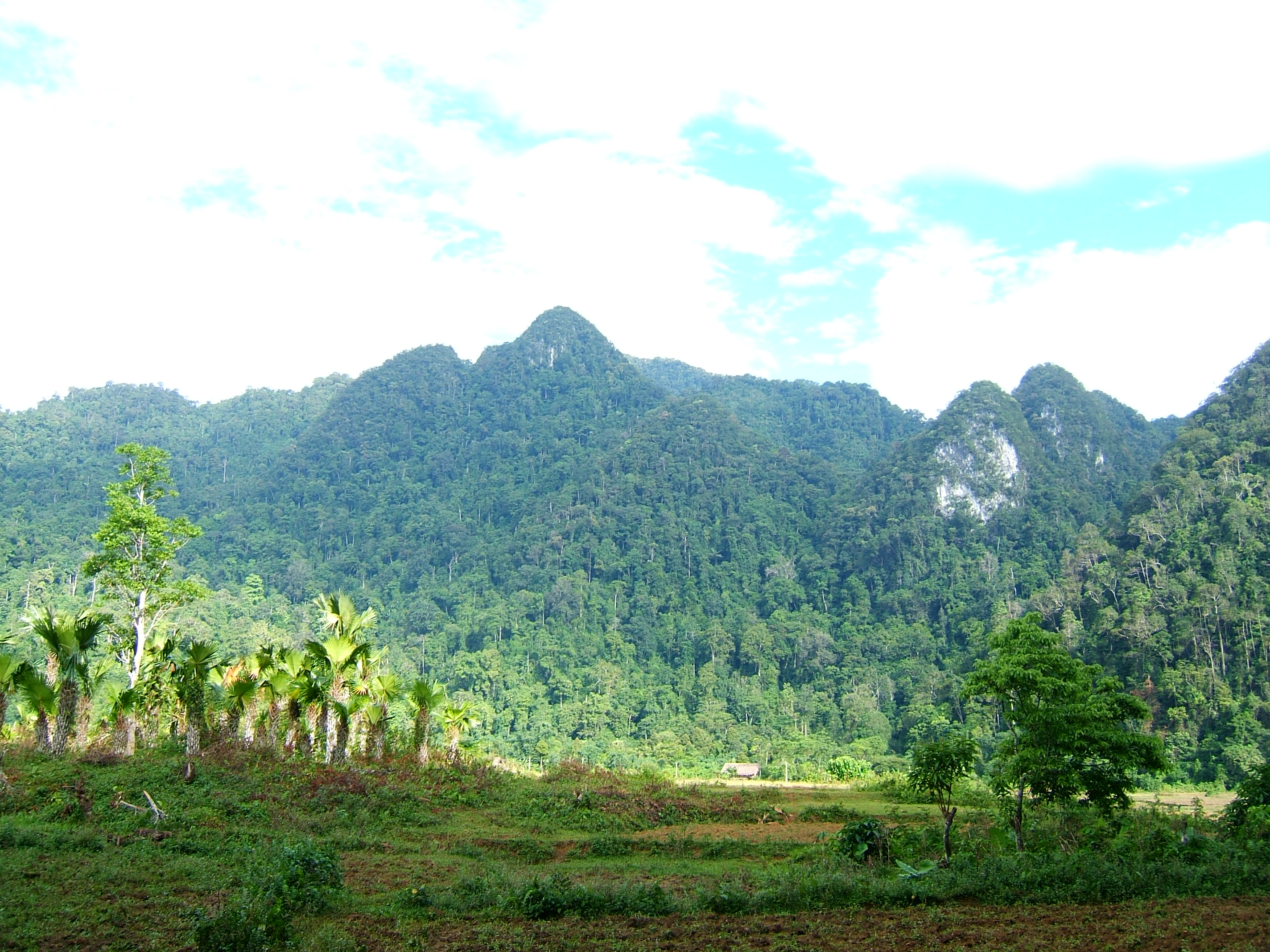

- Location within Vietnam
- Location: Phú Thọ Province, Vietnam
- Coordinates: 21°9′N 104°56′E
- Area: 150.48 km^{2} (58.10 sq mi)
- Established: August 9, 1986

Xuân Sơn National Park (Vietnamese: Vườn quốc gia Xuân Sơn) is a national park located in the communes of Xuân Đài and Lai Đồng, Phú Thọ Province, Vietnam. It was established on August 9, 1986 as a nature reserve, and it covers an area of 150.48 square kilometres.

The park lies at the extreme south-eastern extent of the Hoang Lien Mountains, 45 kilometres south-west of the confluence of the Red River and Black Rivers.

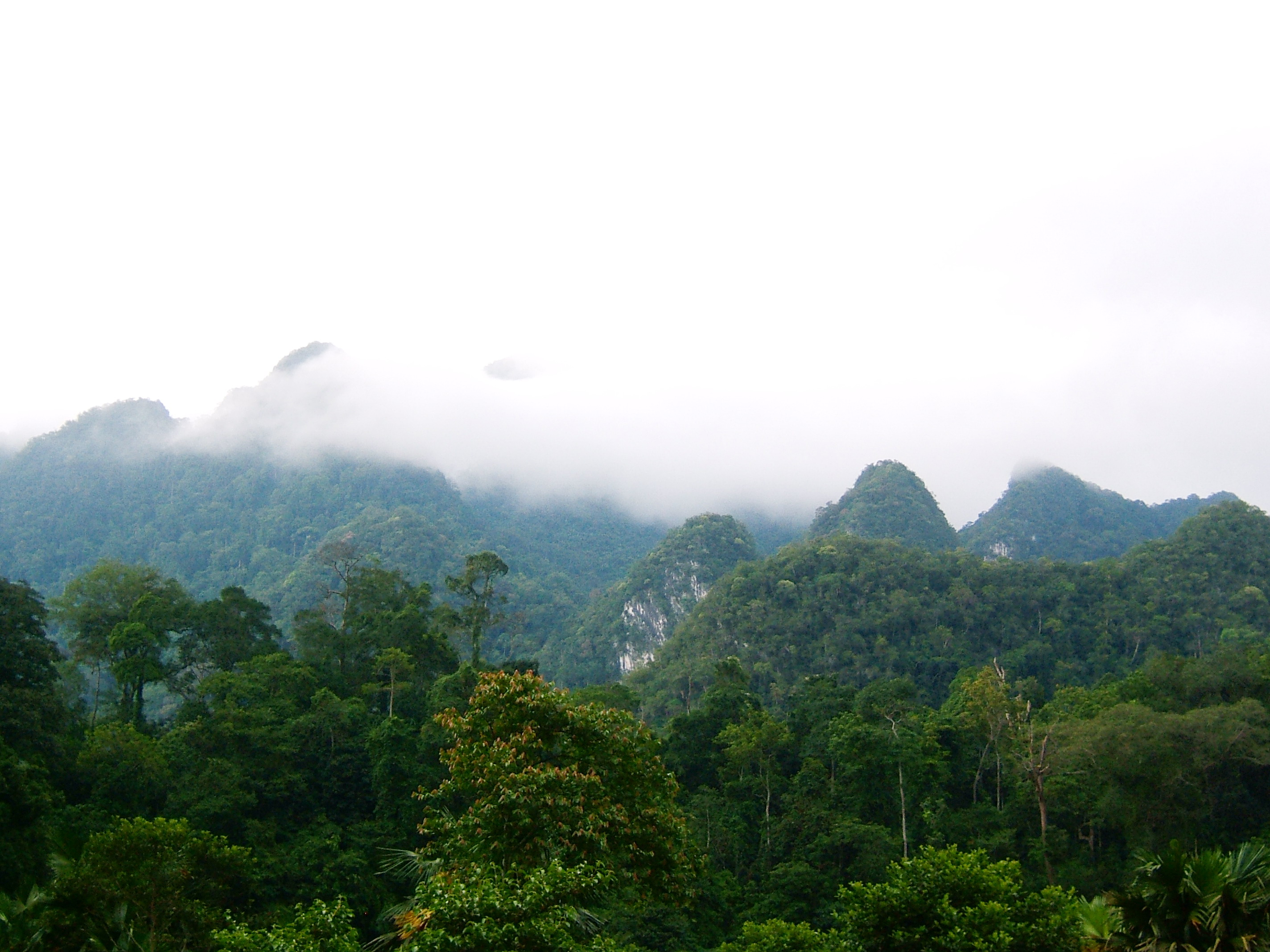
Xuân Sơn National Park
