= Phú Thọ province =

Province of Vietnam

Phú Thọ
- Province
- Tỉnh Phú Thọ 省富壽
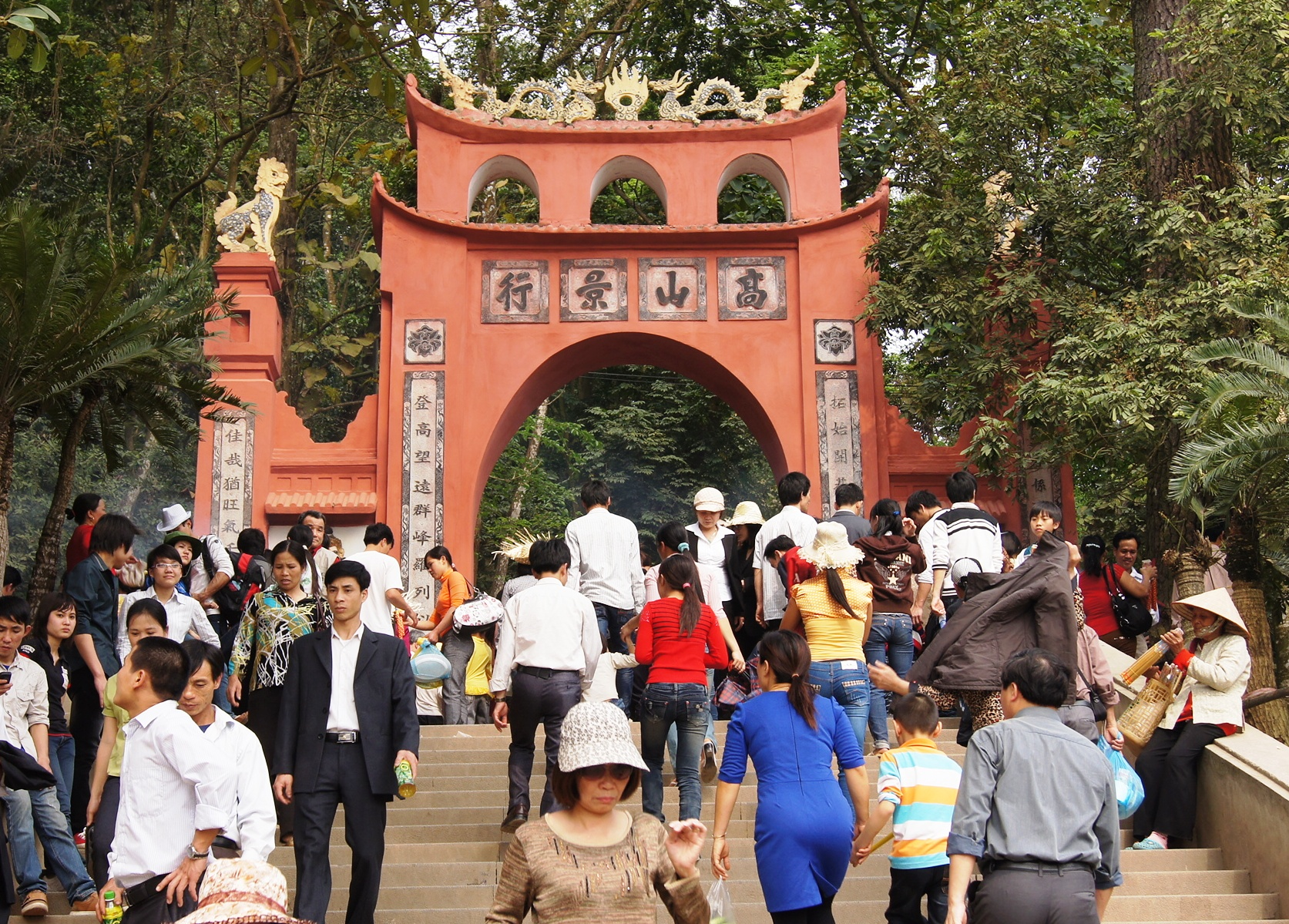
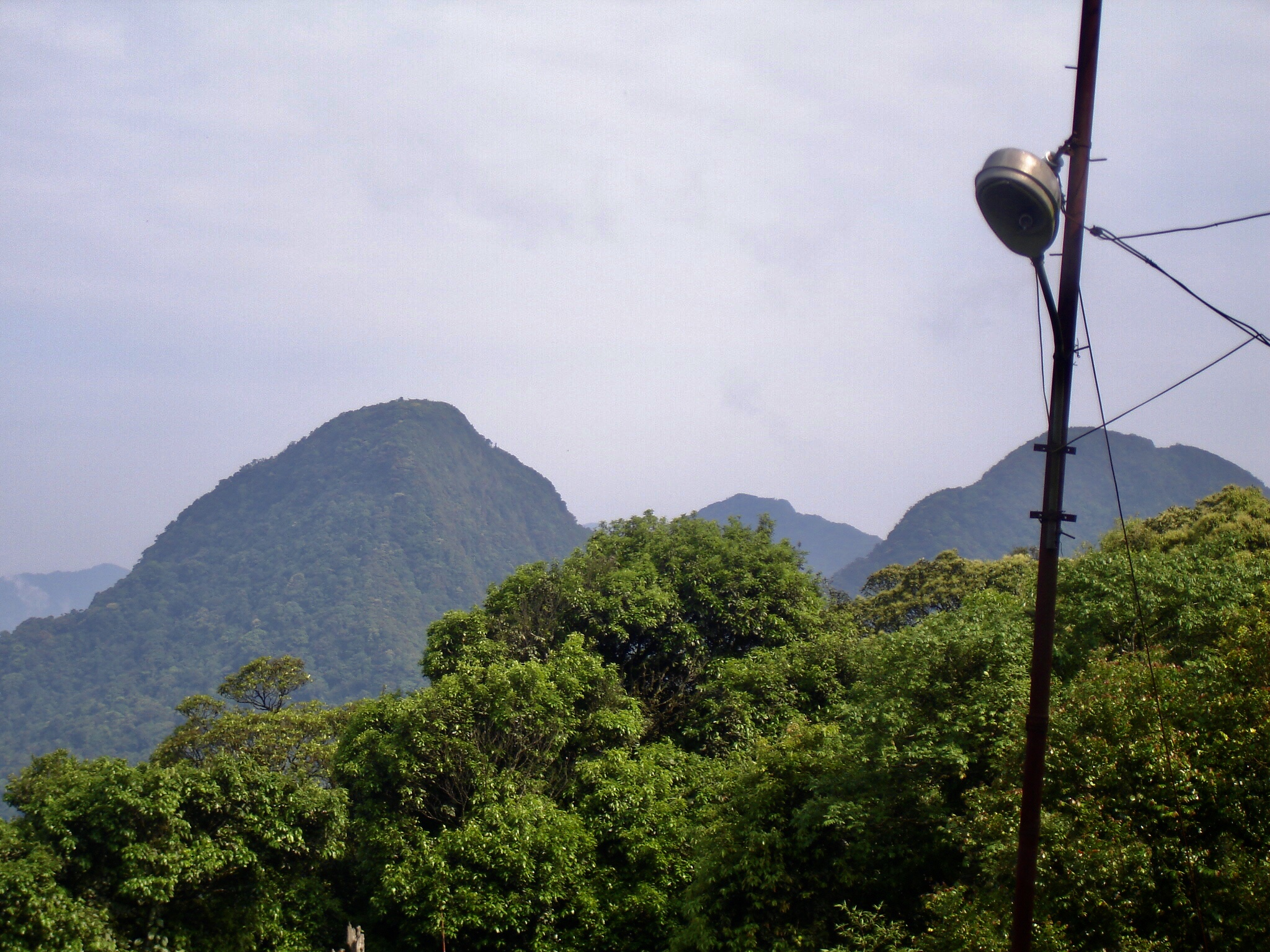
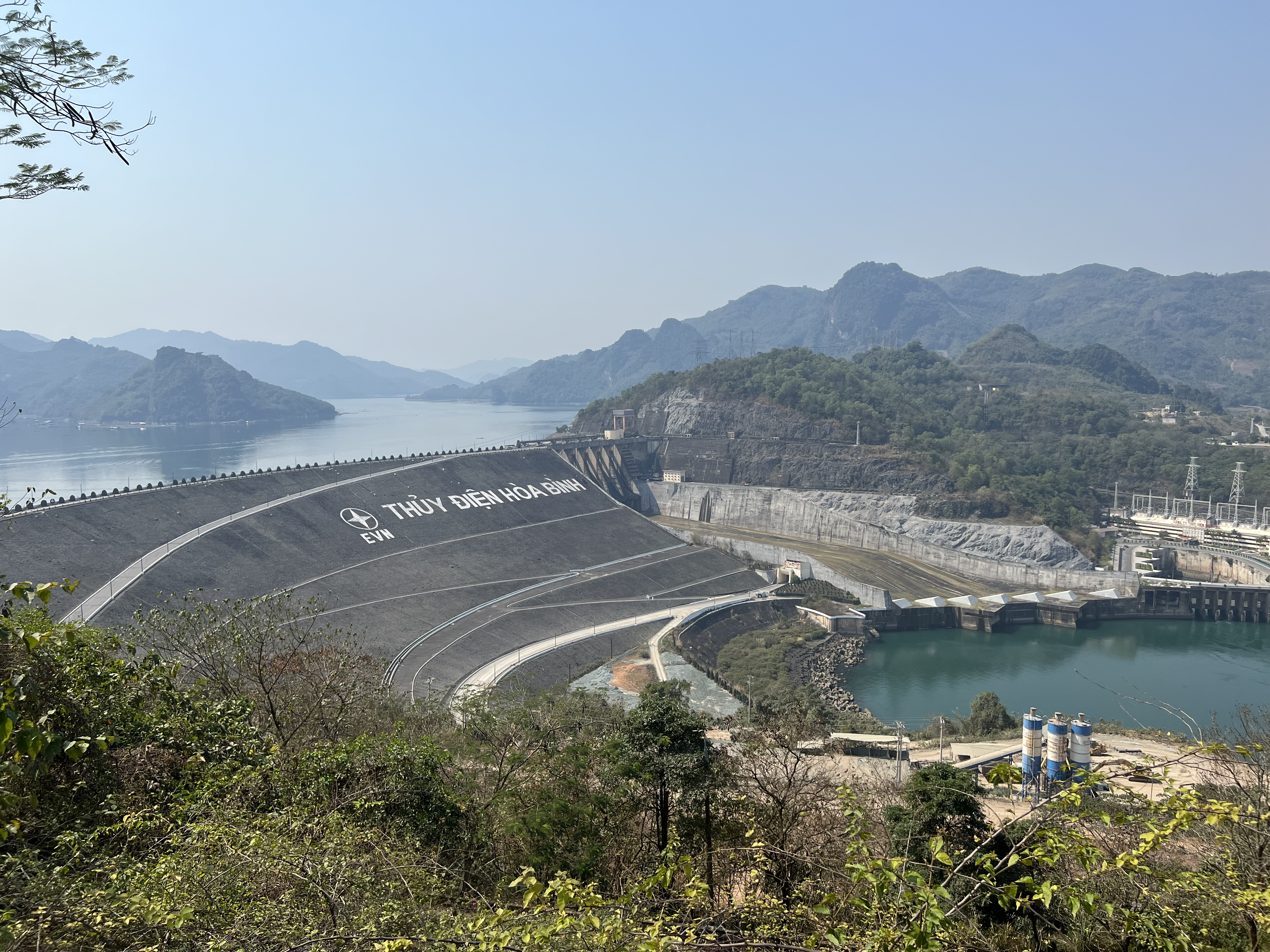
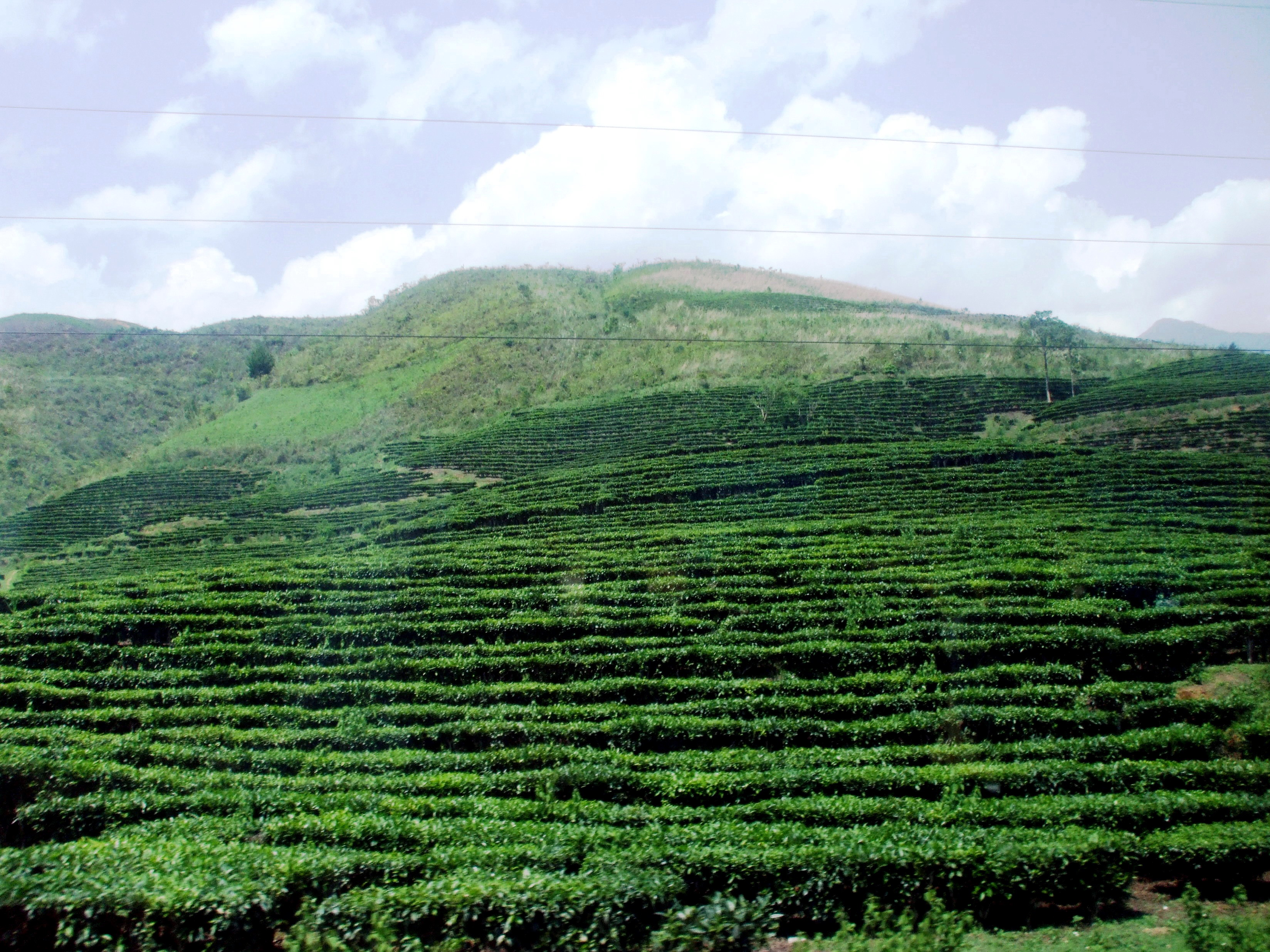
- Clockwise from top left: Entrance of the Hùng Temple; Peaks of Tam Đảo National Park; Long Cốc Tea Plantations; Hòa Bình Dam

- Seal

- Location of Phú Thọ within Vietnam
- Interactive map of Phú Thọ
- Coordinates: 21°20′N 105°10′E
- Country: Vietnam
- Region: Northeast
- Capital: Việt Trì ward
- Subdivision: 15 wards, 133 communes

Government
  - Type: Province
  - Body: Phú Thọ People's Council
  - Secretary of the Party: Bùi Minh Châu
  - Chairman of People's Council: Bùi Minh Châu
  - Chairman of People's Committee: Bùi Văn Quang

Area
  - Province: 9,361.38 km^{2} (3,614.45 sq mi)

Population (2025)
  - Province: 4,022,638
  - Density: 429.706/km^{2} (1,112.93/sq mi)
  - Urban: 1,280,000

Ethnic groups
  - Vietnamese: 82.95%
  - Mường: 14.92%
  - Dao: 1.07%
  - Others: 1.06%

GDP
  - Province: VND 57.353 trillion US$ 2.348 billion
- Time zone: UTC+7 (ICT)
- Area codes: 210
- ISO 3166 code: VN-68
- HDI (2020): ▲0.767 (8th)
- Website: www.phutho.gov.vn

Phú Thọ (Vietnamese pronunciation: [fǔ t̺ʰɔ̂ˀ]) is a province in northern Vietnam. Its administration center Việt Trì ward is located 80 kilometres (50 mi) from Hanoi and 50 kilometres (31 mi) from Nội Bài International Airport. The province covers an area of 9,631.38 km^{2} (3,718.70 mi^{2}) and, as of 2025, it had a population of 4,022,638.

== Geography ==
The area of the province is 9,361.38 square kilometres (3,614.45 mi^{2}), lying between 20°18 to 21°43 North latitude and 104°48 to 105°51 East longitude. Located in northern Vietnam, it is situated at the head of a triangular formation of the Red River Delta in the northern mountainous region. It is delimited by the provinces of Tuyên Quang and Lào Cai in the north, Sơn La in the west, Thanh Hóa and Ninh Bình to the south, and Hanoi and Thái Nguyên to the east. These provinces are connected to Hanoi, the capital of Vietnam. Phú Thọ province, due to its strategic location, is called the "West Gate of Hanoi". Its location is at the confluence of two rivers namely, the Red and Da Rivers; this province links the Red River delta with the country's mountainous provinces and the two Chinese provinces of Guangxi and Yunnan.

The Xuân Sơn National Park was established in February 2002. It is located approximately 80 km from Việt Trì Ward. The park covers an area of 15,048 hectares (37,180 acres), with more than 11,000 hectares (27,000 acres) of natural forests and 1,396 hectares (3,450 acres) of limestone-mountain forests. The park has some 465 species of upper plants and 282 species of fauna, including 23 species of amphibians, 30 species of reptiles, 168 species of birds and 61 species of mammals. Rarer species such as Tibetan bears, white pheasants, gray gibbons, and cobras are in the park. The highest points of the park are Mount Voi (1,387m), Mount Ten (1,244m) and Mount Cẩn (1,144m). There are grottoes and caves.

=== Climate ===
Phú Thọ is located in the subtropical monsoon region. It has recorded average temperature of 23.5 °C (74.3 °F); the highest temperature and the lowest temperatures recorded have been 29 °C (84 °F) (July) and 15 °C (59 °F) (February), respectively. The average rainfall varies between 1,600 millimetres (63 in) and 1,800 millimetres (71 in). Humidity is higher during the monsoon season from May to October with the annual average figure of 85%; in the dry season it goes below 80%. Precipitation is in the form of rainfall, most of it falling during the monsoon period. Most of the rain falls between April and September.

=== Water resources ===
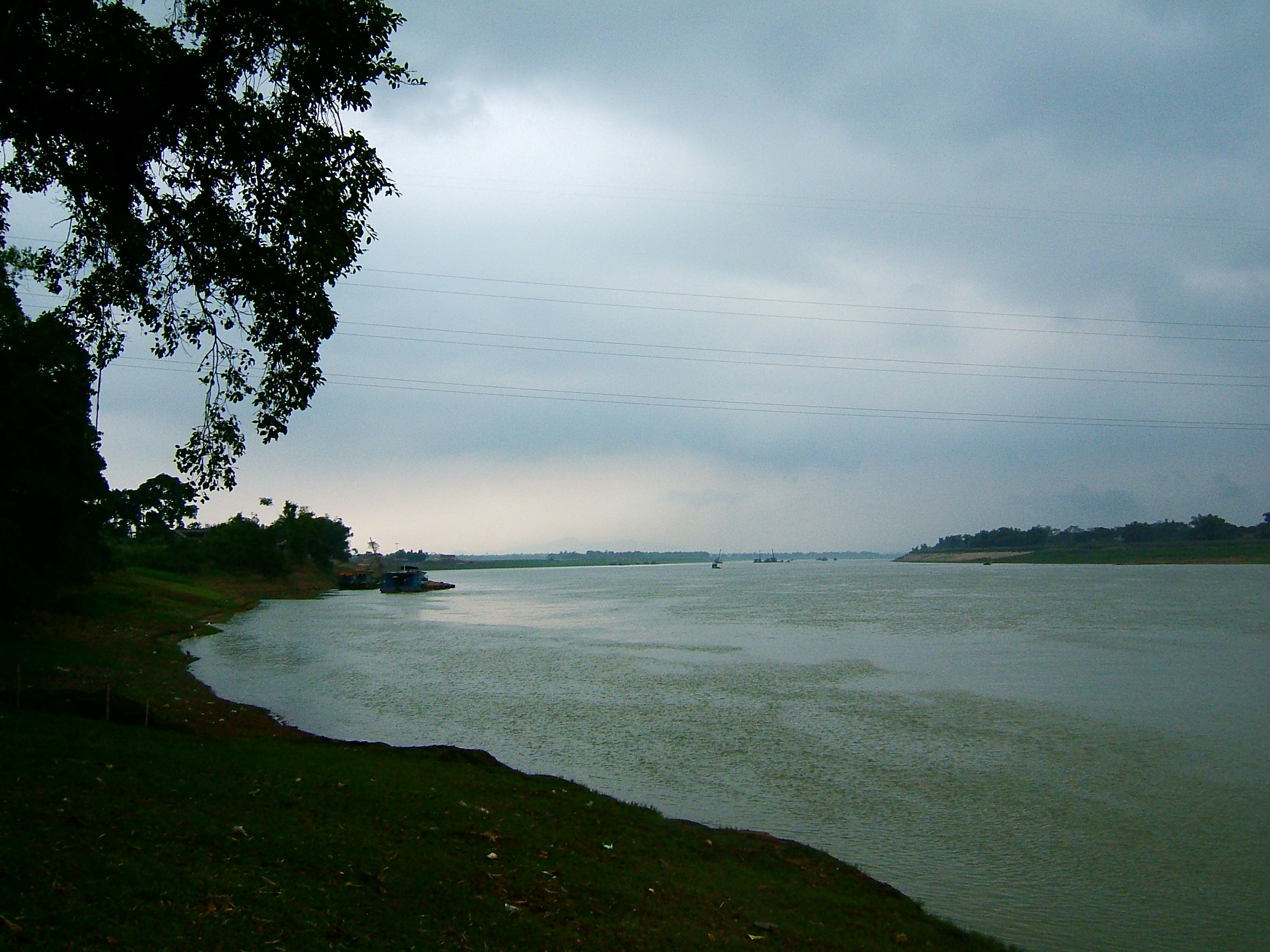
Lô River

Three rivers flow through the province: the Red, Lô and Da rivers, which ensure a source of water serving daily life and industrial purposes. The total length of these river systems is 200 km through the province and the area drained is 5,000 square kilometres (1,900 mi^{2}). The annual surface water resources in the province in its river systems has been assessed as 42,000,000,000 cubic meters.

=== Mineral resources ===
The mineral resources recorded in Phú Thọ province are kaolin, feldspar, spirit ores, stone and gravel sand for construction and mineral water.

== History ==
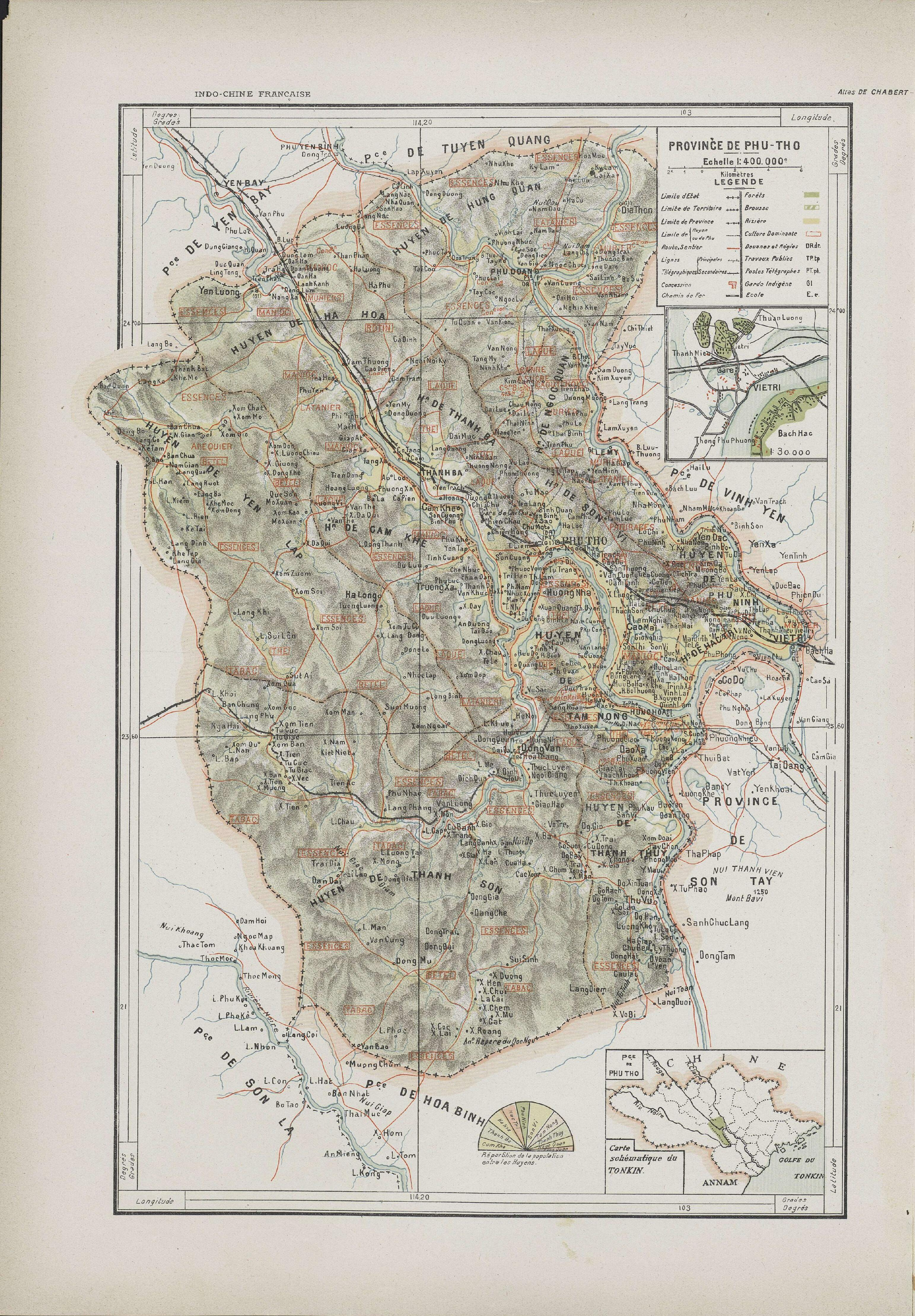
Map of Phu Tho province in 1909

In December 1999, Nguyễn Thị Thủy, the leader of an unregistered Protestant house church in the province, was sentenced to one year in prison for "interfering with an officer doing his duty", which caused some religious controversy in the province.

On 12 June 2025, the National Assembly issued Resolution No. 202/2025/QH15 on the arrangement of provincial-level administrative units (the resolution took effect on June 12, 2025). Accordingly, Hòa Bình Province and Vĩnh Phúc Province were merged into Phú Thọ Province.

== Demographics ==
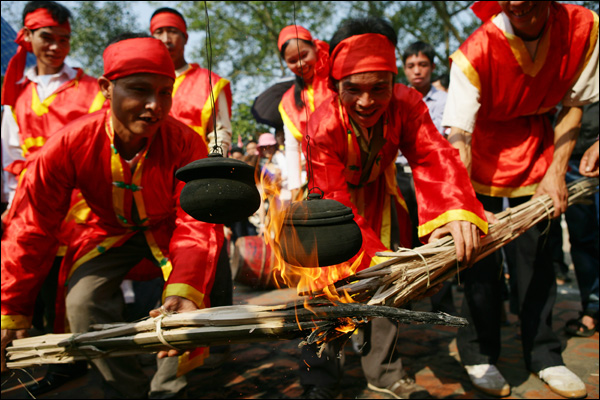
Men of Phú Thọ province

Ethnic Vietnamese (Kinh), Mường, Dao and Sán Chay are the dominant ethnic groups which live in the province. The Dao build their houses either on stilts, level with the ground or half on stilts and the other half beaten with earth. Du village, located within the Xuân Sơn National Park, contains a majority of this ethnic group is a tourist attraction.

== Economy ==
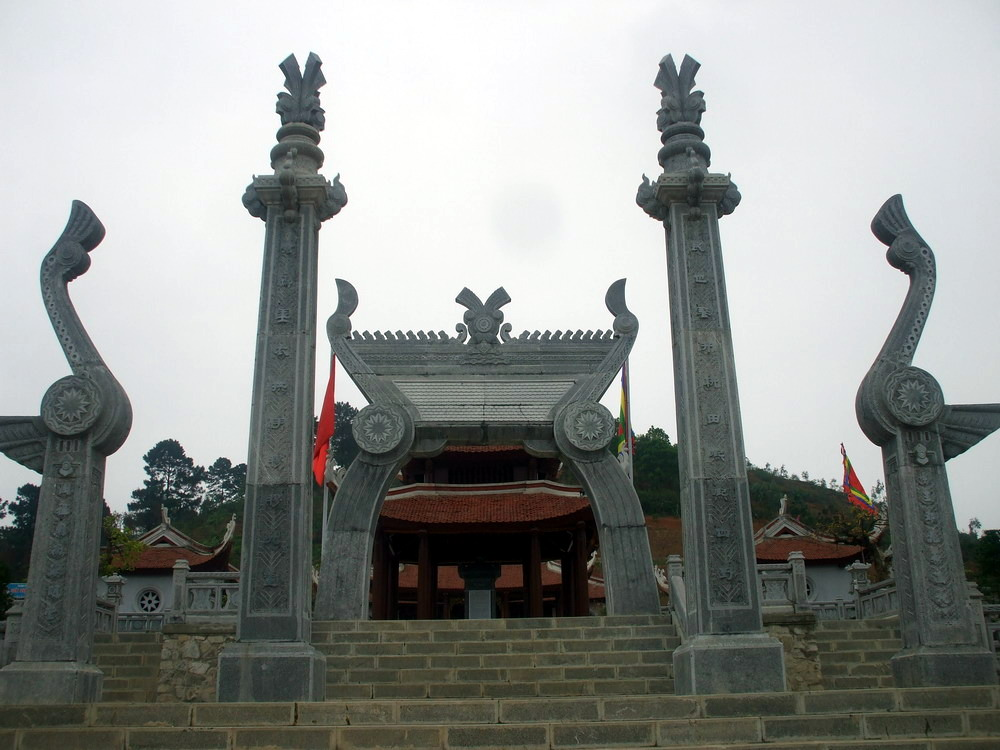
The former provincial capital of Việt Trì

The poorest households earn below $6 (USD) per person per month. As of 1997, the provincial economy was roughly evenly split at 33% of the workforce working in agriculture, industry and in services respectively. In the period during 1990–1995, the annual increase rate in income 72%. The city of Việt Trì (population 181,123 (2009)) is the headquarters of some companies and groups active in the province and contains some of the industrial firms and service industries.

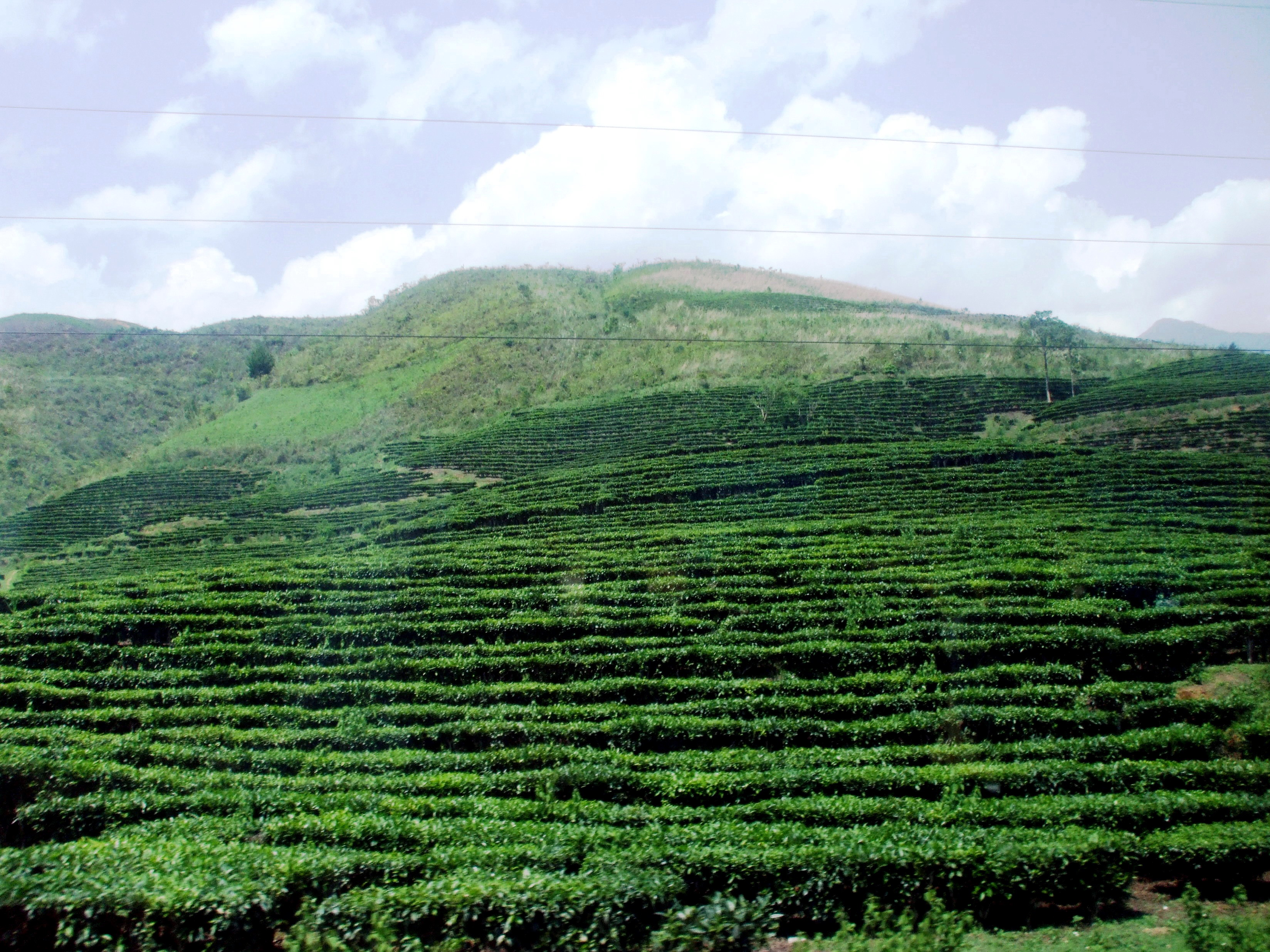
A tea hill in Phú Thọ

In agriculture, tea is the main industrial crop. In the 19th century, the tea industry was established in Vietnam, particularly in Phú Thọ province and three research stations were established to promote tea plantations 33,000 acres (13,000 ha). Until 1945, during World War II, the tea gardens were deserted, and post-World War II development of the tea industry restarted with assistance from other tea producing countries. The Vietnamese established a Tea Development Incorporation. The total planted area was estimated at 8,400 hectares (21,000 acres) in 2001, (7,200 hectares (18,000 acres) in 1997), around 9% of the cultivated area of the province. The province has an annual production of 31,000 tons of fresh tea (7,000 tonnes of dry tea), while between 1998 and 2001 there was an annual rise of 8% due to the increase in area and yield. As of 2002, the annual production was estimated at 100,000 tons of dry tea, tea consumption stood at 20,000 tonnes a year and 80,000 tons were exported. Over 15,000 families in the province are involved in tea production.

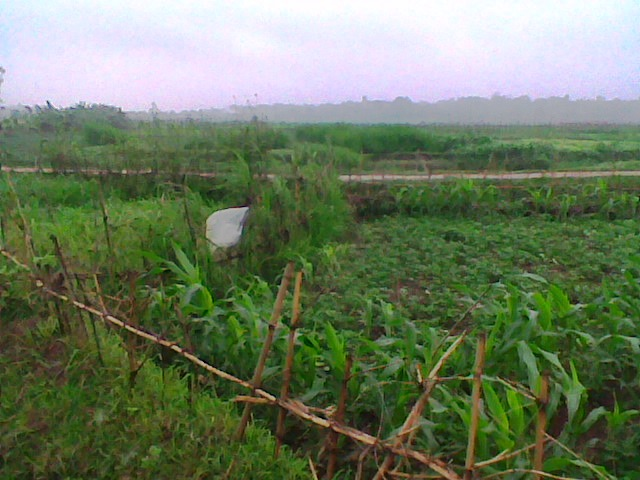
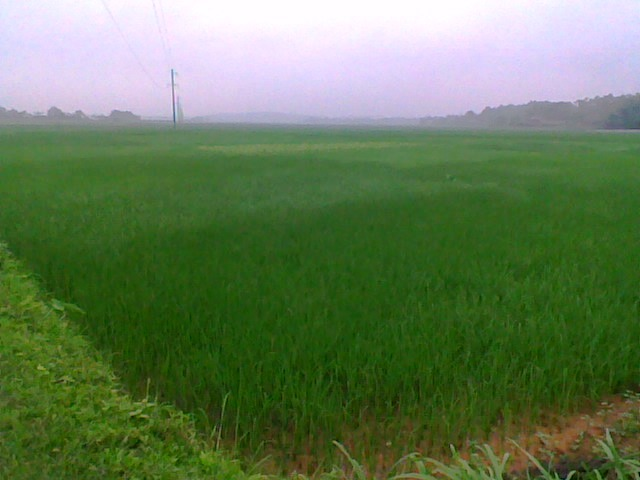
Agriculture in the commune of Phú Khê

The French agency Agence Française de Développement (AFD) are active in the province and have financed a tea production development program for villages in eight of the province's districts and aims contribute to the economic development of rural populations and improve their living conditions. Under AFD investment (8.5 million euro grant from France), some 3,000 hectares (7,400 acres) of new plantations will be created and existing plantations will be improved in yields and efficiency. 3000 families were expected to benefit from this project. The project has facilitated improvements in infrastructure in some 115 km of existing routes.

The Vietnamese government had a development strategy for the 2001–10, aiming to improve the output and income of the provincial economy, aiming to double its GDP, increase exports fourfold and strengthen the socialist market economy. Some of the relevant economics statistics related the agriculture and industries sectors are given below. As against the national figure of 273 Agriculture, Forestry and Fishery cooperatives there are 100 cooperatives, of which 96 are agricultural cooperatives and three are fisheries cooperatives. The number of cooperatives is 100 as against 7592 cooperatives in the country. There are 192 farms (last reported in 2002) as against the national number of 120,699.

The output value of agriculture produce at constant 1994 prices in the province was 1686.6 billion đồngs against the national value of 156,681.9 billion dongs. The province produced 280,300 tonnes of cereals as against the national production of 421.3 million tonnes.

The per capita production of cereals in the district was 308.7 kilograms (681 lb) as against the national figure of 501.8 kilograms (1,106 lb) in 2007. The province is also known for its grapefruit, palm oil, rice and cassava; freshwater fish are caught in the Red River. In 2007, the industrial output of the province was 11705.1 billion dongs against the national output of 1.47 million billion dongs.

== Education ==
Hung Vuong University, Continuous Education Centers of the province and at all districts, Transformatic and Language Center, and other colleges and vocational schools are the institutions which contribute to the educational standards of the province. They help in generating the required workers.

== Infrastructure ==
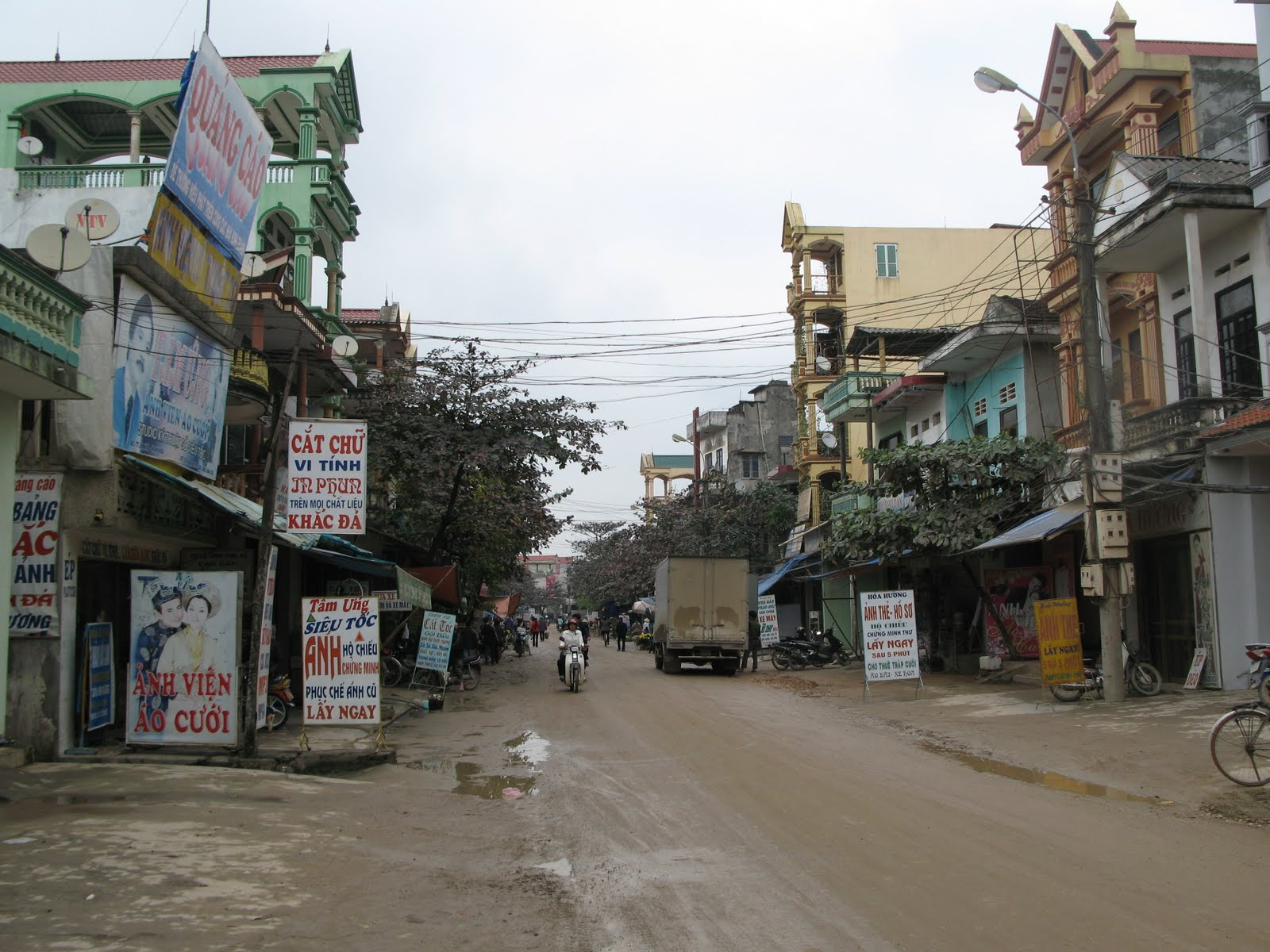
The town of Hạ Hòa commune

The province is connected by roads, rail, air and water transport systems that connect with other regions in Vietnam, which has facilitated its economic growth. A road system consist of the National Highway No. 2, Yunnan–Kunming express highway route that runs from China's Yunnan province through the Tuyên Quang and Phú Thọ provinces to Nội Bài International Airport; it continues as National Highway No. 5 to Haiphong and National Highway No. 18 links to the port of Cái Lân in Quảng Ninh. National Highway 32A, which runs from Hanoi traverses through Phú Thọ and terminates in Hòa Bình. National Highway 32C, also from Hanoi, passes through Phú Thọ to Yên Bài, eventually entering Laos. The Tran-Asian road and the Hồ Chí Minh trail also pass through the province. A Trans-Asia railway line runs from Yunnan to Hanoi and goes through Lào Cai and Phú Thọ provinces. This is connected with the Hanoi-Haiphong and Hanoi-Hồ Chí Minh City railways. The railway connects to the two industrial zones of Thủy Vân and Bạch Hạ. Việt Trì City is a river port. It is at the confluence of the three rivers that flow from China through this province. This waterway, as a water transport route in the province, has a total length of 235 kilometres (146 mi). Việt Trì's river port has an annual capacity of 1 million tonnes.

All of the local districts are connected to the national electricity network, which covers the entire province. Việt Trì City, capital of the province and its suburbs are provided with safe drinking water from a plant, which has a capacity of 42,000 m^{3}/day. The plant uses German technology. Postal and telecommunication utilities and services are established for domestic and international communication.
