= Qabiao language =

Kra language spoken in China and Vietnam

Qabiao
- Region: Hà Giang, Vietnam; Wenshan, Yunnan, China
- Ethnicity: Qabiao
- Native speakers: 710 (2009 census)
- Language family: Kra–Dai: Kra; Yang–Biao; Qabiao

Language codes
- ISO 639-3: laq
- Glottolog: qabi1235
- ELP: Laqua

Qabiao, Pu Peo or sometimes Laqua (autonym: qa0 biau33; Chinese: Pubiao 普标, Vietnamese: Pu Péo) is a Kra language spoken by the Qabiao people in northern Vietnam and Yunnan, China. Alternative names for Qabiao include Kabeo, Ka Beo, Ka Bao, Ka Biao, Laqua, Pubiao (Pupeo or Pu Péo) and Pen Ti Lolo (Bendi Lolo). The meaning of the name "Qabiao" is unknown.

Maza, a Lolo–Burmese language spoken near the Qabiao area, is notable for having a Qabiao substratum (Hsiu 2014:68-69).

== Geographic distribution ==
In Vietnam, Qabiao is spoken in Đồng Văn District, Hà Giang Province in Phố Là and Sủng Chéng villages, and perhaps also in Yên Minh and Mèo Vạc Districts.

Tran (2011:15) reports that Qabiao is spoken in the following locations of Ha Giang Province.

- Phố Là, Sùng Chéng, Phó Bảng, Phó Cáo, and Má Lé communes of Đồng Văn District
- Cháng Lổ and Sùng Chéng of Phú Lũng commune, Yên Minh District
- Tiến Xuân, Yen Cường commune, Bắc Mê District
- Mèo Vạc District

The Pu Péo (Qabiao) of Vietnam claim that they had traditionally lived in the following villages in Vietnam and China (Tran 2011:16).

- Đồng Văn District, Vietnam
  - Phó Bảng (Mó Biêng)
  - Phó Cáo (Mó Cao)
  - Phó Là (Mó Nê)
  - Phó Lủng (Mó Căn)
- Malipo County, China
  - Phú Trú (Mó Nương)
  - Phú Trác (Mó Căn)
  - Phú Pliông (Mó Phuông)
  - Phú Trao (Mó Rào)

In China, Qabiao is spoken in Tiechang Township 铁厂镇 and Donggan Township 懂干镇 in Malipo County, Wenshan Zhuang and Miao Autonomous Prefecture, Yunnan (Liang, et al. 2007). Many Qabiao people have shifted to Southwestern Mandarin, although it is still spoken in villages such as Pufeng 普峰.

== Phonology ==
The Qabiao language has the following tones: A1, A2, B1, B2, C1, C2, D1, D2.

Like Paha (J.-F. Li and Y.-X. Luo 2010: 16–17), Long-haired Lachi (Kosaka 2000: 20–24) and Buyang, Qabiao (J.-R. Zhang 1990) have sesquisyllables, which are not present in most Kra-Dai languages.

== Notes ==
- Hsiu, Andrew. 2014. "Mondzish: a new subgroup of Lolo-Burmese Archived 2016-03-03 at the Wayback Machine". In Proceedings of the 14th International Symposium on Chinese Languages and Linguistics (IsCLL-14). Taipei: Academia Sinica.
- Liang Min, Zhang Junru & Li Yunbing (2007). Pubiao yu yanjiu. Beijing: The Ethnic Publishing House.
