= Hà Giang province =

Former province of Vietnam

Hà Giang
- Province
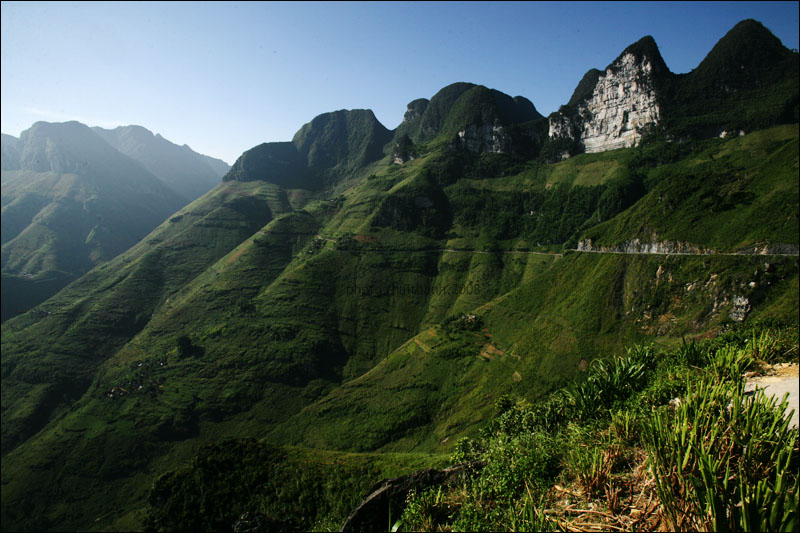
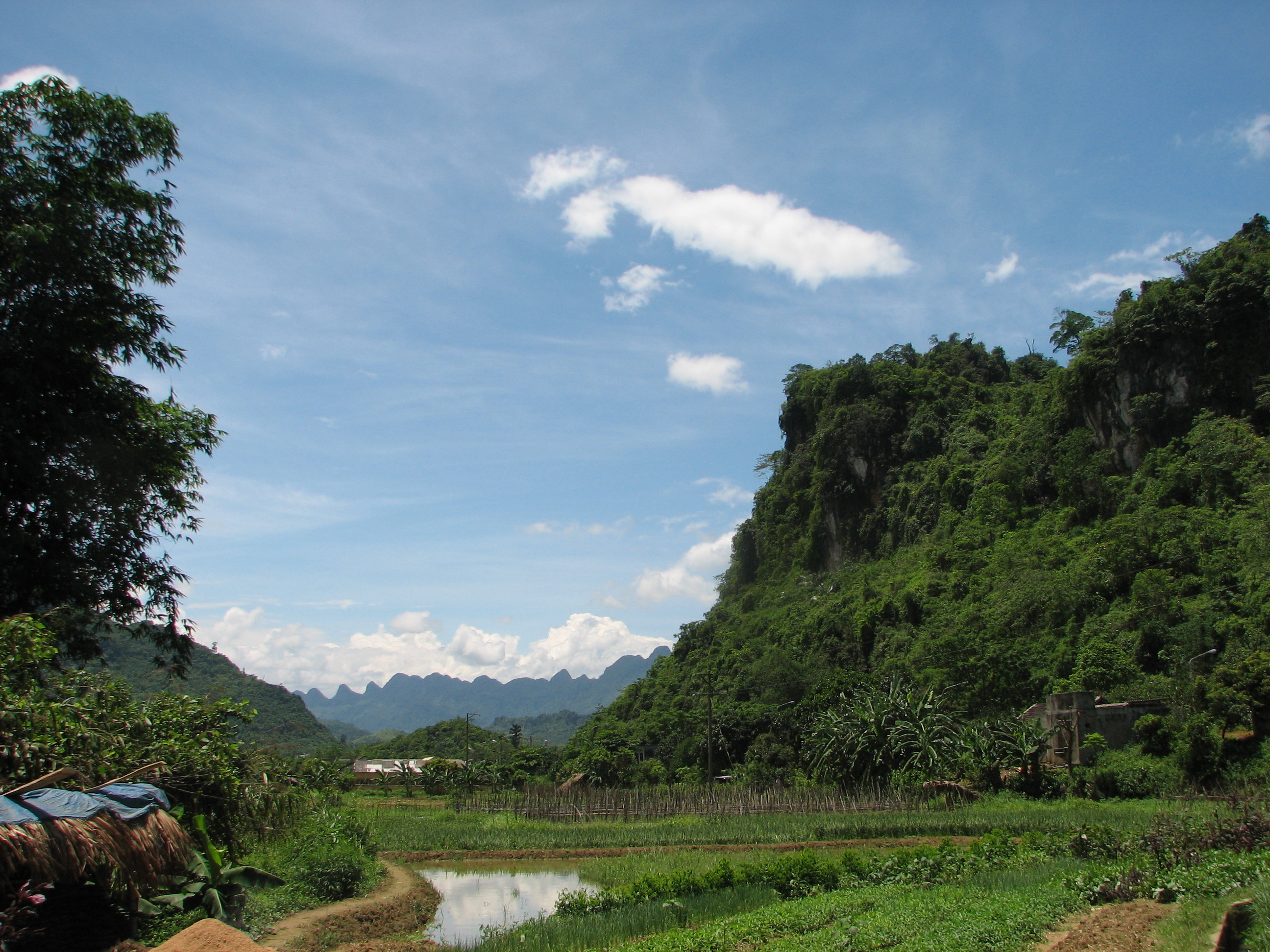
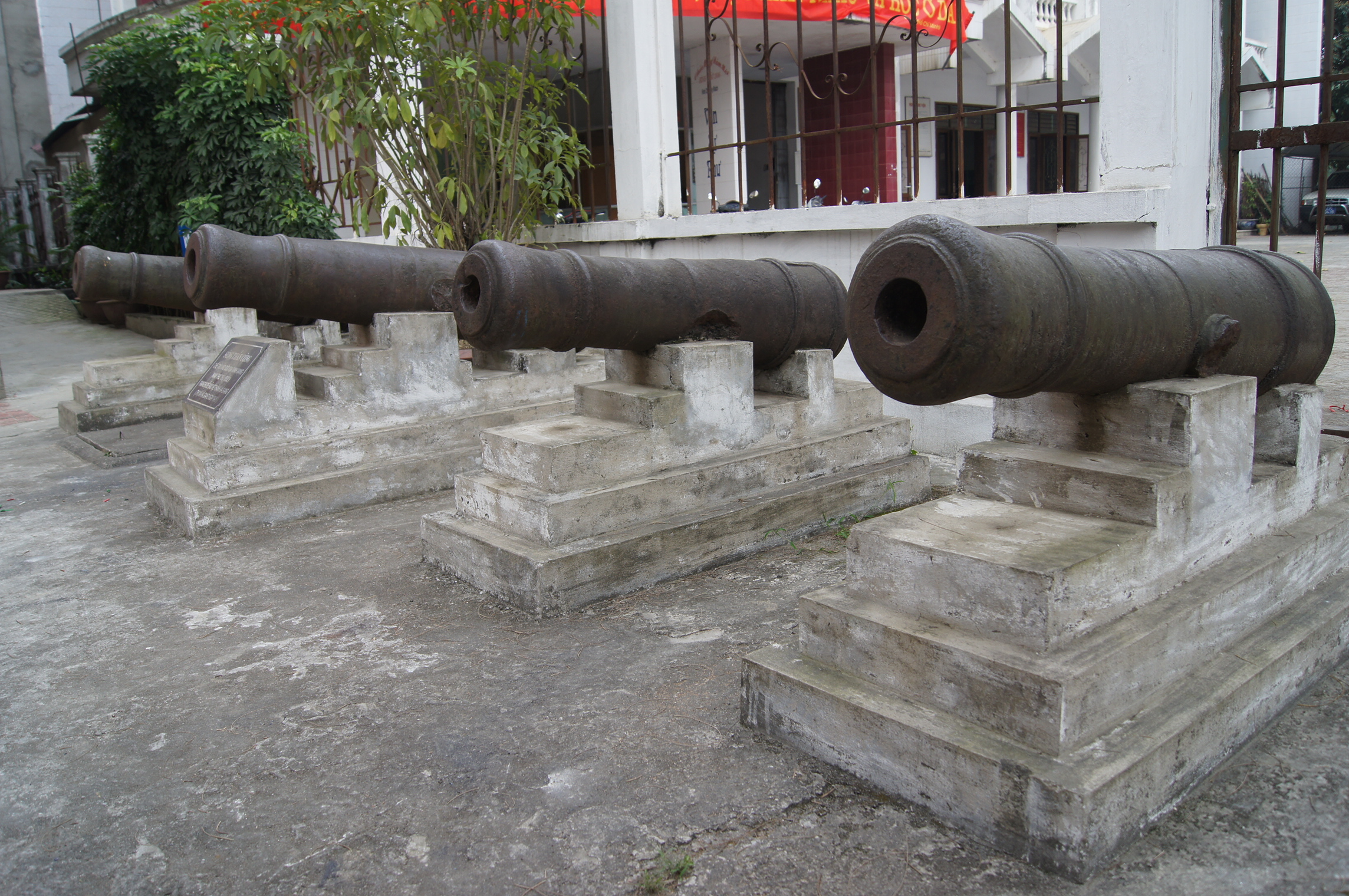
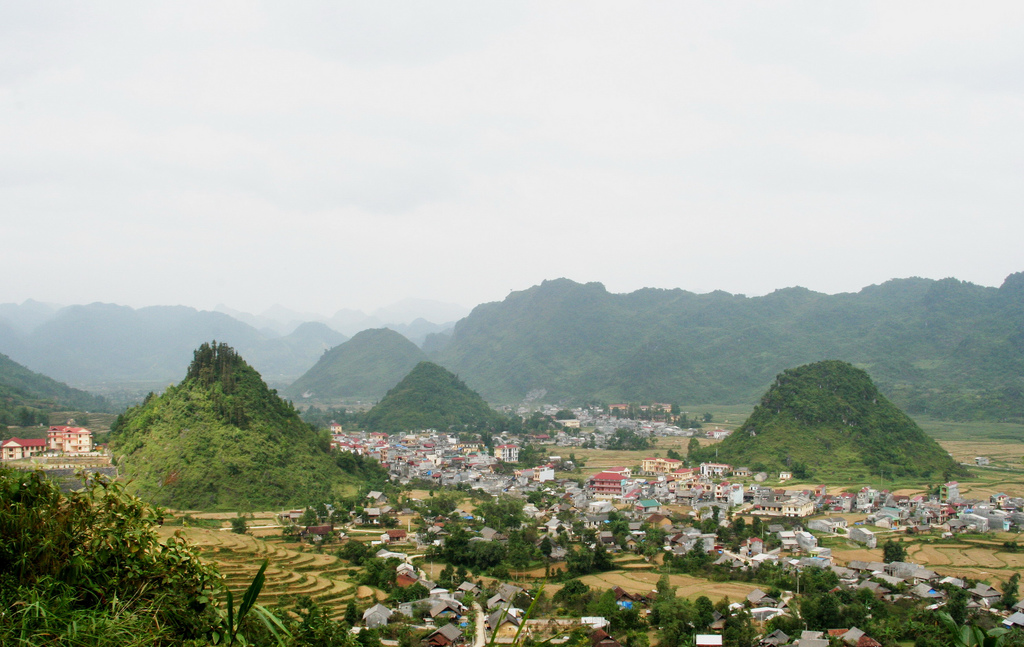
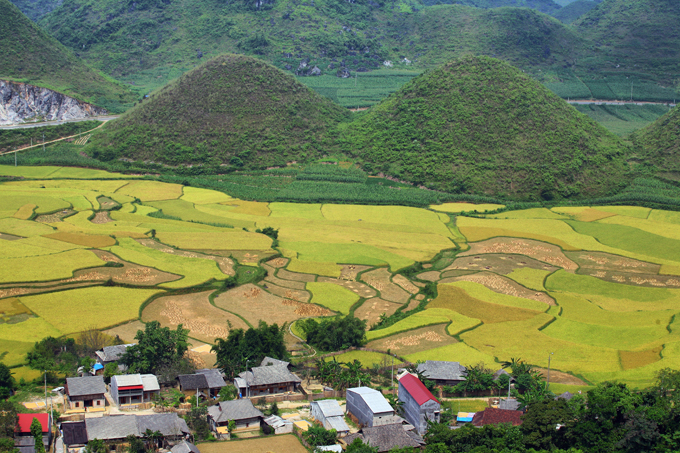
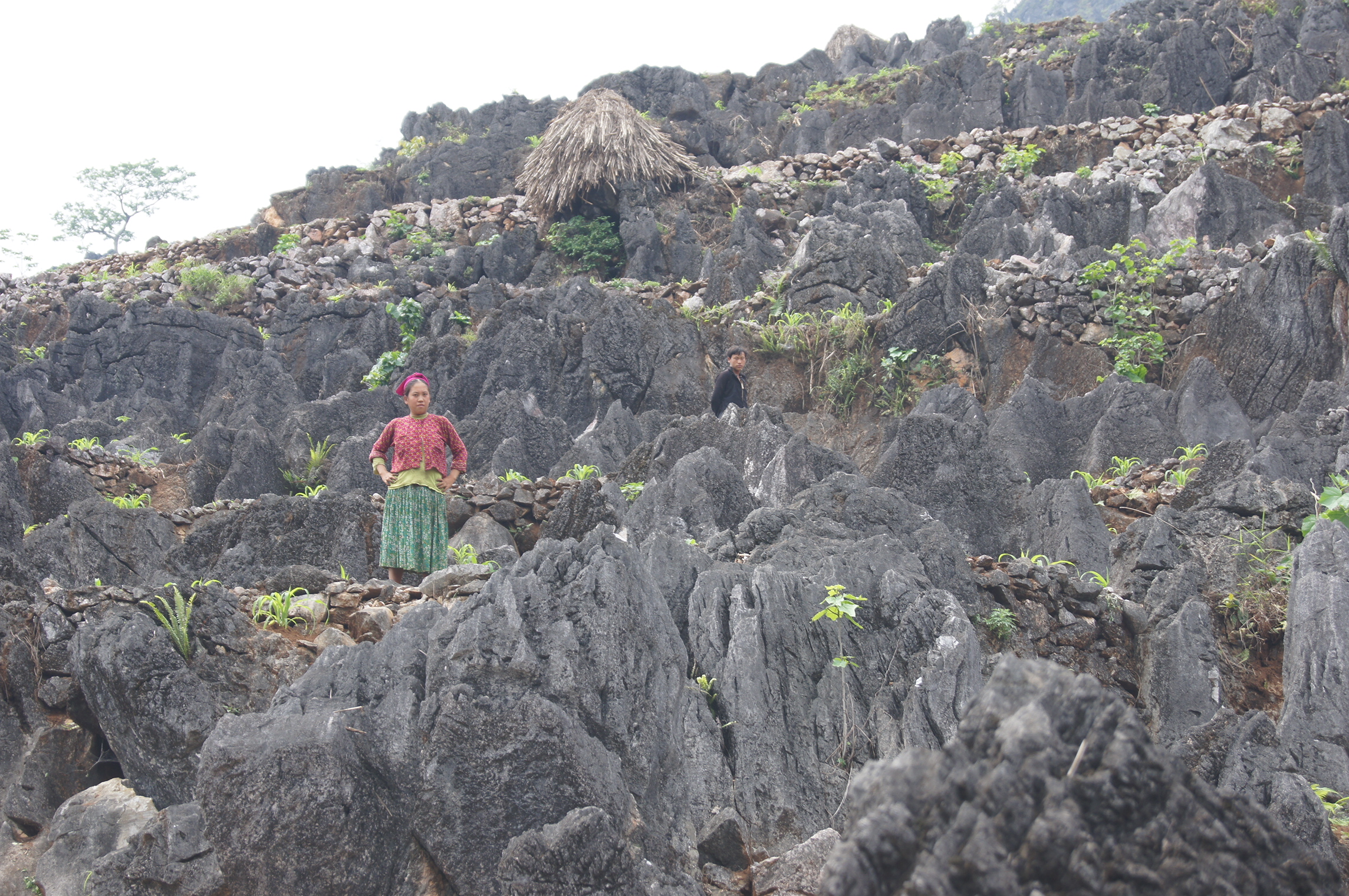
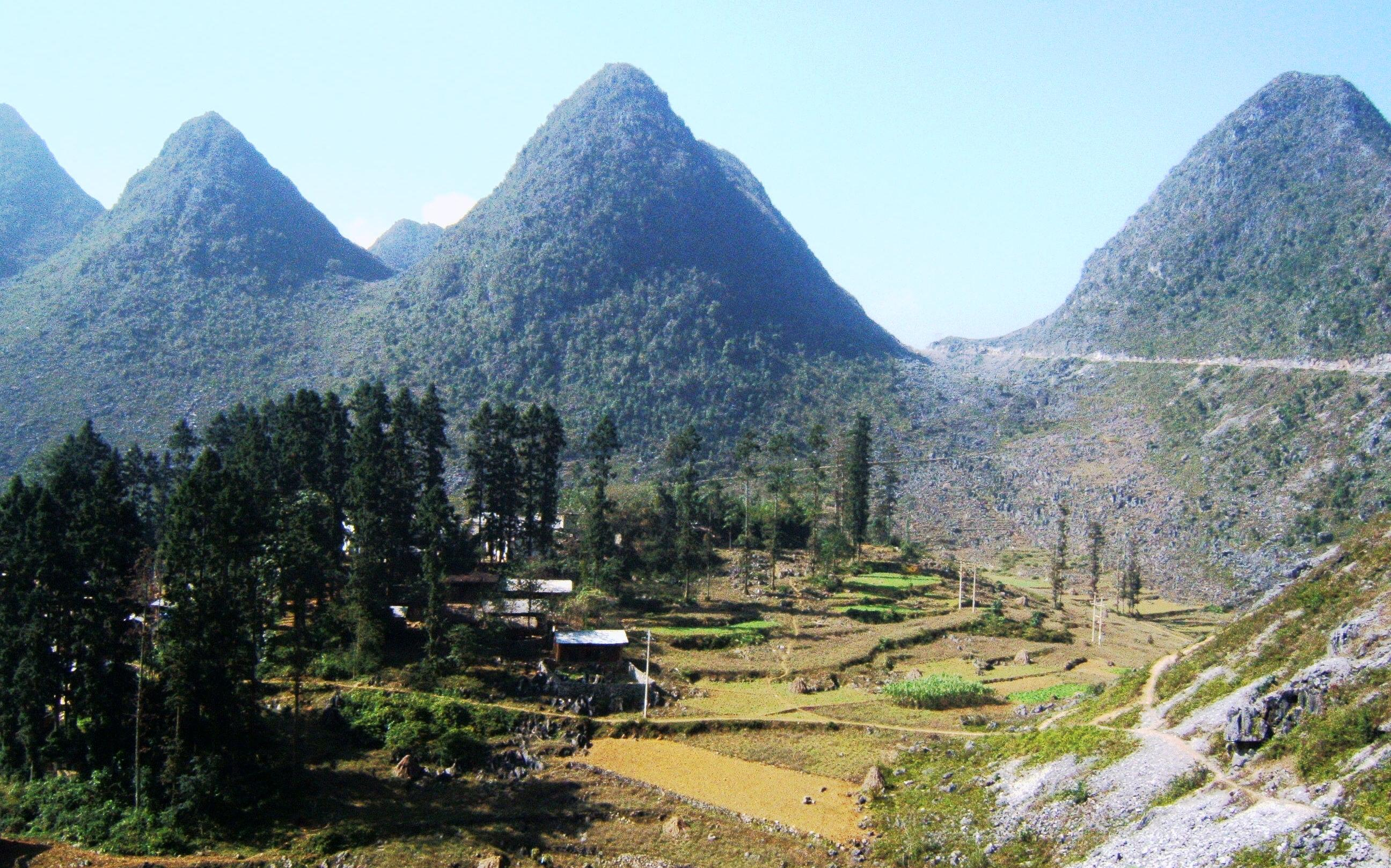
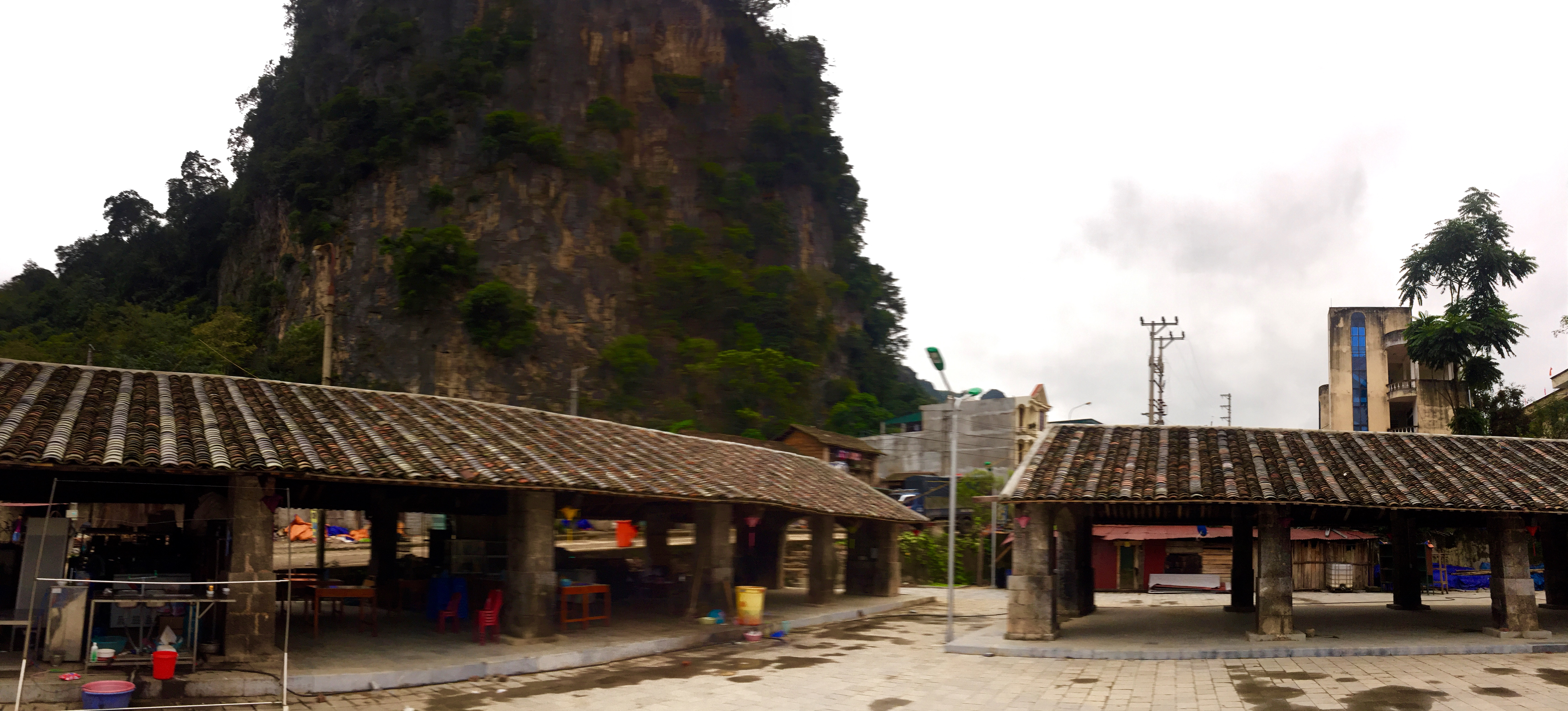
- Mã Pí Lèng Pass • Farm Nông - Lâm • Phat Tich Truc Lam Pagoda • Museum Hà Giang • Nam Dau Pagoda • Tam Sơn Mountain • Quản Bạ Mountain • Dong Van Karst Plateau Geopark • Mansion SaPhin • Đồng Văn Temple

- Seal

- Location of Hà Giang within Vietnam
- Coordinates: 22°45′N 105°0′E
- Country: Vietnam
- Region: Northeast
- Capital: Hà Giang
- Subdivision: 1 city, 10 rural districts

Government
  - Type: Province
  - Body: Hà Giang Provincial People's Council
  - Chairman of People's Council: Thào Hồng Sơn
  - Chairman of People's Committee: Nguyễn Văn Sơn

Area
  - Total: 7,927.55 km^{2} (3,060.84 sq mi)

Population (2025)
  - Total: 944,083
  - Density: 119.089/km^{2} (308.439/sq mi)

Ethnic groups
  - Mông: 34.25%
  - Tày: 22.55%
  - Dao: 14.88%
  - Vietnamese: 12.32%
  - Nùng: 9.53%
  - Giáy: 2.03%
  - La Chí: 1.62%
  - Others: 2.82%

GDP
  - Province: VND 20.772 trillion US$ 0.761 billion
- Time zone: UTC+07:00 (ICT)
- Postal code: 20xxx
- Area codes: 219
- ISO 3166 code: VN-03
- HDI (2020): ▲0.603 (62th)
- Website: www.hagiang.gov.vn

Hà Giang (Vietnamese pronunciation: [haː2 zaːŋ1],) was a province in the Northeast region of Vietnam. It was located in the far north of the country, and contains Vietnam's northernmost point. It shared a 270 km long border with Yunnan province of southern China, and thus was known as Vietnam's final frontier. It covered an area of 7,927.55 km^{2} (3,060.84 mi^{2}), comprising 1 city and 10 rural districts, with a population of 899,900 in 2023.

The provincial capital, also called Hà Giang, was connected by Highway 2 and is 320 km away from Hanoi. The border crossing was at Thanh Thủy, 25 km from the provincial capital. It was one of the poorest provinces of Vietnam as it had mountainous topography with the least potential for agricultural development.

In addition to Thanh Thủy, there were three smaller gates, namely the Phó Bảng, Xín Mần and Săm Pun.

On 12 June 2025, Hà Giang province was incorporated into Tuyên Quang province.

== Geography ==
Hà Giang is bordered by Cao Bằng, Tuyên Quang, Lào Cai, and Yên Bái provinces and has a common international border with China in the north. Hà Giang has many high rocky mountains, limestone formations and springs; the important mountains are the Cam and Mỏ Neo. The major rivers of the region are the Lô River (Hà Giang city is located on its left bank) and Miện River.

The topography of the province of Hà Giang is fairly complex: "temperate, but highly localized montane weather patterns create variable conditions among different regions". It has impressive limestone and granite peaks and outcrops. It has three regions. Climatically, it has two seasons, dry and monsoon, dependent on the altitude of the region. The two northern Indochinese climatic zones on the border influence the climate in the northern part of the province. The lower areas in the province comprise low hills, the Lô River Valley and Hà Giang city. In Cao Bồ district, the dry season lasts from mid-September until the end of May, and the monsoon season lasts from the beginning of June until mid-September. However, in Du Già district the wet season sets in one month earlier. The average annual temperature in the provincial capital of Hà Giang is 22.78 °C (73.00 °F); the monthly averages range from a low of 15.48 °C (59.86 °F) in January to a high of 27.88 °C (82.18 °F) in July. The annual rainfall in Hà Giang city is 2,430.1 millimetres (95.67 in); the monthly average varies from a low of 31.5 millimetres (1.24 in) in December to a high of 515.6 millimetres (20.30 in) in July. The average annual humidity level is 84%.

Hà Giang has many mountains, including the two highest peaks, namely the Tây Côn Lĩnh (2,419 metres (7,936 ft)) and the Kiều Liêu Ti (2,402 metres (7,881 ft)), and also has forests that provide lumber. It has about 1,000 species of herbal plants. The fauna includes tigers, peafowl, pheasants, and pangolin. Hà Giang city was heavily damaged during the 1979 war with China but has since been rebuilt.

== Vegetation ==
Cultivated fields and livestock are generally found in elevations below 800 metres (2,600 ft). Between 800 metres (2,600 ft) and 950 metres (3,120 ft), grasses and wood shrubs (with a maximum height of 3 metres (9.8 ft)) are recorded. Patches of forest with trees (30 metres (98 ft) high and 50 centimetres (20 in) in diameter) are found above 1,000 metres (3,300 ft) with the canopy covering around 80% of the sky. The forest has dense undergrowth with large vines, tree ferns and rhododendrons. Banana, bamboo and secondary scrub grow on both sides of foot tracks in the forests. The forest also has an abundance of cascading streams, seepage streams from limestone formations, waterfalls, glides, and pools. The stiff limestone vertical rock face is seen above 1,100 metres (3,600 ft) on the northeast face of Mount Muong Cha, while its southwest slope exhibits a much gentler gradient, and is converted into agricultural fields. Above 2,000 metres (6,600 ft), there is a montane mixed semideciduous and evergreen cloud forest. This forest has an understory of Ericaceae with shrubs and epiphytic species of rhododendron and vaccinium. Species of Lauraceae, with Ericaceae and Oleaceae (at higher elevations with taxa in the Fagaceae, Primulaceae (formerly Myrsinaceae) and Araliaceae) are also recorded. Most of the tree trunks are covered with bryophyte mosses in this zone.

== Fauna ==
16 reptile species (14 genera, five families) and 36 amphibian species (20 genera, seven families) have been recorded in the province.

Small mammals found on Tây Côn Lĩnh II include Cynopterus sphinx, Rousettus leschenaulti, Sphaerias blanfordi, Scaptonyx fusicaudus, Chodsigoa parca, Chodsigoa caovansunga, Blarinella griselda, Crocidura attenuata, Crocidura fuliginosa, Crocidura wuchihensis, Belomys pearsonii, Callosciurus inornatus, Leopoldamys edwardsi, Niviventer fulvescens, Niviventer langbianis, Niviventer tenaster, Chiropodomys gliroides, Ratufa bicolor, and Tamiops sp.

== History ==
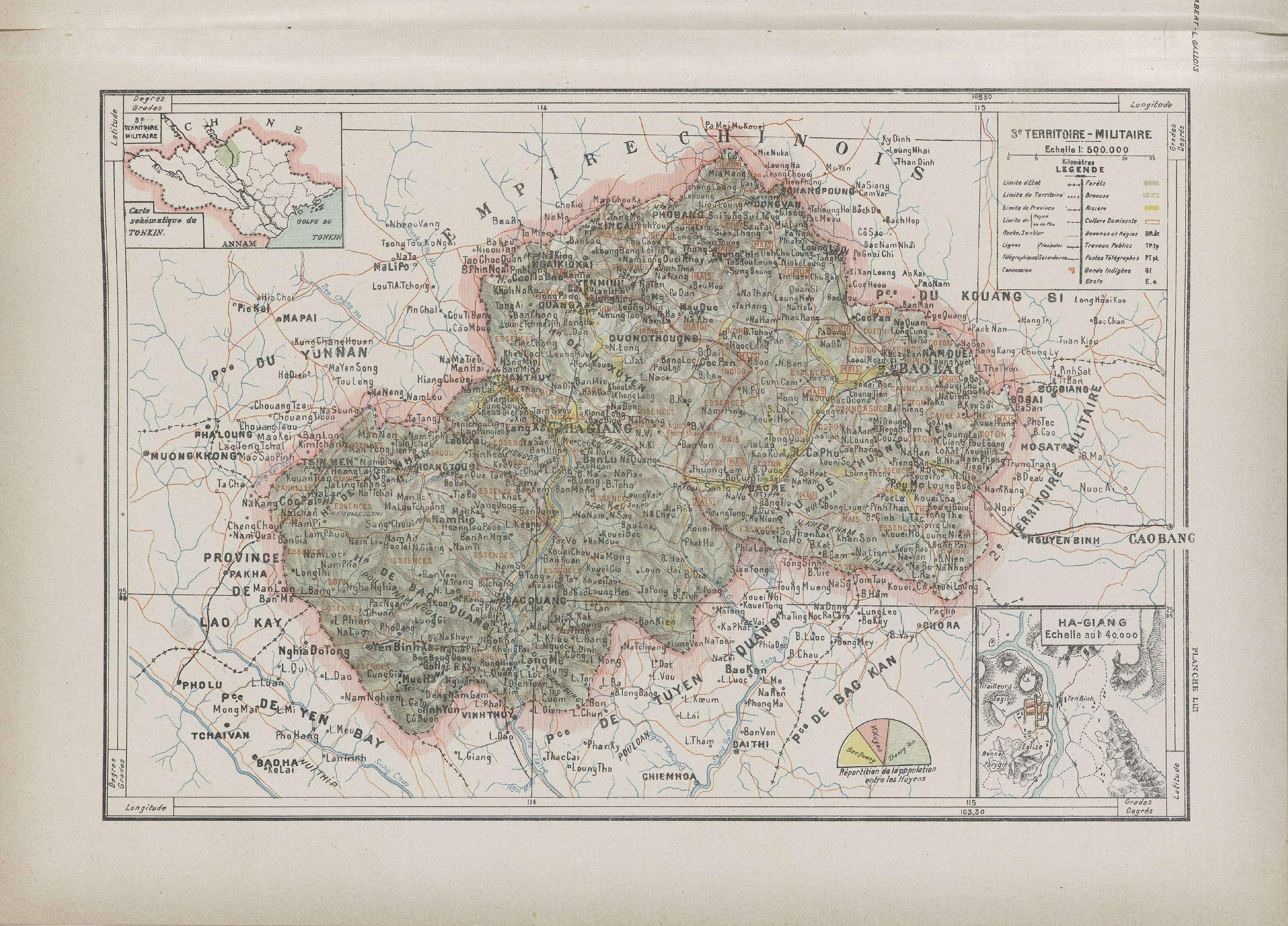
Map of Ha Giang province in 1909

Archaeological excavations carried out near Hà Giang city at Đồi Thông (Pine Hill) have established the region's antiquity to about 30,000 years ago. During the Bronze Age Tày Yu tribes with culturally rich traditions ruled over the region; archaeological findings in the form of bronze drums of that age used for ceremonial purposes are used even to the present day by the Lô Lô and Pu Péo tribes of the region (Mèo Vạc, Hà Giang province).

What was later called Hà Giang province by the French was part of bộ Tân Hưng in ancient times, one of 15 bộ in the nation of Văn Lang. During the Ming dynasty occupation of Vietnam, at the start of the 15th century, it was known as the district of Bình Nguyên, before being later renamed to châu Vị Xuyên.

The French occupied this region in 1886, establishing their military garrison on the east bank of the Lô River and which later became one of the four major military establishments in French Indochina in North Vietnam in 1905. The Vietnamese Dao tribes rebelled against French colonial rule, first in 1901 led by Triệu Tiến Kiến and Triệu Tài Lộc, which was quelled, with the former being killed in the war. However, in 1913, Triệu Tài Lộc organized another rebellion with the help of Triệu Tiến Tiến, another member of his clan, which lasted for two years until 1915. Their slogan was "No Corvees, no taxes for the French; drive out the French to recover our country; liberty for the Dao." This revolt was known as the White Hat Revolt since the Vietnamese carried a white flag engraved with "four ideograms to Quốc Bách Kỹ" (meaning "White Flag of the Fatherland"). The rebellion spread to Tuấn Quang, Lào Cai and Yên Bái. In 1915 the French ruthlessly suppressed the rebellion, deporting many Vietnamese and hanging at least 67 "rebels".

Before 1975, Hà Giang comprised the districts of Đồng Văn, Vị Xuyên, Xín Mần, Yên Minh, Hoàng Su Phì, Bắc Quang, Thanh Thủy, and Quản Bạ.

On November 18, 1983, Bắc Mê District was split from Vị Xuyên District; one commune from Xín Mần District was placed under Hoàng Su Phì District, two communes from Hoàng Su Phì District were placed under Xín Mần District, three communes from Bắc Quang District were placed under Xín Mần District, three communes from Bắc Quang District were placed under Hoàng Su Phì District, and one town and five communes from Bắc Quang District were placed under Vị Xuyên District.

On August 12, 1991, Hà Tuyên Province was re-divided into Tuyên Quang Province and Hà Giang Province. Hà Giang Province comprised Hà Giang city, Bắc Mê District, Bắc Quang District, Đồng Văn District, Hoàng Su Phì District, Mèo Vạc District, Quản Bạ District, Vị Xuyên District, Xín Mần District, and Yên Minh District—a total of one town and nine districts. The provincial capital was Hà Giang Town.

On December 1, 2003, Quang Bình District was split from Bắc Quang District, Hoàng Su Phì District, and Xín Mần District.

On June 23, 2006, the communes of Phú Linh, Kim Sơn, and Kim Linh in Hà Giang Town were placed under the administration of Vị Xuyên District; part of Quang Trung Ward in Hà Giang Town was placed under the Phong Quang Commune of Vị Xuyên District. The communes of Phương Độ and Phương Thiện in Vị Xuyên District were placed under the administration of Hà Giang Town.

On September 27, 2010, Hà Giang Town was upgraded to Hà Giang city.

On June 12, 2025, Hà Giang Province and Tuyên Quang Province were merged to form a new Tuyên Quang Province. The former province was restructured into 2 wards.

The province's name derived from the Sino-Vietnamese 河江.

=== H'Mông lords of Sà Phìn ===
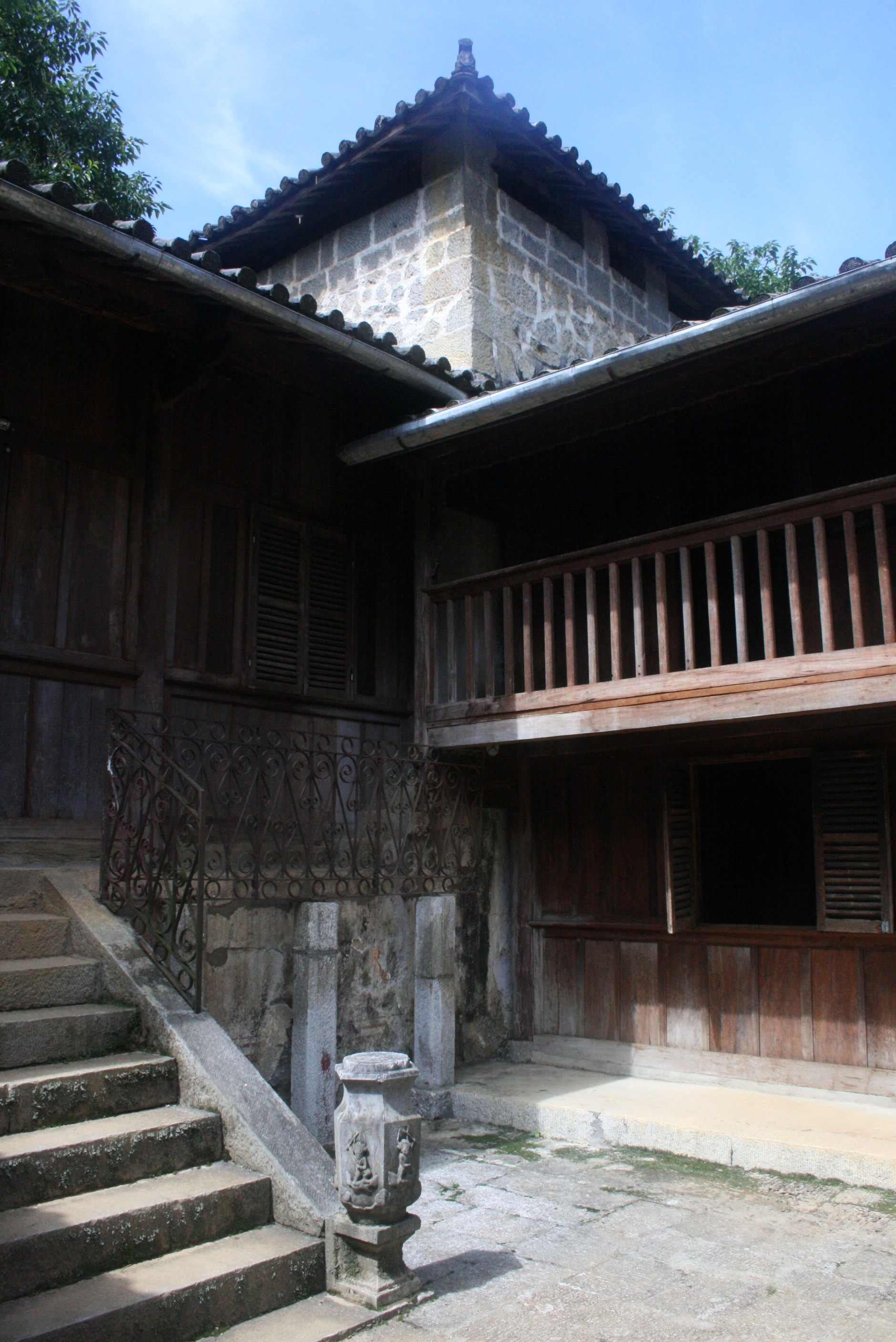

The history of the Hmong lords of the northern region of the province, bordering China (Đồng Văn and Mèo Vạc), is integral to the province, as the Hmong people have dominated the region from the late 18th century. The Vương family of the Huang clan established their rule at Đồng Văn and Mèo Vạc, which was endorsed by the Nguyễn kings.

During French colonial rule, the French further supported the lords in their hold on the border territory. Vương Chính Đức was recognized as the king of the Hmong in 1900. A palace was built between 1902 and 1903 at Sà Phìn (16 km west of Đồng Văn town). The lord's loyalty to the French was evident in the support that they got from him during their campaign to put down a rebellion launched by the local tribes. In recognition, the lord was given the rank of a general in the French Army (a fully uniformed picture of the lord is seen in the interior rooms of the palace).

Increasing opposition by the Vietnamese to French rule saw the lord adopting a neutral stance. Vương Chú Sển, who succeeded his father after the latter's death in 1944, however, pledged support to Ho Chi Minh. The historical palace of the Vương lord was built in the traditional style of northeast Asian royal palaces. It has four double-storied wings, which are linked by three open courtyards. A moat surrounds the palace. Tombs of the royal family members, which are intricately carved in wood, are located outside the palace walls. Only the walls of the buildings are made of bricks, while the rest is made of wood.

== Administrative divisions ==
Hà Giang was subdivided into 11 district-level sub-divisions:

- 10 districts:
  - Bắc Mê
  - Bắc Quang
  - Đồng Văn
  - Hoàng Su Phì
  - Mèo Vạc
  - Quản Bạ
  - Quang Bình
  - Vị Xuyên
  - Xín Mần
  - Yên Minh
- 1 provincial city:
  - Hà Giang (capital)

They were further subdivided into 9 commune-level towns (or townlets), 181 communes, and 5 wards.

=== Table of local government divisions ===
Name	Division type	Population (2003)	Area (km^{2})	Towns (huyện lỵ or thị trấn) (bold) and communes (xã)
Hà Giang	City (thành phố)	44,567	174	Wards (phường): Trần Phú, Minh Khai, Nguyễn Trãi, Quang Trung, Ngọc Hà; Communes (xã): Phương Thiện, Phương Độ, Ngọc Đường
Bắc Mê District	District (huyện)	40,822	844	Yên Phú, Đường Âm, Đường Hồng, Giáp Trung, Lạc Nông, Minh Ngọc, Minh Sơn, Phiêng Luông, Phú Nam, Thượng Tân, Yên Cường, Yên Định, Yên Phong
Bắc Quang District	District (huyện)	103,064	1,084	Việt Quang, Vĩnh Tuy, Quang Minh, Tân Thành, Tân Quang, Tân Lập, Việt Vinh, Hùng An, Đồng Yên, Đông Thành, Vĩnh Phúc, Vĩnh Hảo, Tiên Kiều, Việt Hồng, Kim Ngẩu, Thượng Bình, Vô Điếm, Bằng Hành, Hữu Sản, Liên Hiệp, Đức Xuân, Đồng Tâm, Đồng Tiến.
Đồng Văn District	District (huyện)	57,715	447	Đồng Văn, Phó Bảng, Hố Quáng Phìn, Lũng Cú, Lũng Phìn, Lũng Táo, Lũng Thầu, Má Lé, Phố Cáo, Phố Là, Sà Phìn, Sảng Tủng, Sính Lủng, Sủng Là, Sủng Trái, Tả Lủng, Tả Phìn, Thài Phìn Tủng, Vần Chải
Hoàng Su Phì District	District (huyện)	53,937	629	Vinh Quang, Bản Luốc, Bản Máy, Bản Nhùng, Bản Péo, Bản Phùng, Chiến Phố, Đản Ván, Hồ Thầu, Nam Sơn, Nàng Đôn, Nậm Dịch, Nậm Khòa, Nậm Ty, Ngàm Đăng Vài, Pố Lồ, Pờ Ly Ngài, Sán Xả Hồ, Tả Sử Choóng, Tân Tiến, Thàng Tín, Thèn Chu Phìn, Thông Nguyên, Tụ Nhân, Túng Sán
Mèo Vạc District	District (huyện)	58,944	574	Mèo Vạc, Cán Chu Phìn, Giàng Chu Phìn, Khâu Vai, Lũng Chinh, Lũng Pù, Nậm Ban, Niêm Sơn, Pả Vi, Pải Lủng, Sơn Vĩ, Sủng Máng, Sủng Trà, Tả Lủng, Tát Ngà, Thượng Phùng, Xín Cái, Niêm Tòng
Quản Bạ District	District (huyện)	39,821	550	Tam Sơn, Thái An, Lùng Tám, Đông Hà, ã Quản Bạ, Quyết Tiến, Cán Tỷ, Thanh Vân, Bát Đại Sơn, Nghĩa Thuận, Cao Mã Pờ, Tùng Vài, Tả Ván
Quang Bình District	District (huyện)	53,160	774	Yên Bình, Xuân Minh, Tiên Nguyên, Tân Nam, Bản Rịa, Yên Thành, Tân Trịnh, Tân Bắc, Bằng Lang, Yên Hà, Hương Sơn, Xuân Giang, Nà Khương, Tiên Yên, Vĩ Thượng
Vị Xuyên District	District (huyện)	87,164	1,452	Vị Xuyên, Việt Lâm, Bạch Ngọc, Ngọc Minh, Trung Thành, Ngọc Linh, Linh Hồ, Việt Lâm, Đạo Đức, Phú Linh, Quảng Ngần, Thượng Sơn, Cao Bồ, Kim Linh, Kim Thạch, Phương Tiến, Lao Chải, Xín Chải, Thanh Đức, Thanh Thủy, Minh Tân, Phong Quang, Thuận Hòa, Tùng Bá
Xín Mần District	District (huyện)	50,307	582	Cốc Pài, Nàn Xỉn, Xín Mần, Bản Díu, Chí Cà, Thèn Phàng, Trung Thịnh, Pà Vầy Sủ, Ngán Chiên, Cốc Rế, Tả Nhìu, Thu Tà, Nàn Ma, Bản Ngò, Chế Là, Quảng Nguyên, Nấm Dẩn, Nà Chì, Khuôn Lùng
Yên Minh District	District (huyện)	67,736	782	Yên Minh, Thắng Mố, Phú Lũng, Sủng Tráng, Bạch Đích, Na Khê, Sủng Thài, Hữu Vinh, Lao Và Chải, Mậu Duệ, Đông Minh, Mậu Long, Ngam La, Ngọc Long, Đường Thượng, Lũng Hồ, Du Tiến, Du Già

== Demographics ==
According to the General Statistics Office of the Government of Vietnam, the population of Hà Giang province as of 2019 was 854,679 with a density of 110 people per km^{2} over a total land area of 7,929.48 km^{2} (3,061.59 mi^{2}). It is one of the least populated provinces in the northern midlands and mountain areas of Vietnam. The male population during this period was 431,771 while the female population was 422,908. The rural population was 719,108 against an urban population of 135,571 (about 19% of the rural population).

There are 43 ethnic groups in Hà Giang recognized by the Vietnamese government. Each ethnicity has their own language, traditions, and subculture. The largest ethnic groups are: Mông (34.25%), Tày (22.55%), Dao (14.88%), Vietnamese (12.32%), Nùng (9.53%), Giáy (2.03%), La Chí (1.62%). Others accounted for the remaining 2.82%.

Languages spoken in Hà Giang province include the following.

- Hmong-Mien languages
  - Hmong
  - Iu Mien
  - Kim Mun
  - Pa-Hng (Bắc Quang, Quang Bình)
- Tai languages
  - Nùng
  - Tày
  - Giáy (Yên Minh, Đồng Văn)
  - Buyei (Quan Ba)
- Kra languages
  - Red Gelao (Yên Minh)
  - White Gelao (Đồng Văn)
  - Green Gelao (Đồng Văn
  - Qabiao (Pupeo) (Đồng Văn)
  - Lachi (Hoàng Su Phì, Xín Mần, Bắc Quang)
- Tibeto-Burman languages
  - Red Lolo (Mèo Vạc, Yên Minh)
  - Flowery Lolo (Mèo Vạc, Đồng Văn)
  - Yi (Lolo) (Mèo Vạc, Đồng Văn)

== Economy ==
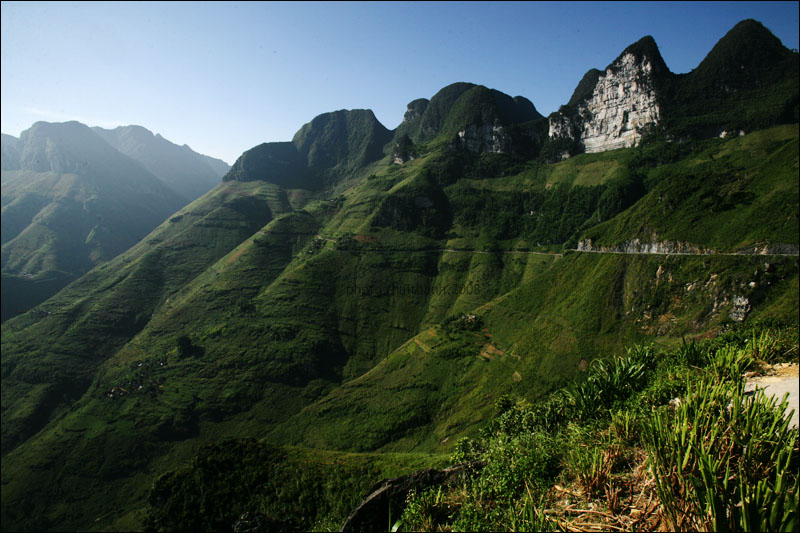

Hà Giang is a highly mountainous region, and travel around the province can be difficult. Much of the province is too mountainous for agriculture, leaving much of the land covered by forests. Hà Giang's central plateau is good for growing plums, peaches, and persimmons, which the province exports. Tea is also grown there. The farming economy is also getting a boost with growing orange and mandarin trees as it sustains many households with an income in the range of VND 150 to 200 million a year. The cultivated area of soybean cultivation (which has a high yield with a yield of 750 kg per ha) has increased to 7,900 hectares (20,000 acres).

Hà Giang is one of the poorest provinces of Vietnam. Traditionally, the vast majority of its economic activity revolved around agriculture and forestry. However, in recent years, there have been attempts to establish a manufacturing industry. Infrastructure in Hà Giang has seen improvement, but remains poor and roads, schools, and health services are underdeveloped compared to many other parts of Vietnam.

Hà Giang province has particularly assisted locals in developing their tea industry with financial (soft loans) and technical support in operations (sowing, tending, gathering and processing). This resulted in an increase in the yield from 9,625 tonnes (1995) to 20,394 tonnes (2002). Particular tea plantations of quality tea are the Shan Tuyết strain in Cao Bồ (Vị Xuyên District), Lũng Phìn (Đồng Văn District) and in Ngam La (Yên Minh District). Hà Giang tea is also popular in foreign markets. The province is rich in minerals; 149 mines with 28 categories of minerals are spread in all districts of the province. Mineral deposits mined in the province are: antimony, iron ore, manganese, ferrite, zinc, tin, copper, bauxite, gold, gemstones, kaolin and mineral water. These are contributing to industrial development in the province. Plans have been put in place, with appropriate policies, to attract direct foreign investments in the province; China, South Korea, Thailand and other countries have already chipped in with investments in the mining and processing industries. The Asian Development Bank provided loans of US$3,000,000 to promote the tea industry in the province. As Hà Giang is a mountainous region, the population is not large, and the majority of inhabitants are ethnic Vietnamese. The remainder are H'Mông, Tày, Dao, Mán, Nùng, Giấy, Lô Lô and Thổ; the majority engage in ancestor and spirit worship. Of the national figure of 7,592 agriculture, forestry and fishery cooperatives, there are only 32 cooperatives in the province, of which 22 are agricultural and eight are fisheries. There are only 169 known farms in the province against the national number of 120,699. The output value of agriculture produce at constant 1994 prices in the province was 838.4 billion dongs against the national value of 156,681.9 billion dongs. The province produced 280,300 tonnes of cereals against the national production of 43.58 million tonnes.

The per capita production of cereals in the district was 397.5 kg against the national figure of 501.8 kg in 2007. In 2007, the industrial output of the province was 526.1 billion dongs against the national output of 1,469,272.3 billion dongs. There is a recently established cement plant with a 300,000 tonne annual capacity.

== Attractions ==
=== Quản Bạ Valley ===
Quản Bạ Valley, located 45 kilometres (28 mi) from Hà Giang city, at 1,945.8 metres (6,384 ft), is called the "Heaven's Gate" and has a TV transmitter on a peak. Uniformly shaped hills of the valley are viewed from this summit. Quản Bạ Pass provides views of Thach Nui Doi (literal meaning: double stalagmite, but also known as "Two Stone Breasts" in the valley below). The valley has forested hills and meadows, with temperatures ranging between 10 °C (50 °F) in winter and 24 °C (75 °F) in summer. It is known for its secret grottoes and caves, colourful orchids, plum and peach trees, persimmon orchards, medicinal plants and many more. The town of Đồng Văn is famous for its Phó Bảng Street which features multistoried buildings built with clay bricks and tiled roofs. The weekly market is where the Tày and H'Mông ethnic groups of the province visit in large numbers to trade in various types of goods and colourful hand woven cloth.

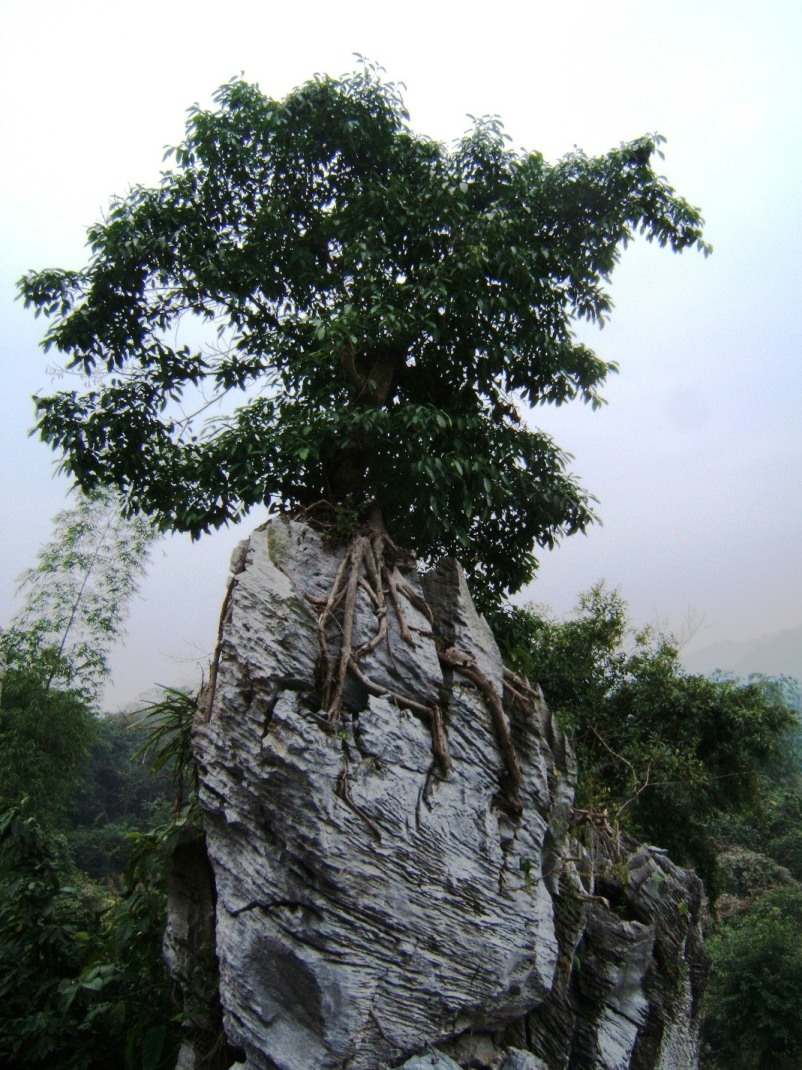
Tree on Top of limestone peak in Cao Bành village, Phương Thiện commune

=== Phương Thiện Cave ===
Phương Thiện Cave is 7 kilometres (4.3 mi) to the south of Hà Giang city. It is the location of many sights, especially natural caves and grottos of Doi, Lang Lô and Phương Thiện. The surrounding area is also known for its plums, pears, oranges, apples and Tuyết Sơn tea above 900 metres (3,000 ft). Chui Cave lies 7 kilometres (4.3 mi) to the south of Hà Giang. It is set about 100 metres (330 ft) into the face of the hill. Tiên Cave is 2 kilometres (1.2 mi) from Hà Giang city. According to folklore, heavenly female beings came there to bathe in the lunar new year, thus its name. The local populace uses it as a water source and to pray for good luck in the new year.

=== Đồng Văn ===
Đồng Văn is a market town 16 kilometres (9.9 mi) from Sà Phìn and 3 kilometres (1.9 mi) from the Chinese border and is inhabited by the Tày and H'Mông people. It is located at an altitude of 1,025 metres (3,363 ft) and experiences temperatures of 0 °C (32 °F) in winter and 24 °C (75 °F) in the summer months. The highland region is famous for fruits such as Hau plums, peaches and persimmons without seeds. It has plants such as ginseng, cinnamon and anise.

=== Mã Pí Lèng ===
Mã Pí Lèng is a mountain pass at about 1,500 metres (4,900 ft) which forms the basin boundary of the Nho Quế River on the border with China and is restricted zone. The market, held at Khâu Vai, which is about 20 kilometres (12 mi) from Mèo Vạc, is where once a year on the 27th day of the third month of the Lunar calendar an event known famously as the Khâu Vai "Love Market" takes place. The ethnic clans of White H'Mông, Tày, and Lô Lô congregate here, particularly the young, in search of life partners or to exchange partners. The Lô Lô people who dominate the local village by the same name in particular come here in their colourful regale.

=== Chợ tình Khâu Vai ===
The Chợ tình Khâu Vai market only meets once a year, on the 27th day of the third lunar month at Khâu Vai commune in Mèo Vạc district, based on an old folk tale. A long time ago, there was a young beautiful couple who were in love but they were in different districts, which would have meant that she would have moved to her husband's area. Her home district opposed this, while the boy's district wanted this, causing political tension. When the couple was meeting, the two groups descended into warfare. To avoid bloodshed for their societies, the couple decided to break up and only secretly meet once a year on the anniversary, at Khâu Vai. Since then the area has become a dating spot for couples. In the last 10 years, economic pressures have led to a market being set up to capitalise on the anniversary celebrations.

=== Đồi Thông ===
Đồi Thông (Pine Hill) settlement is an ancient settlement dating back 30,000 years, belonging to the Sơn Vi period as established by archaeological excavations. The excavations had unearthed antiquity axe heads and primitive tools which are displayed in the local museum at Hà Giang and the History Museum in Hanoi.

=== Hà Giang museum ===
Hà Giang museum, located in the centre of Hà Giang city, not only has an array of findings from archaeological excavations but also houses historical artefacts, a bronze drum collection and also costumes of the local ethnic clans. The museum building is in the form of a big lotus opening up its petals, in a red and white colour mansion.

=== Hà Giang market ===
Hà Giang market is an important market centre in Hà Giang city on the east bank of the Lô River. Tày, Nùng, Red Dao and White H'Mông ethnic groups congregate every Sunday at the market.

=== Lang Si ===
Lang Si is a village at the Lang Si pass where the White H'Mông tribes assemble at the market held once every six days. The village is 116 kilometres (72 mi) from Hà Giang and parts of the border wall built by the French army are seen here delimiting the border of the White H'Mông Kingdom. It is a honey-producing area and has many apiaries.

=== Sà Phìn ===
Sà Phìn is a small town in the remote Sà Phìn valley (2 kilometres (1.2 mi) from the Chinese border) where H'Mông Lords ruled. The unique feature is of the large double-storied houses which are built in Chinese style made out of yellow bricks with Chinese style roofs. The twin white towered palace building is distinct among the 20 odd buildings.

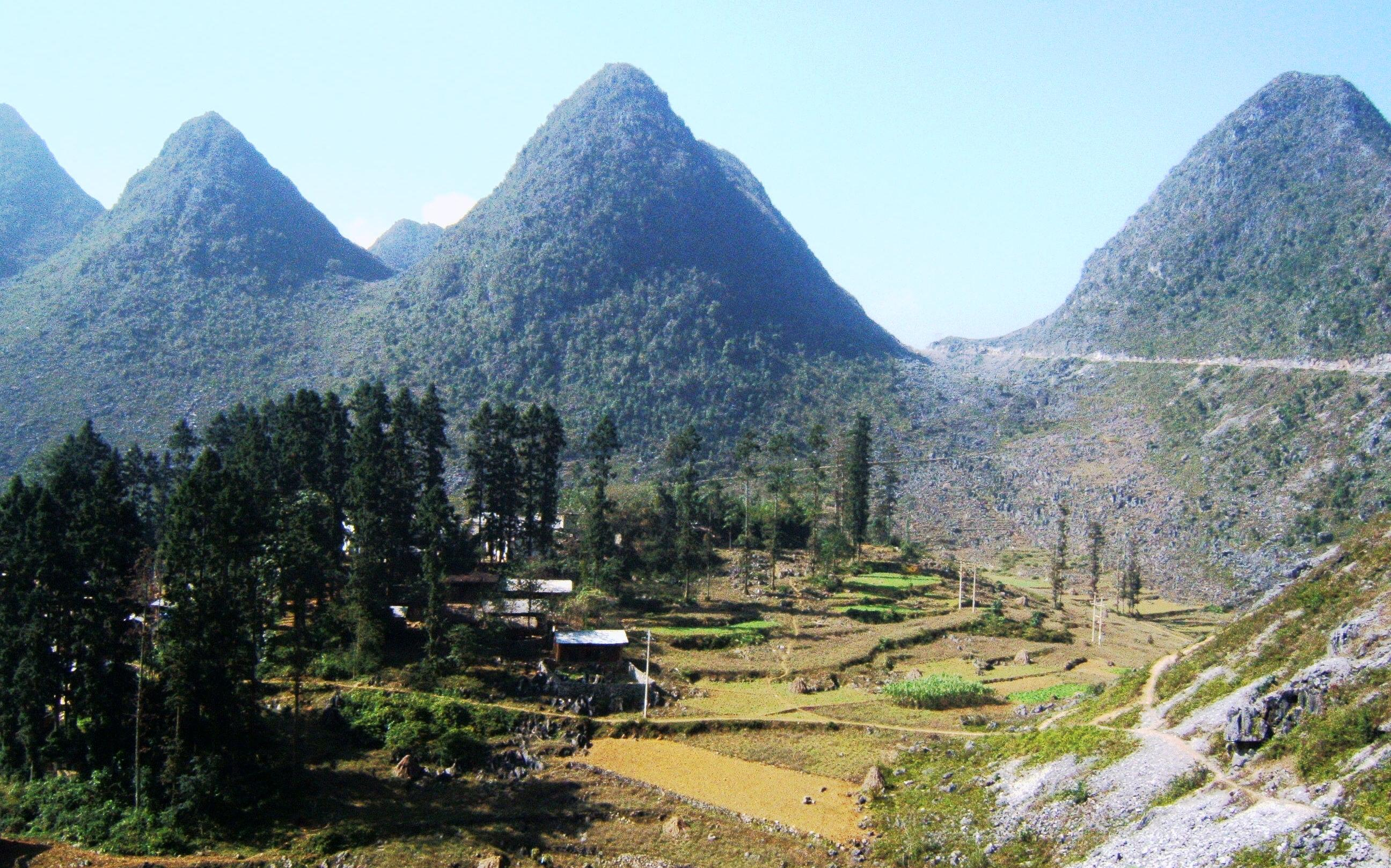
Residence of the H'Mông Lord on Turtle Hill in Sà Phìn commune, Hà Giang province

=== Khu nhà Dòng họ Vương ===
The Vương family mansion is an architectural heritage landmark in Sà Phìn commune, Đồng Văn district that was listed by the government in 1993. At the start of the 20th century, Vương Chính Đức, a member of the H'Mông people, was appointed the Bang Tá and he had the family residence expanded into a mansion from where he worked. It is of a style that is rare in this mountainous region of northern Vietnam. The building was designed in the style of the later period of the Qing dynasty of China, and is grouped into three sections, the front, middle and rear. It comprises six lengthwise and four sideways buildings, two levels, 64 rooms and 1,120 metres (3,670 ft) of land space. The building is surrounded by a stone wall, with a width of 0.6–0.9 metres (2.0–3.0 ft) and a height of 2.5–3 metres (8.2–9.8 ft). The mansion is 145 kilometres (90 mi) to the northwest of Hà Giang city and 24 kilometres (15 mi) to the southwest of the district of Đồng Văn.

=== Nho Quế River ===
The Nho Quế River originates in Yunnan Province, China, and flows through Đồng Văn and Mèo Vạc districts before joining the Gâm River. The river is known for the deep canyon it forms beneath the Mã Pí Lèng Pass, often described as one of the deepest river gorges in Southeast Asia. Boat tours along the river provide views of steep limestone cliffs and emerald-coloured waters, making it one of Hà Giang’s most photographed natural attractions.

== Festivals ==
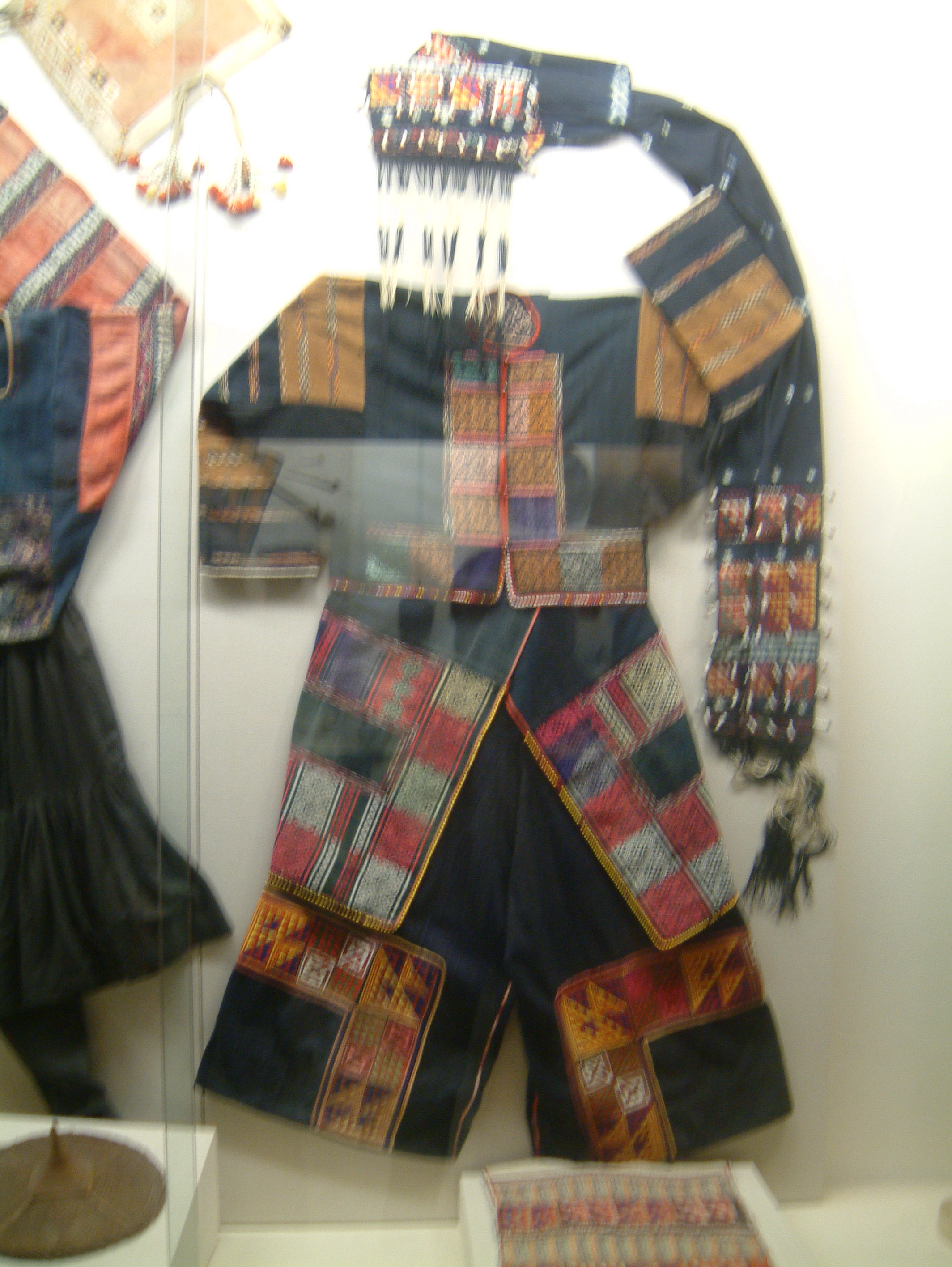
Traditional female clothing of the Yi (Lô Lô) people

Hà Giang has many cultural festivals due to the presence of more than 20 ethnic minority groups. Many of these groups are noted for their artistic abilities, especially their weaving and hand-made textile products. The Spring Festival is celebrated by the H'Mông and Dao people, usually shortly after the Lunar New Year and lasts between three and seven days. The people celebrate with singing and feasting and drinking alcohol. The Buckwheat Flower Festival, organized to celebrate the blooming season of buckwheat flowers across the Dong Van Karst Plateau; and the Long Tong Festival, a traditional agricultural festival of the Tay people marking the beginning of a new farming season.
