= Đồng Văn district =

Coordinates: 23.2800°N 105.3636°E

Đồng Văn District Huyện Đồng Văn
- District
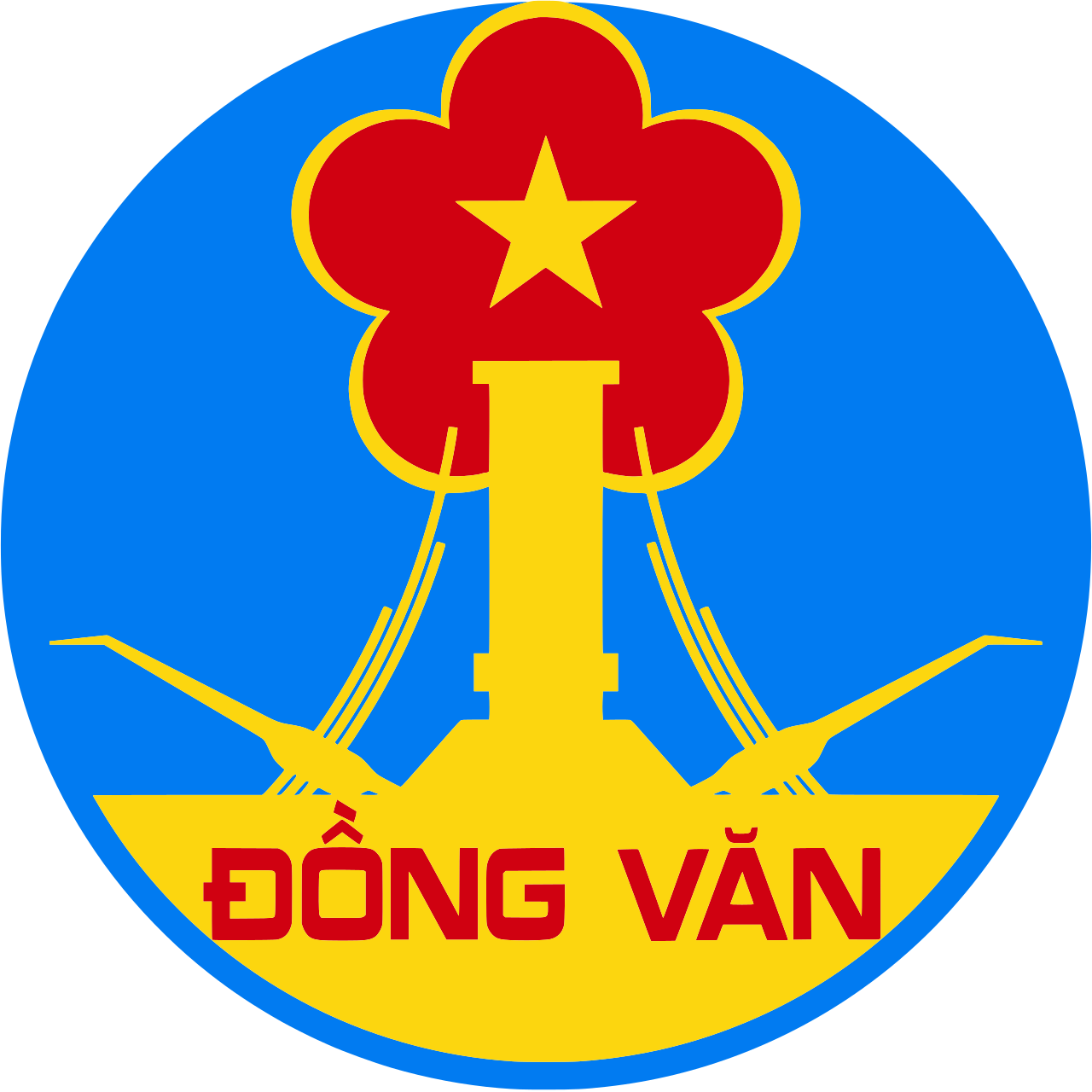
- Seal
- Interactive map of Đồng Văn District
- Country: Vietnam
- Region: Northeast
- Province: Hà Giang
- Capital: Đồng Văn

Area
  - Total: 447 km^{2} (173 sq mi)

Population (2019)
  - Total: 81 880
- Time zone: UTC+7 (Indochina Time)

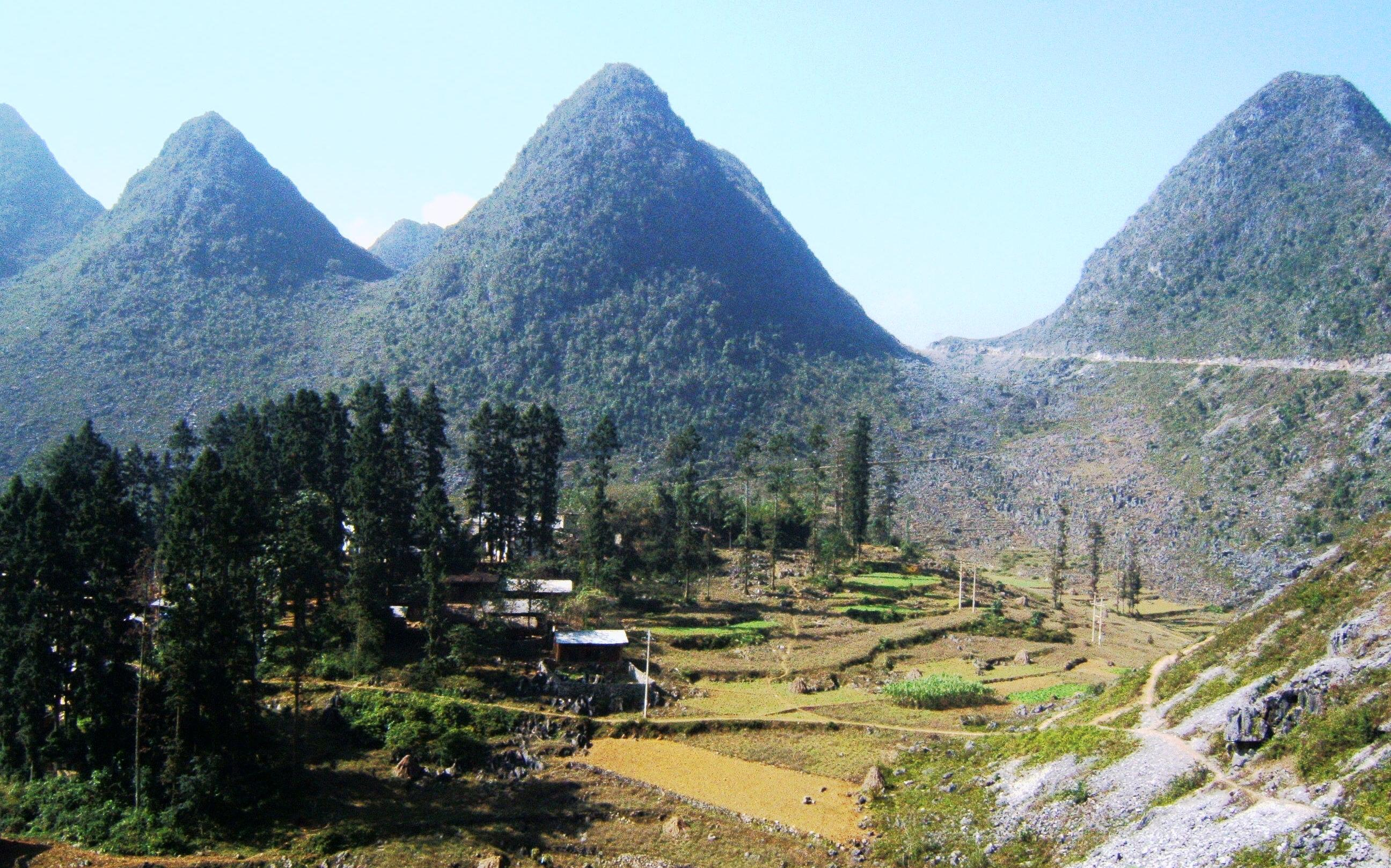
Residence of Hmong Lord on the Turtle Hill in Sà Phìn commune, Đồng Văn district, Hà Giang province.

Đồng Văn is a former rural district of Hà Giang province in the Northeast region of Vietnam. As of 2019, the district had a population of 81,880. The district covers an area of 447 km^{2}. The district capital lies at Đồng Văn.

== Administrative divisions ==
Đồng Văn District consists of two townships, Đồng Văn and Phố Bảng, and the communes of Hố Quáng Phìn, Lũng Cú, Lũng Phìn, Lũng Táo, Lũng Thầu, Má Lé, Phố Cáo, Phố Là, Sà Phìn, Sảng Tủng, Sính Lủng, Sủng Là, Sủng Trái, Tả Lủng, Tả Phìn, Thài Phìn Tủng and Vần Chải.

== Attractions ==
Đồng Văn District is known for its mountainous landscapes and cultural heritage associated with ethnic minority communities. One of the most prominent attractions is the Đồng Văn Karst Plateau Geopark, recognized for its extensive limestone formations and geological significance. The area is characterized by rugged terrain, valleys, and high-altitude environments shaped over millions of years.

Other notable sites include the Đồng Văn Old Quarter, Thẩm Mã Pass, Phó Bảng Town, Vương family mansion, Đồng Văn Market.

== See also ==
- Dong Van Karst Plateau Geopark
- Đồng Văn riot
