= Quản Bạ district =

Coordinates: 23.083°N 104.917°E

Quản Bạ district Huyện Quản Bạ
- District
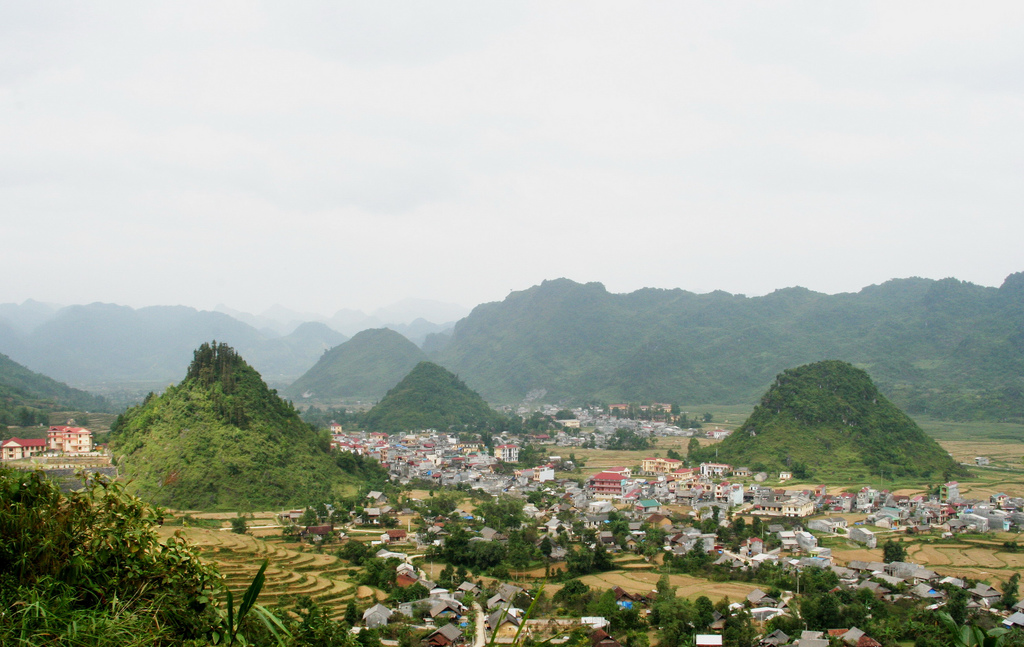

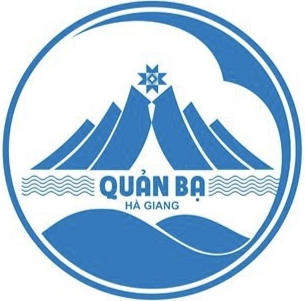
- Seal
- Interactive map of Quản Bạ district
- Country: Vietnam
- Region: Northeast
- Province: Ha Giang
- Capital: Tam Sơn

Area
  - Total: 210 sq mi (550 km^{2})

Population (2019)
  - Total: 53 476
- Time zone: UTC+7 (Indochina Time)

Quản Bạ is a former rural district of Ha Giang province in the Northeast region of Vietnam. As of 2019, the district had a population of 53,476. The district covers an area of 550 km^{2}. The district capital lies at Tam Sơn.

== Administrative divisions ==
Quản Bạ District consists of the district capital, Tam Sơn, and 12 communes: Bát Đại Sơn, Cán Tỷ, Cao Mã Pờ, Đông Hà, Lùng Tám, Nghĩa Thuận, Quản Bạ, Quyết Tiến, Tả Ván, Thái An, Thanh Vân and Tùng Vài.
