= Quang Bình district =

Quang Bình District Huyện Quang Bình
- District
- Interactive map of Quang Bình District
- Coordinates: 22.4134°N 104.6528°E
- Country: Vietnam
- Region: Northeast
- Province: Hà Giang
- Capital: Yên Bình

Area
  - Total: 299 sq mi (774 km^{2})

Population (2019)
  - Total: 61 711
- Time zone: UTC+7 (Indochina Time)

Quang Bình is a former rural district of Hà Giang province in the Northeast region of Vietnam. As of 2019 the district had a population of 61,711. The district covers an area of 774 km^{2}. The district capital is Yên Bình.
