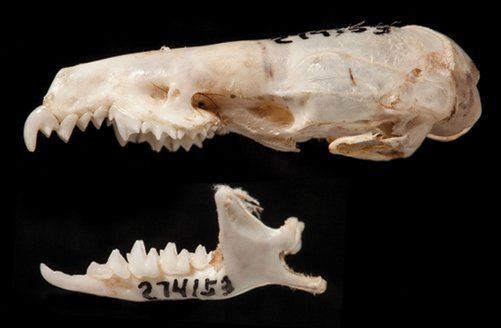

Conservation status
- Data Deficient (IUCN 3.1)

Scientific classification
- Kingdom: Animalia
- Phylum: Chordata
- Class: Mammalia
- Order: Eulipotyphla
- Family: Soricidae
- Genus: Crocidura
- Species: C. wuchihensis

Binomial name
- Crocidura wuchihensis Wang, 1966

= Hainan Island shrew =

Species of mammal

The Hainan Island shrew (Crocidura wuchihensis) is a species of mammal in the family Soricidae native to China and Vietnam. The IUCN has insufficient data to assess the level of population and its trend.

== Distribution and habitat ==
The Hainan Island shrew is known from Hainan Island in China and from northern Vietnam where it is present on Mount Tay Con Linh II in Ha Giang Province. The exact extent of its distribution is unknown but it has been found in forests at altitudes of between 1,300 and 1,500 m (4,265 and 4,921 ft).
