= Bắc Mê district =

Coordinates: 22.750°N 105.250°E

Bắc Mê district Huyện Bắc Mê
- District
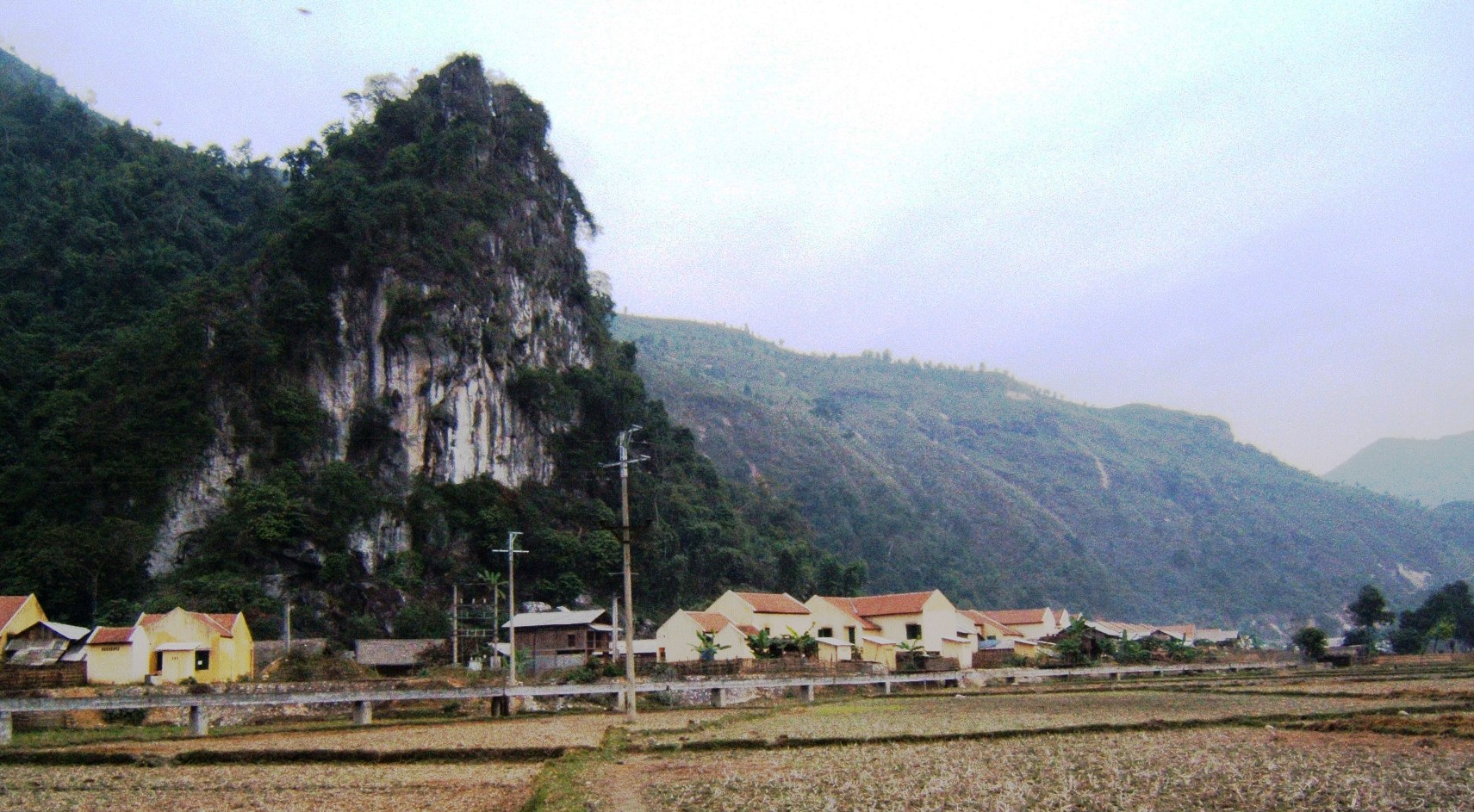
- The Tuyen Quang hydroelectric resettlement area in Na Sai village, Minh Ngoc commune, in 2007.
- Interactive map of Bắc Mê district
- Country: Vietnam
- Region: Northeast
- Province: Hà Giang
- Capital: Yên Phú

Population (2019)
  - Total: 54 592
- Time zone: UTC+7 (Indochina Time)

Bắc Mê is a former rural district of Hà Giang province in the Northeast region of Vietnam. As of 2019, the district had a population of 54 592. The district covers an area of 844 km^{2} (326 sq mi). The district capital lies at Yên Phú.

== Administrative divisions ==
Bắc Mê District consists of the district capital, Yên Phú, and 12 communes: Đường Âm, Đường Hồng, Giáp Trung, Lạc Nông, Minh Ngọc, Minh Sơn, Phiêng Luông, Phú Nam, Thượng Tân, Yên Cường, Yên Định and Yên Phong.

== Climate ==
Climate data for Bắc Mê
Month	Jan	Feb	Mar	Apr	May	Jun	Jul	Aug	Sep	Oct	Nov	Dec	Year
Record high °C (°F)	32.3 (90.1)	35.5 (95.9)	37.8 (100.0)	40.2 (104.4)	41.6 (106.9)	40.0 (104.0)	39.8 (103.6)	40.0 (104.0)	38.2 (100.8)	37.3 (99.1)	33.8 (92.8)	31.8 (89.2)	41.6 (106.9)
Mean daily maximum °C (°F)	19.7 (67.5)	21.5 (70.7)	24.9 (76.8)	29.0 (84.2)	31.9 (89.4)	32.7 (90.9)	32.8 (91.0)	33.0 (91.4)	31.8 (89.2)	28.7 (83.7)	25.1 (77.2)	21.5 (70.7)	27.7 (81.9)
Daily mean °C (°F)	15.0 (59.0)	16.7 (62.1)	19.9 (67.8)	23.6 (74.5)	26.0 (78.8)	27.2 (81.0)	27.3 (81.1)	27.0 (80.6)	25.6 (78.1)	22.8 (73.0)	19.2 (66.6)	15.7 (60.3)	22.2 (72.0)
Mean daily minimum °C (°F)	12.4 (54.3)	13.9 (57.0)	16.8 (62.2)	20.1 (68.2)	22.3 (72.1)	23.9 (75.0)	24.1 (75.4)	23.8 (74.8)	22.2 (72.0)	19.7 (67.5)	16.1 (61.0)	12.5 (54.5)	19.0 (66.2)
Record low °C (°F)	0.3 (32.5)	1.4 (34.5)	4.2 (39.6)	10.0 (50.0)	13.9 (57.0)	15.6 (60.1)	19.1 (66.4)	20.0 (68.0)	13.2 (55.8)	8.7 (47.7)	4.6 (40.3)	−0.1 (31.8)	−0.1 (31.8)
Average precipitation mm (inches)	29.3 (1.15)	26.0 (1.02)	49.4 (1.94)	89.9 (3.54)	230.4 (9.07)	308.6 (12.15)	339.4 (13.36)	261.8 (10.31)	143.9 (5.67)	88.4 (3.48)	50.5 (1.99)	25.1 (0.99)	1,642.4 (64.66)
Average rainy days	7.8	7.0	8.6	11.9	16.9	19.8	22.1	19.1	12.8	10.7	8.7	5.9	150.9
Average relative humidity (%)	83.5	81.6	80.5	80.4	81.7	85.4	86.7	86.5	85.4	85.0	84.6	83.5	83.7
Source: Vietnam Institute for Building Science and Technology
