= Vị Xuyên =

Vị Xuyên Xã Vị Xuyên
- Commune
- Vị Xuyên commune
- Location within Vietnam
- Coordinates: 22°40′11″N 104°58′52″E
- Country: Vietnam
- Region: Northeast
- Province: Tuyên Quang
- Time zone: UTC+7 (UTC + 7)

Vị Xuyên is a commune (xã) of Tuyên Quang Province, Vietnam.
