= Quản Bạ =

Quản Bạ Xã Quản Bạ
- Rural commune
- Quản Bạ commune
- Location within Vietnam
- Coordinates: 23°03′35″N 105°00′38″E
- Country: Vietnam
- Region: Northeast
- Province: Tuyên Quang
- Time zone: UTC+7 (UTC + 7)

Quản Bạ is a rural commune (xã) of Tuyên Quang Province, Vietnam.

The entire natural area and population of Tam Sơn Township, Quyết Tiến Commune, and Quản Bạ Commune are rearranged to form a new commune named Quản Bạ Commune.
