= Xín Mần =

Xín Mần Xã Xín Mần
- Rural commune
- Xín Mần commune
- Location within Vietnam
- Coordinates: 22°44′22″N 104°29′47″E
- Country: Vietnam
- Region: Northeast
- Province: Tuyên Quang
- Time zone: UTC+7 (UTC + 7)

Xín Mần is a rural commune (xã) of Tuyên Quang Province, Vietnam.
