= Yên Minh district =

Yên Minh District Huyện Yên Minh
- District
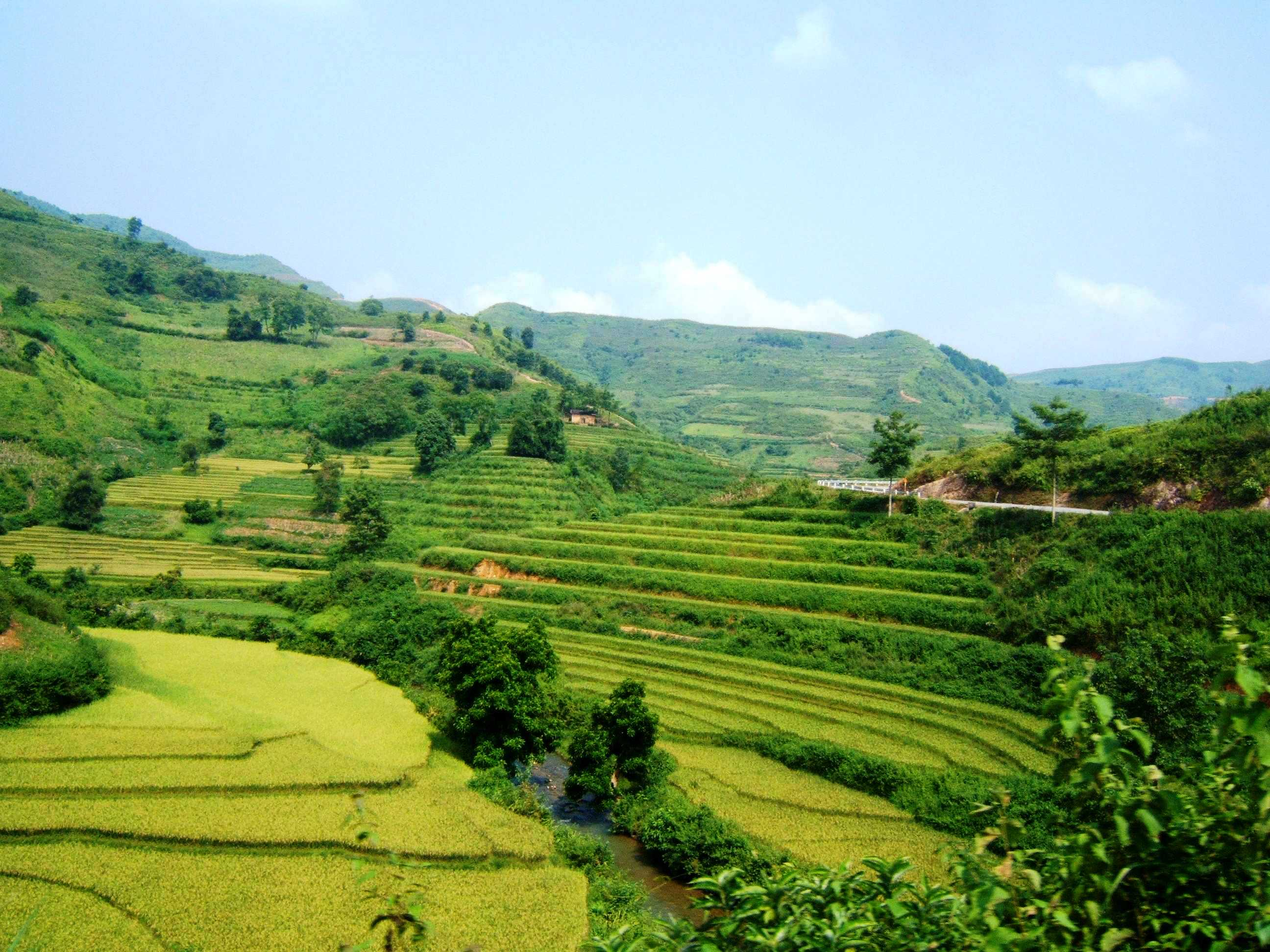
- Rice terrace field in autumn in Yên Minh district.

- Location within Vietnam
- Coordinates: 23.167°N 105.167°E
- Country: Vietnam
- Region: Northeast
- Province: Hà Giang
- Capital: Yên Minh

Area
  - Total: 302 sq mi (782 km^{2})

Population (2019)
  - Total: 97 553
- Time zone: UTC+7 (Indochina Time)

Yên Minh is a former rural district of Hà Giang province in the Northeast region of Vietnam. As of 2019 the district had a population of 97,553. The district covers an area of 782 km^{2}. The district capital lies at Yên Minh.

== Administrative divisions ==
Yên Minh District consists of the district capital, Yên Minh, and 17 communes: Bạch Đích, Đông Minh, Du Già, Du Tiến, Đường Thượng, Hữu Vinh, Lao Và Chải, Lũng Hồ, Mậu Duệ, Mậu Long, Na Khê, Ngam La, Ngọc Long, Phú Lũng, Sủng Thài, Sủng Cháng, and Thắng Mố.

== Cultural Identity ==
Yên Minh District has an area of approximately 783.65 km² and is home to 16 ethnic groups, including H’Mông, Dao, Tày, Nùng, and Pu Péo. It borders Mèo Vạc District to the east, Bắc Mê District to the south, Quản Bạ District to the west, and Yunnan (China) to the north. The district is characterized by a diverse cultural landscape shaped by its multi-ethnic population.
