= Mèo Vạc =

Coordinates: 23.167°N 105.417°E

Mèo Vạc Commune Xã Mèo Vạc
- Commune
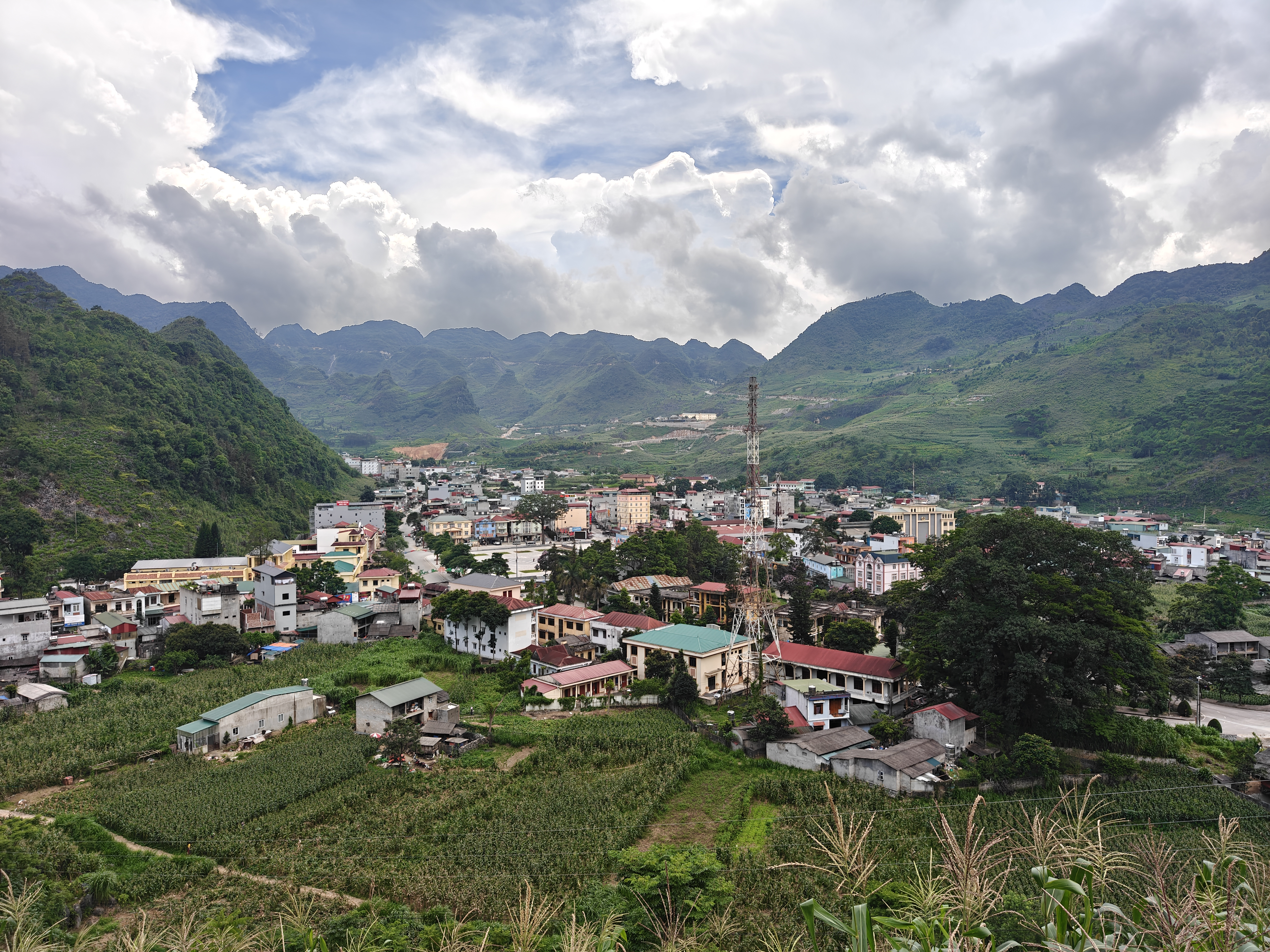
- Central area of Mèo Vạc Commune, Tuyên Quang Province as of 2025

- Location within Vietnam
- Country: Vietnam
- Province: Tuyên Quang Province
- Established: June 16, 2025
- Administrative centre: Residential Group 1

Area
  - Total: 92.21 km^{2} (35.60 sq mi)

Population
  - Total: 18,979
  - Density: 205.8/km^{2} (533.1/sq mi)
- Time zone: UTC+7 (Indochina Time)

Mèo Vạc is a commune of Tuyên Quang province in the Northeast region of Vietnam. As of 2025 the commune had a population of 18,979. It is renowned for its rugged and spectacular limestone mountains, rich Hmong cultural traditions, the UNESCO-recognized Sunday Love Market, and even the stunning canyon river, the Nho Que River (Sông Nho Quê) – one of nature's wonders. Consequently, it attracts numerous international tourists.

== Geography ==
Mèo Vạc Commune borders Đồng Văn Commune to the northwest, Sủng Máng Commune to the west, Sơn Vĩ Commune to the northeast, Khâu Vai Commune to the southeast, and Tát Ngà Commune to the south.

== History ==
On June 16, 2025, Vietnam abolished the district-level administrative division. Mèo Vạc Township, Tả Lủng Commune, Giàng Chu Phìn Commune, and Pả Vi Commune were merged to form Mèo Vạc Commune, under the administration of Tuyên Quang Province.

== Administrative divisions ==
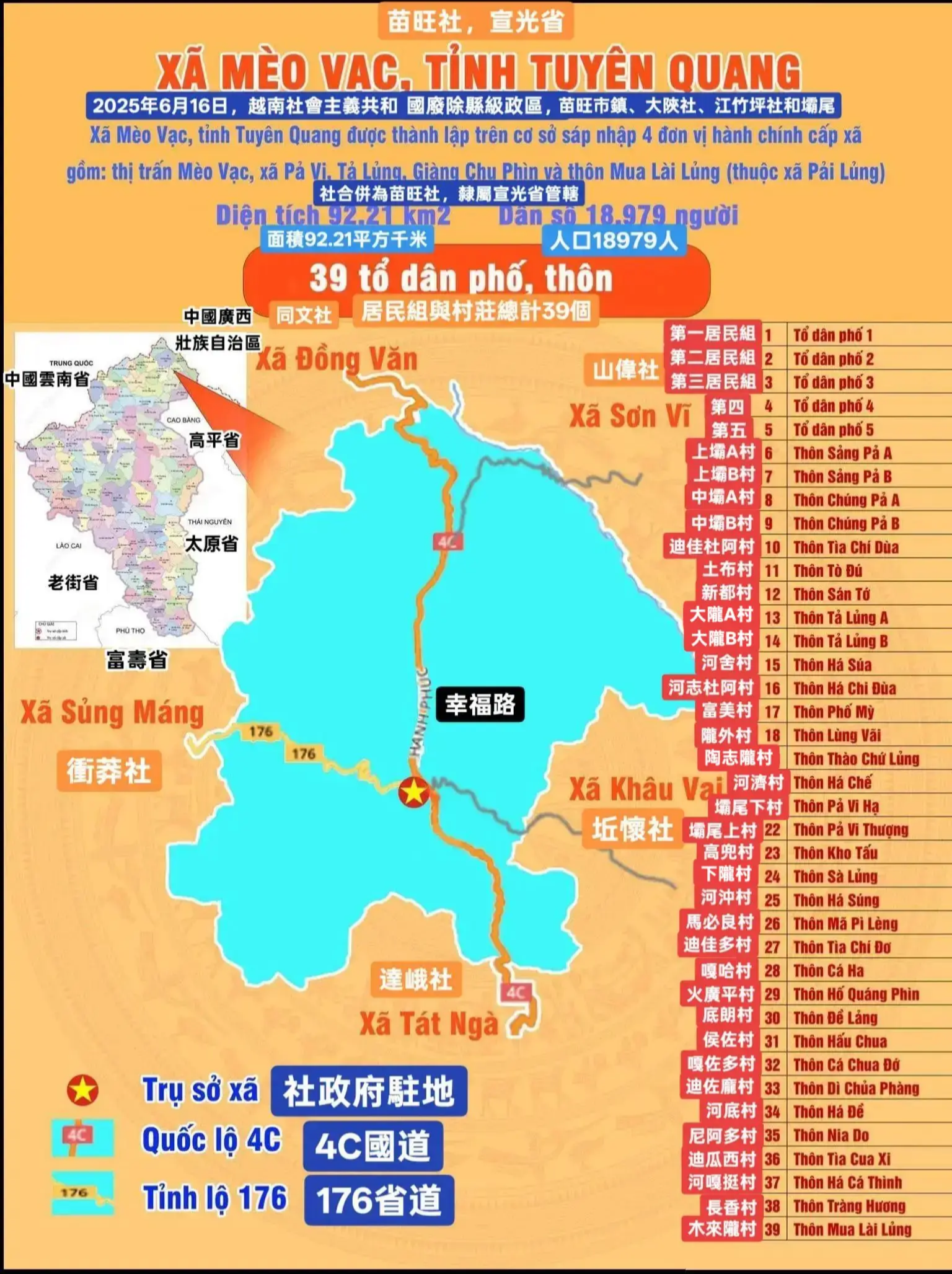
Map of Mèo Vạc Commune with Chinese annotations

Mèo Vạc Commune is subdivided into 39 administrative units, comprising 5 Residential Groups (Tổ dân phố) and 34 Villages (Thôn):

1. Residential Group 1 (Tổ dân phố 1)
2. Residential Group 2 (Tổ dân phố 2)
3. Residential Group 3 (Tổ dân phố 3)
4. Residential Group 4 (Tổ dân phố 4)
5. Residential Group 5 (Tổ dân phố 5)
6. Sáng Pả A Village (Thôn Sáng Pả A)
7. Sáng Pả B Village (Thôn Sáng Pả B)
8. Chúng Pả A Village (Thôn Chúng Pả A)
9. Chúng Pả B Village (Thôn Chúng Pả B)
10. Tìa Chí Dùa Village (Thôn Tìa Chí Dùa)
11. Tò Đú Village (Thôn Tò Đú)
12. Sán Tớ Village (Thôn Sán Tớ)
13. Tả Lủng A Village (Thôn Tả Lủng A)
14. Tả Lủng B Village (Thôn Tả Lủng B)
15. Há Súa Village (Thôn Há Súa)
16. Há Chi Đùa Village (Thôn Há Chi Đùa)
17. Phố Mỳ Village (Thôn Phố Mỳ)
18. Lùng Vãi Village (Thôn Lùng Vãi)
19. Thào Chứ Lủng Village (Thôn Thào Chứ Lủng)
20. Há Chế Village (Thôn Há Chế)
21. Pả Vi Hạ Village (Thôn Pả Vi Hạ)
22. Pả Vi Thượng Village (Thôn Pả Vi Thượng)
23. Kho Tấu Village (Thôn Kho Tấu)
24. Sà Lủng Village (Thôn Sà Lủng)
25. Há Súng Village (Thôn Há Súng)
26. Mã Pì Lèng Village (Thôn Mã Pì Lèng)
27. Tìa Chí Đơ Village (Thôn Tìa Chí Đơ)
28. Cá Ha Village (Thôn Cá Ha)
29. Hố Quáng Phìn Village (Thôn Hố Quáng Phìn)
30. Đề Lảng Village (Thôn Đề Lảng)
31. Hấu Chua Village (Thôn Hấu Chua)
32. Cá Chua Đớ Village (Thôn Cá Chua Đớ)
33. Dì Chủa Phàng Village (Thôn Dì Chủa Phàng)
34. Há Đề Village (Thôn Há Đề)
35. Nia Do Village (Thôn Nia Do)
36. Tìa Cua Xi Village (Thôn Tìa Cua Xi)
37. Há Cá Thình Village (Thôn Há Cá Thình)
38. Tràng Hương Village (Thôn Tràng Hương)
39. Mua Lài Lủng Village (Thôn Mua Lài Lủng)

== Transportation ==
- Provincial Route 176: Connects to Sủng Máng Commune in the west and reaches the central area of the commune in the east; total length approximately 13 km.
- National Route 4C: Runs from Đồng Văn Commune in the north to Tát Ngà Commune in the south; the section within the commune is about 17 km long.

== Main attractions and activities ==
=== Natural landscapes ===
- Tu Sản Gorge (Hẻm vực Tu Sản) - A karst gorge formed by the erosion of the Nho Quế River, located at the foot of Mã Pì Lèng mountain.
- Mã Pì Lèng Pass (Đèo Mã Pì Lèng) - The highest mountain pass in northern Vietnam (north of Hải Vân Pass), one of the "Four Great Passes" of the northern mountainous region. It has an elevation of 1,200 meters and a length of 20 km.
- Happy Road (Con đường Hạnh Phúc / QL4C) - A scenic highway connecting the mountainous districts of the former Hà Giang Province.
- Fairy Mountain White Cliff (Vách đá trắng Núi Tiên) - A geological wonder featuring limestone cliffs.
- Sán Tớ Primary Forest (Rừng nguyên sinh Sán Tớ) - A provincial-level nature reserve.

=== Cultural landmarks ===
- Hmong Community Cultural Tourism Village (Pả Vi Hạ Village) - A living museum showcasing the traditional lifestyle of the Hmong people.
- Lô Lô Ethnic Cultural Village - A community recognized by UNESCO for the safeguarding of its intangible cultural heritage.
- Youth Volunteer Monument - A monument commemorating the builders of the Happy Road constructed in 1959.
- Viewpoint (located in Mèo Vạc Commune) - A scenic overlook offering panoramic views of Mèo Vạc Commune and the Mã Pì Lèng Gorge.

=== Unique settlements ===
- Ancient House of Chúng Pủa - A traditional stilt house of a 19th-century Hmong village headman.

== Gallery ==
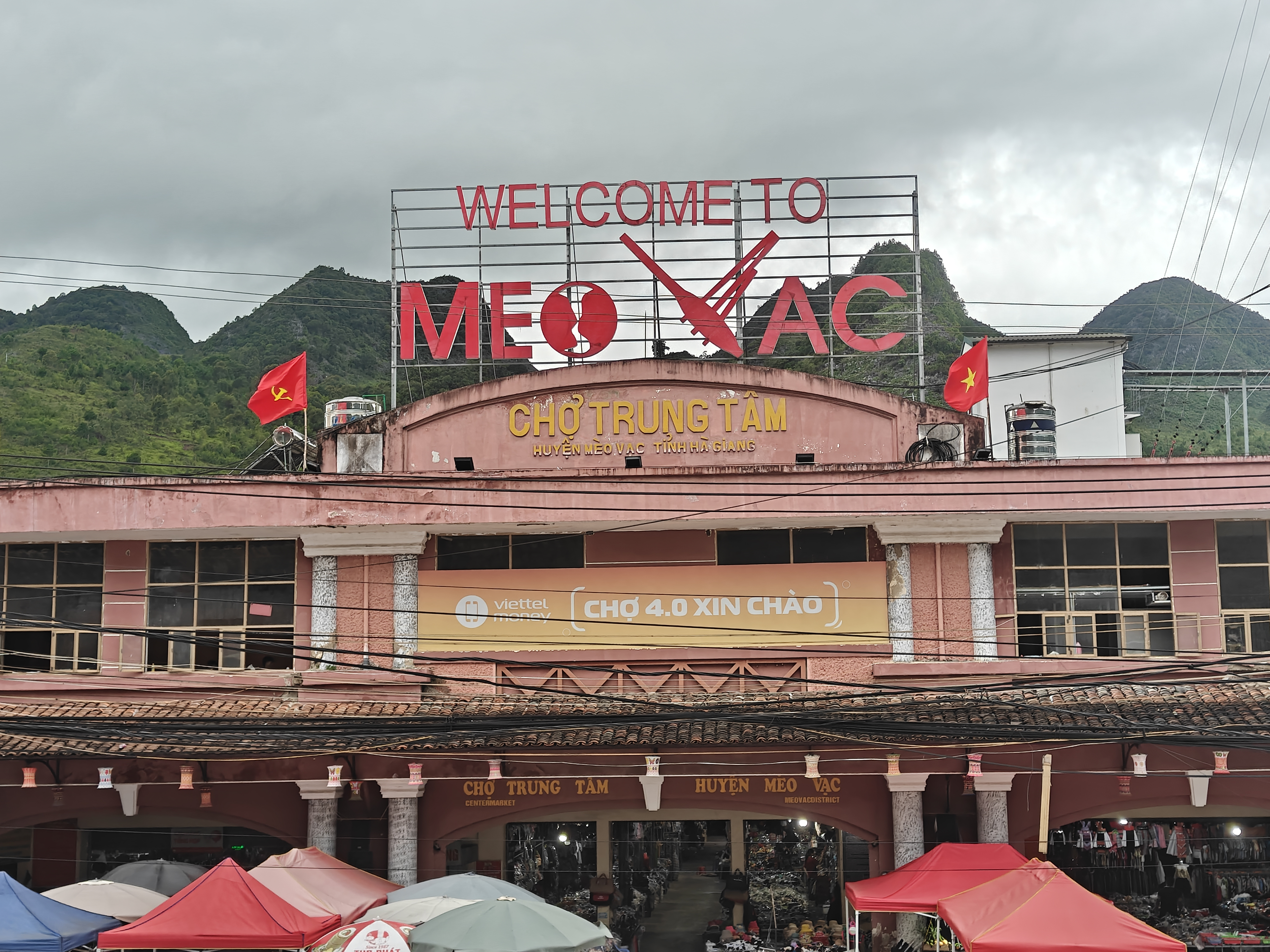
Central Market of Mèo Vạc Commune

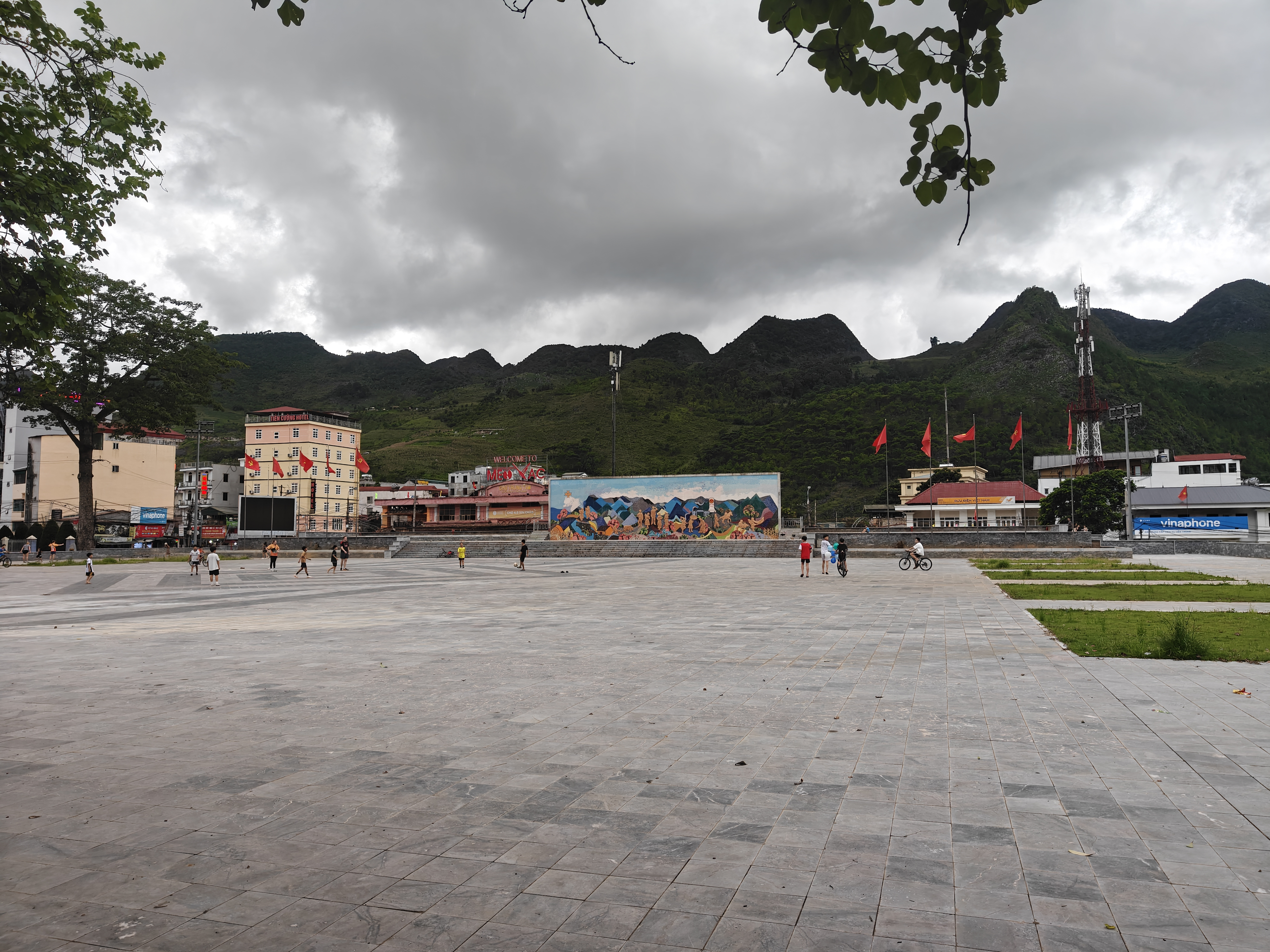
Mèo Vạc Commune Square

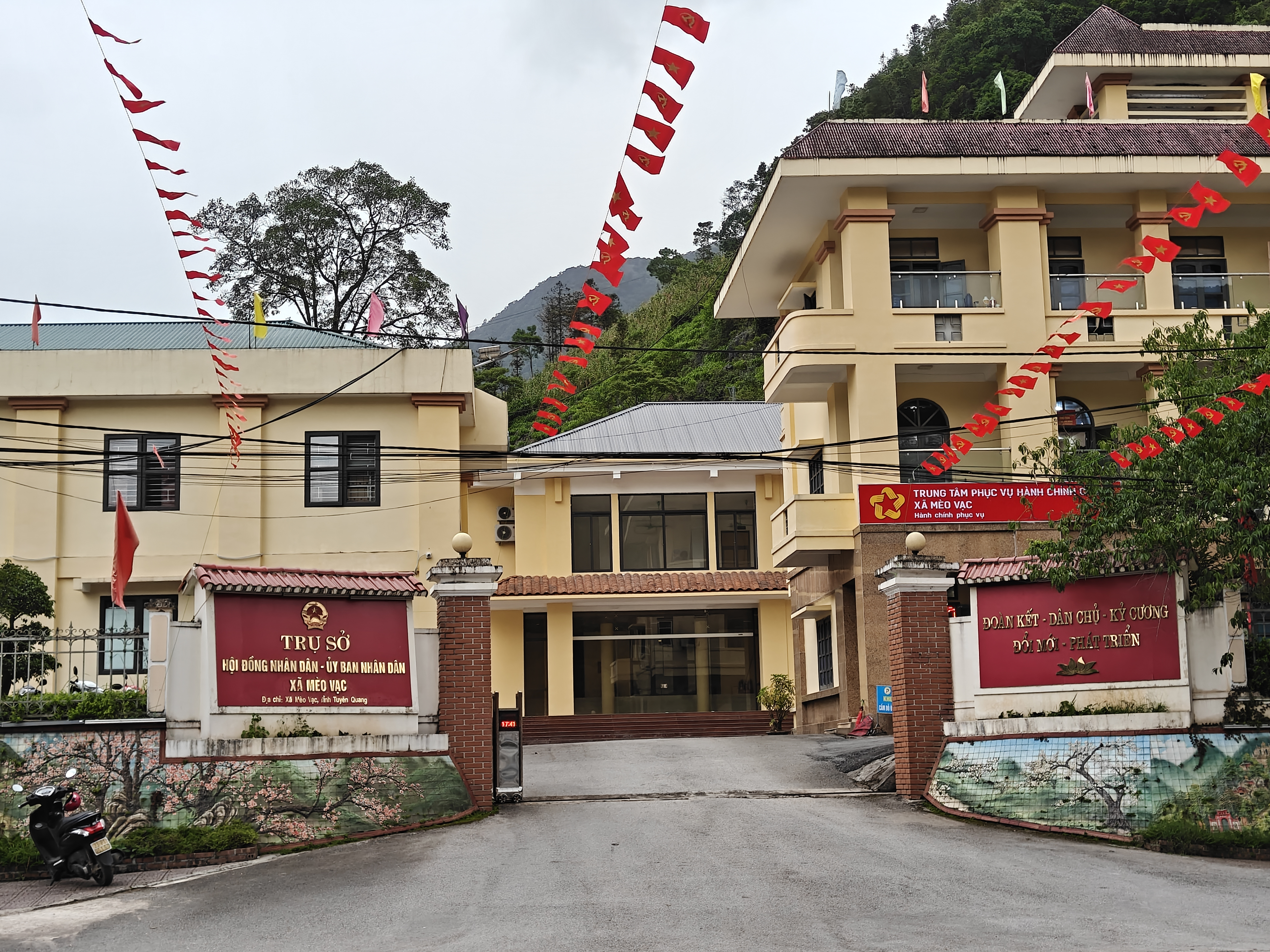
Office Building of the People's Council - People's Committee of Mèo Vạc Commune

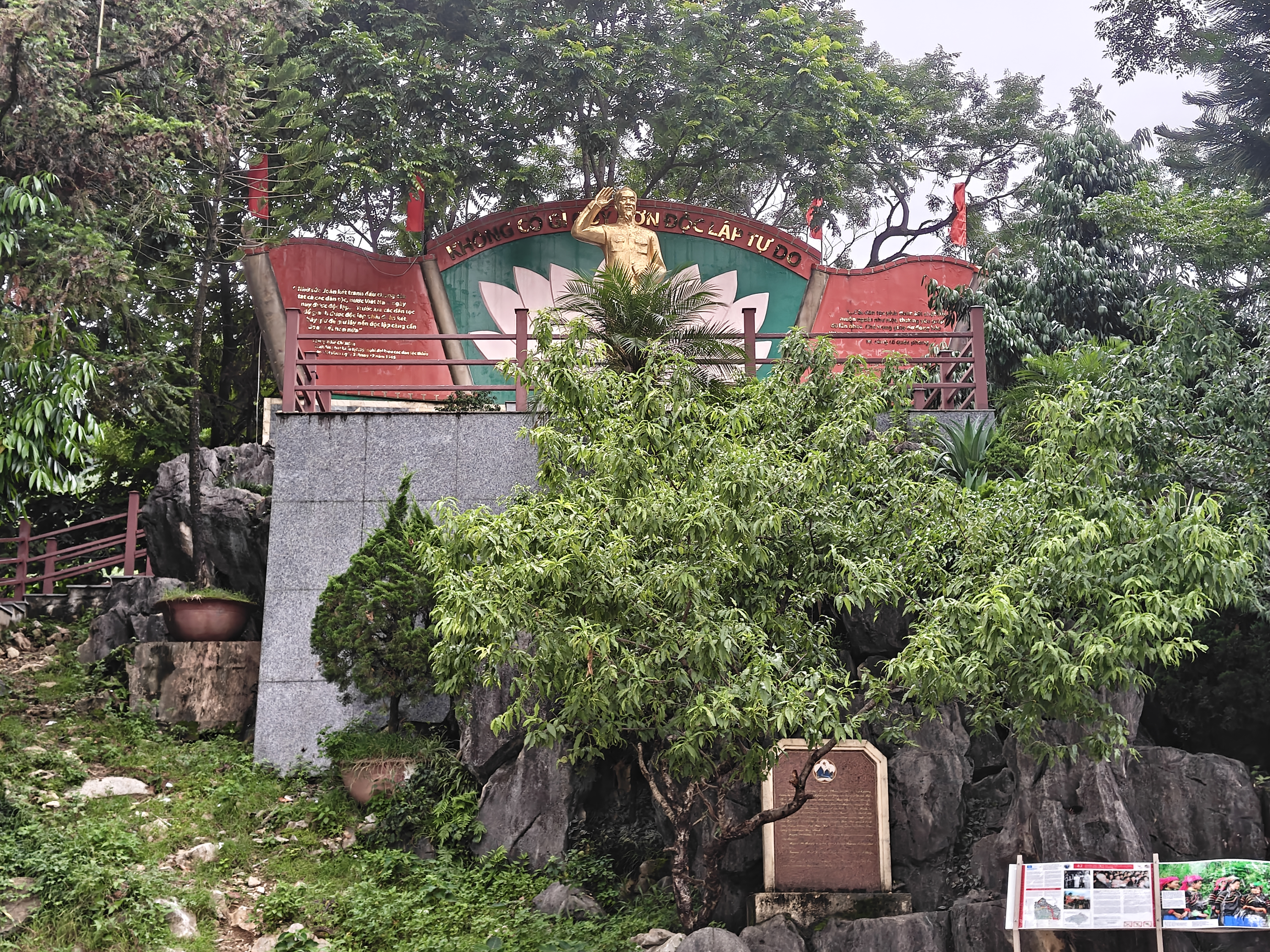
Chairman Hồ Chí Minh Memorial Park in Mèo Vạc Commune, featuring a statue of Hồ Chí Minh.

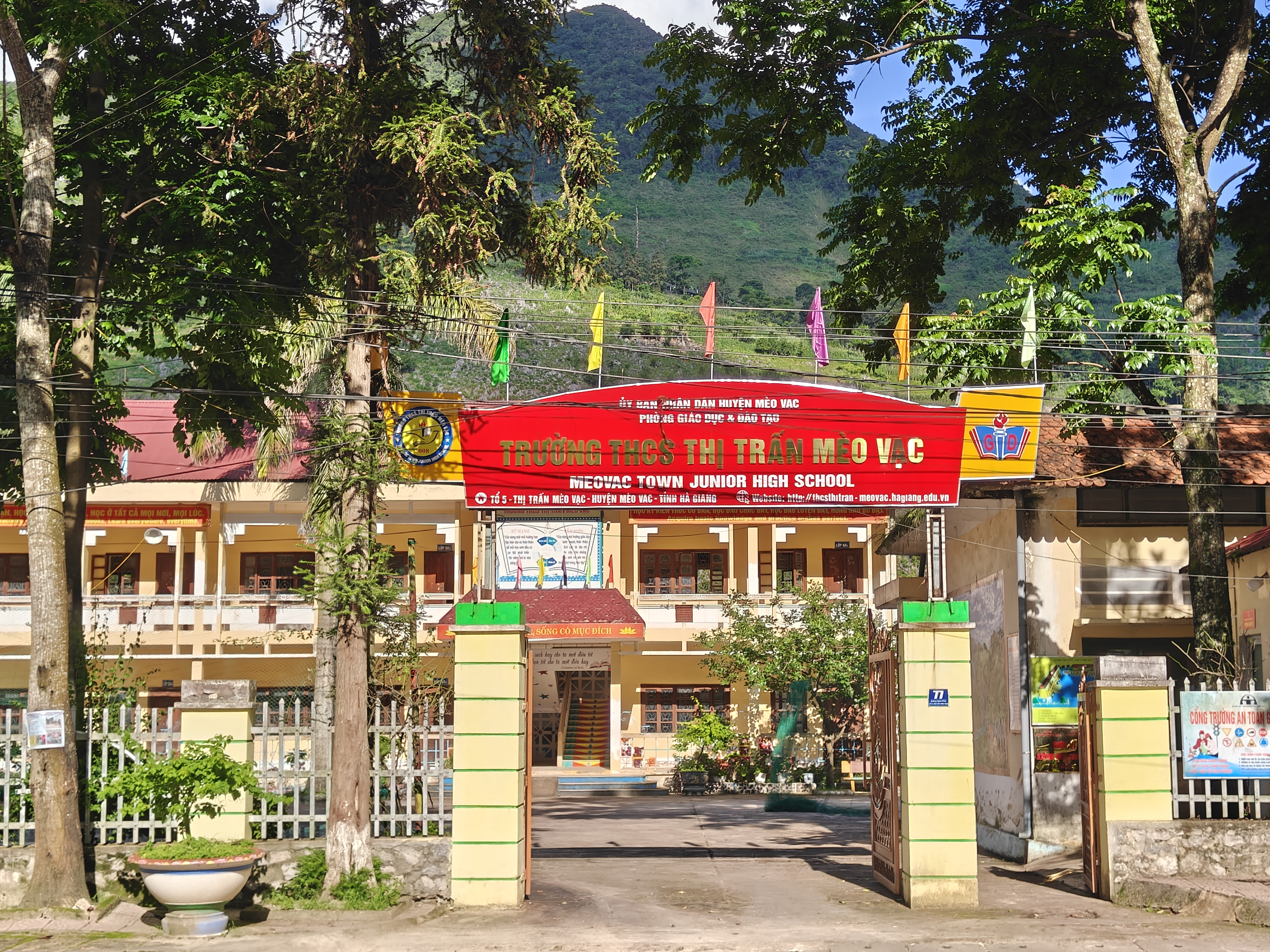
Mèo Vạc Commune Junior High School

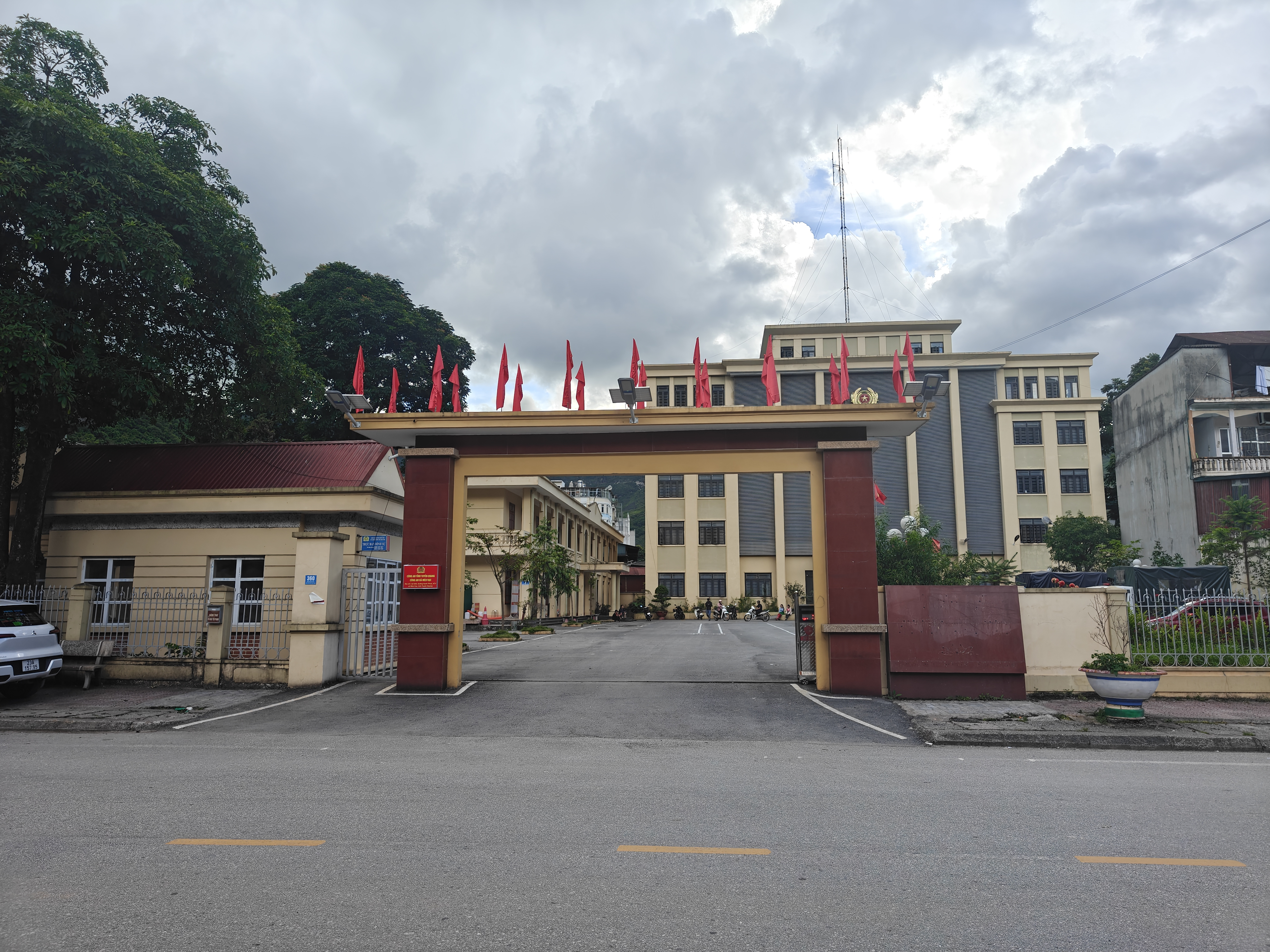
Mèo Vạc Commune Public Security Station

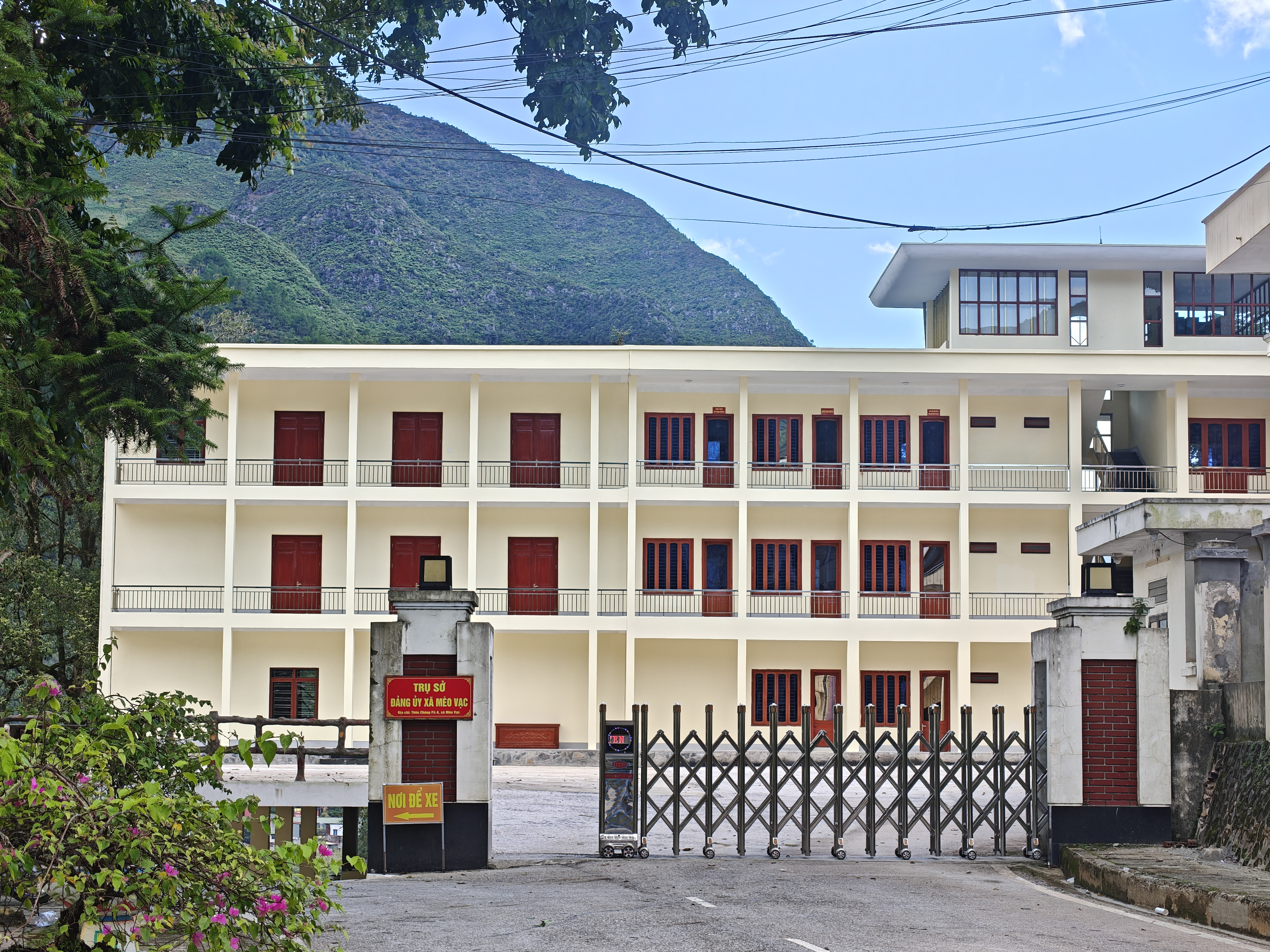
Headquarters of the Party Committee of Mèo Vạc Commune

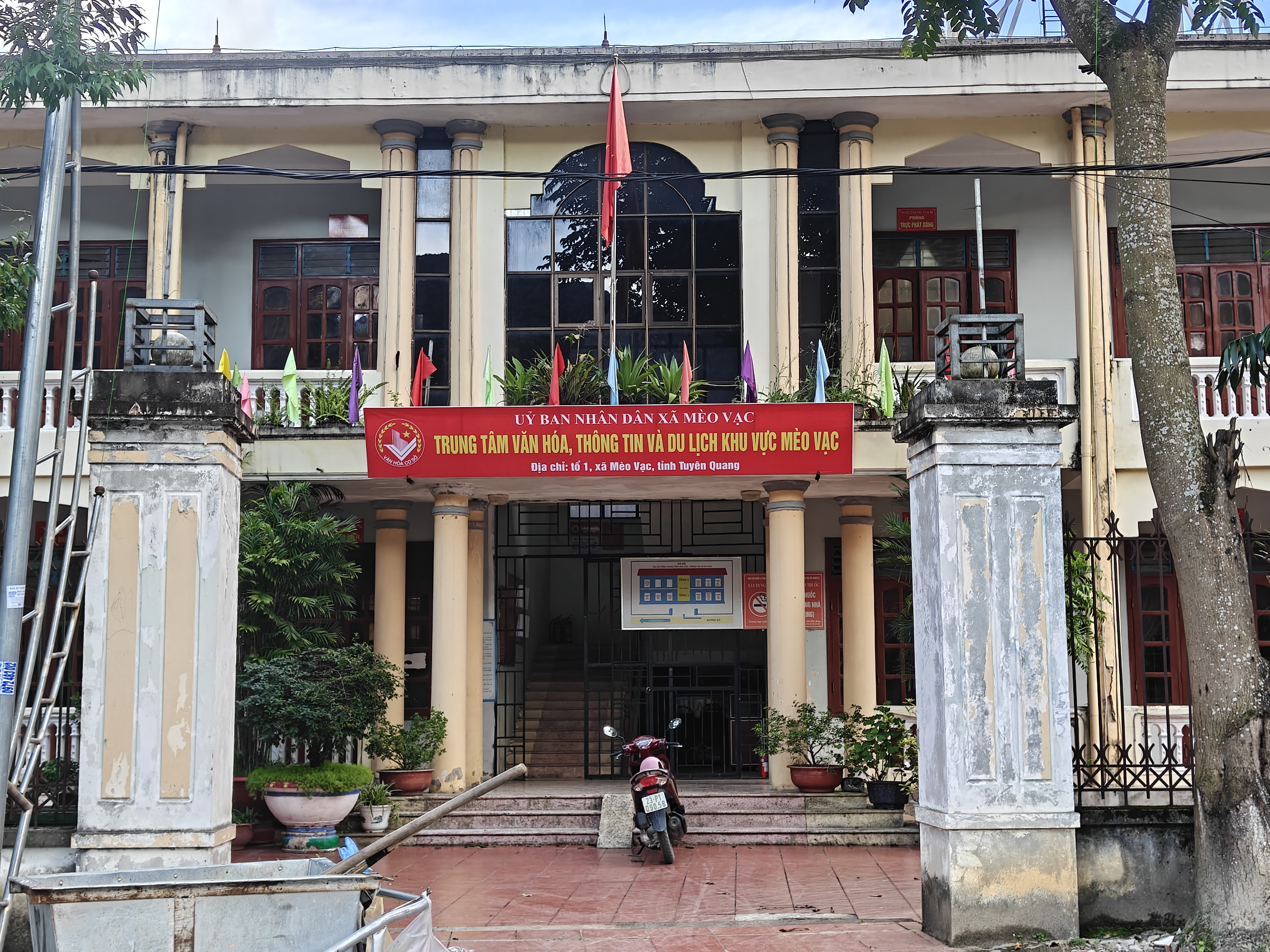
Mèo Vạc Area Center for Culture, Information and Tourism
