= Yên Minh, Tuyên Quang =

Yên Minh Xã Yên Minh
- Commune
- Yên Minh commune
- Location within Vietnam
- Coordinates: 23°07′03″N 105°08′33″E
- Country: Vietnam
- Region: Northeast
- Province: Tuyên Quang
- Time zone: UTC+7 (UTC + 7)

Yên Minh is a commune (xã) of Tuyên Quang Province, Vietnam.
