= Sà Phìn =

Vietnamese commune

Coordinates: 23°15′29″N 105°14′55″E

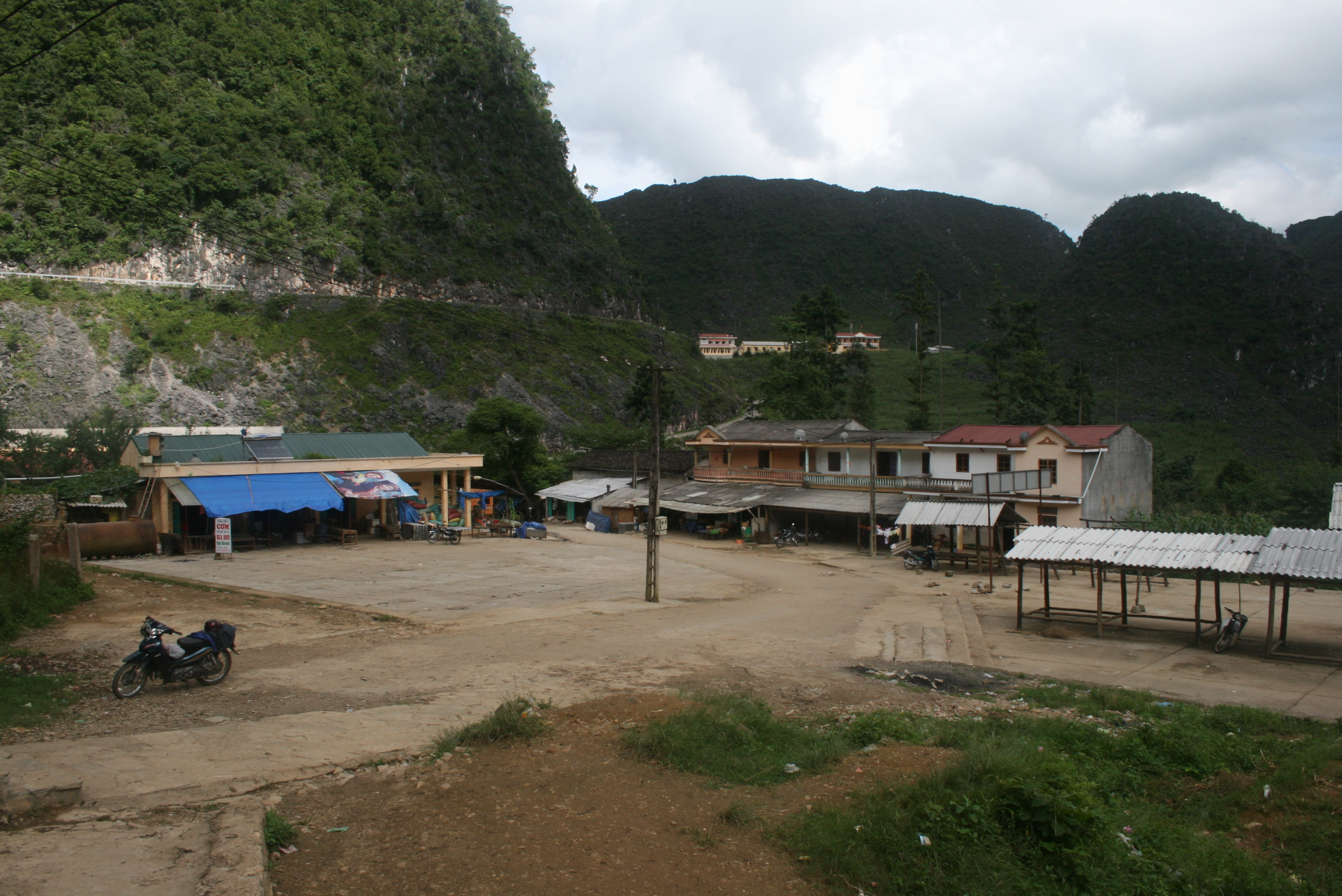
Sà Phìn

Sà Phìn is a commune of Tuyên Quang Province, Vietnam.

It has 2264 inhabitants, most of whom are Hmong.

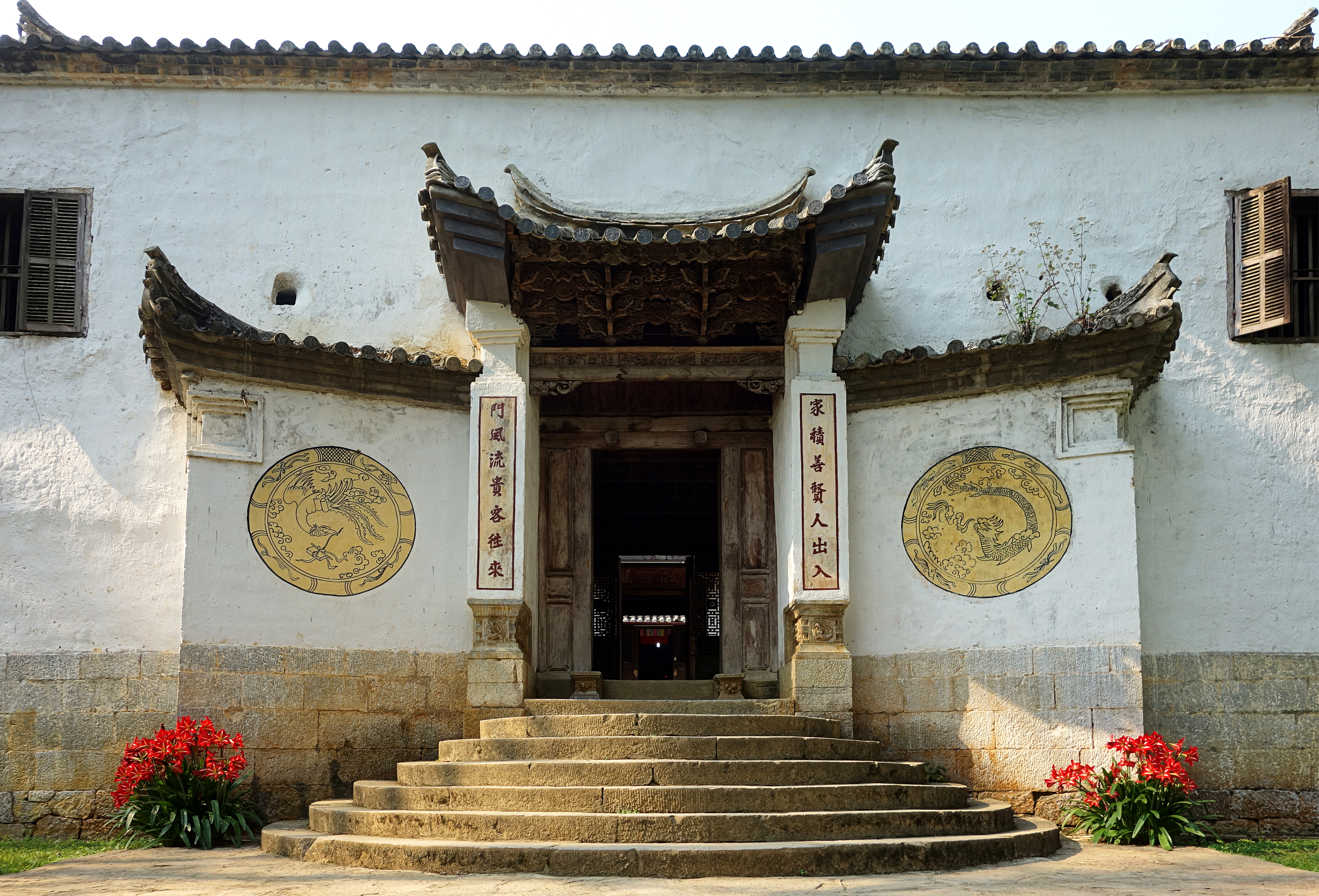
Entrance to the Hmong Lord's house

Sà Phìn was the site of the residence of the Hmong kings of Hà Giang Province.
