= Hà Giang (city) =

- Hà Giang City; Thành phố Hà Giang
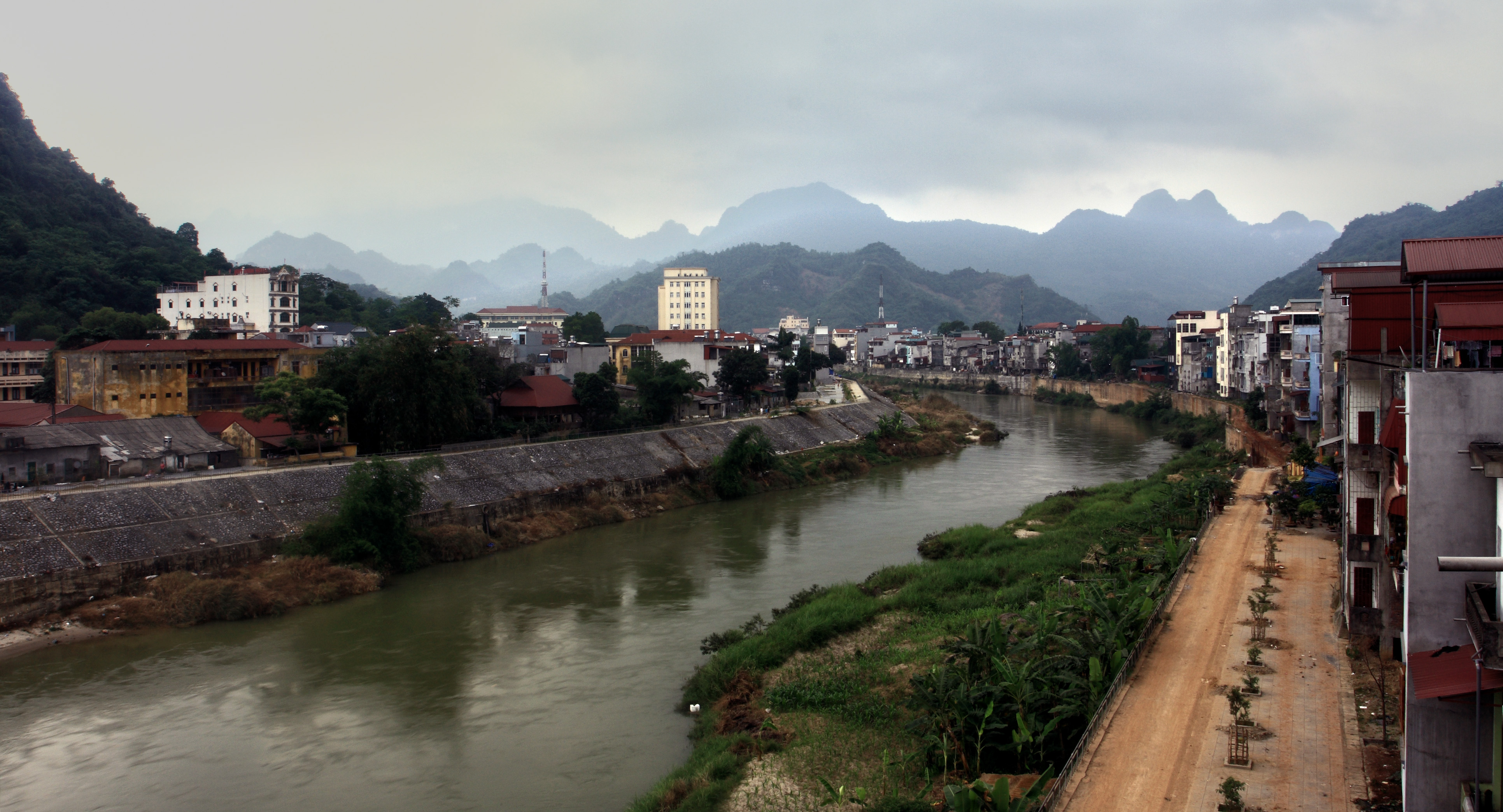

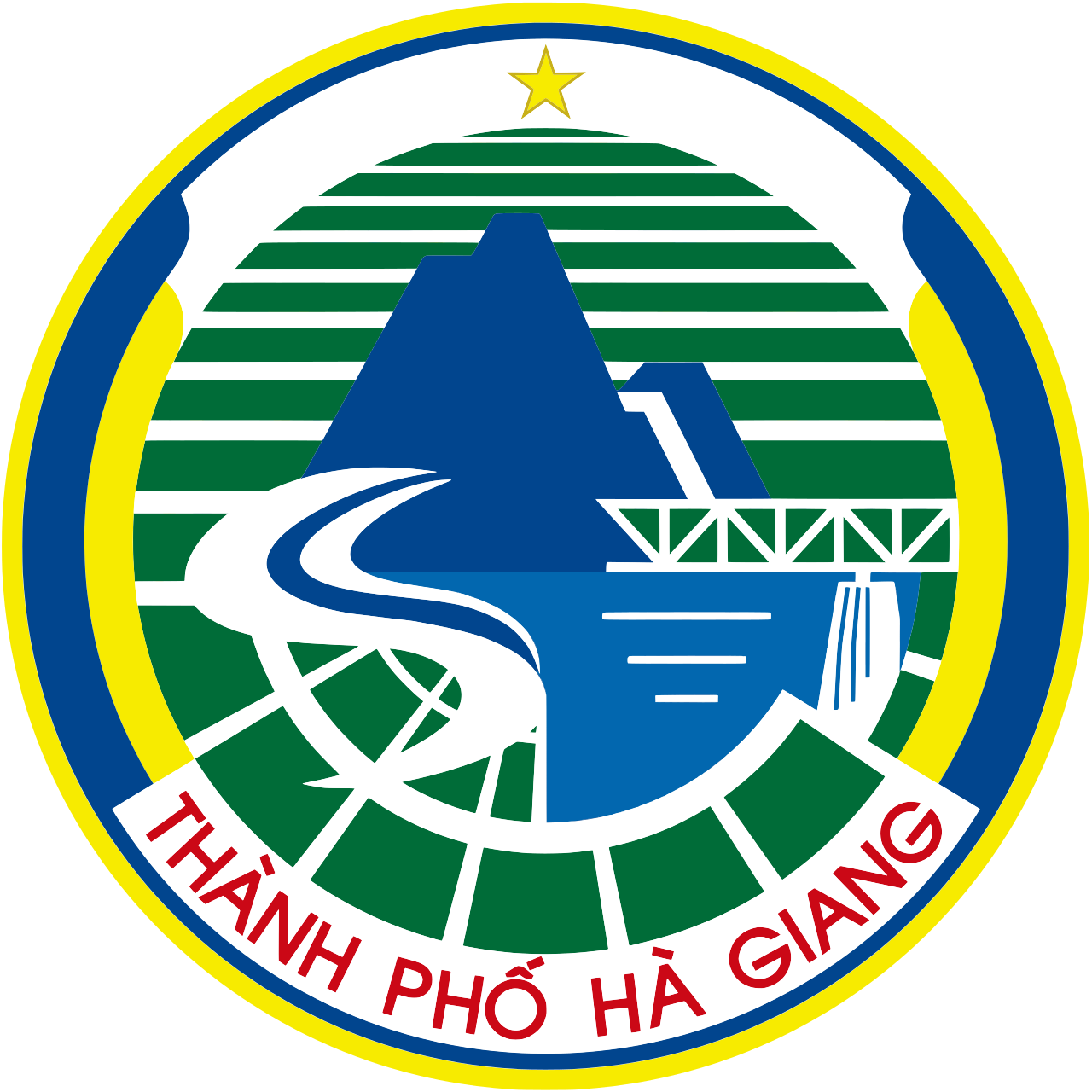
- Seal
- Interactive map of Hà Giang
- Location of in Vietnam
- Coordinates: 22°50′N 104°59′E
- Country: Vietnam
- Province: Tuyên Quang

Area
  - Total: 135.33 km^{2} (52.25 sq mi)

Population (2019)
  - Total: 55,559
  - Density: 410.54/km^{2} (1,063.3/sq mi)
- Climate: Humid subtropical climate

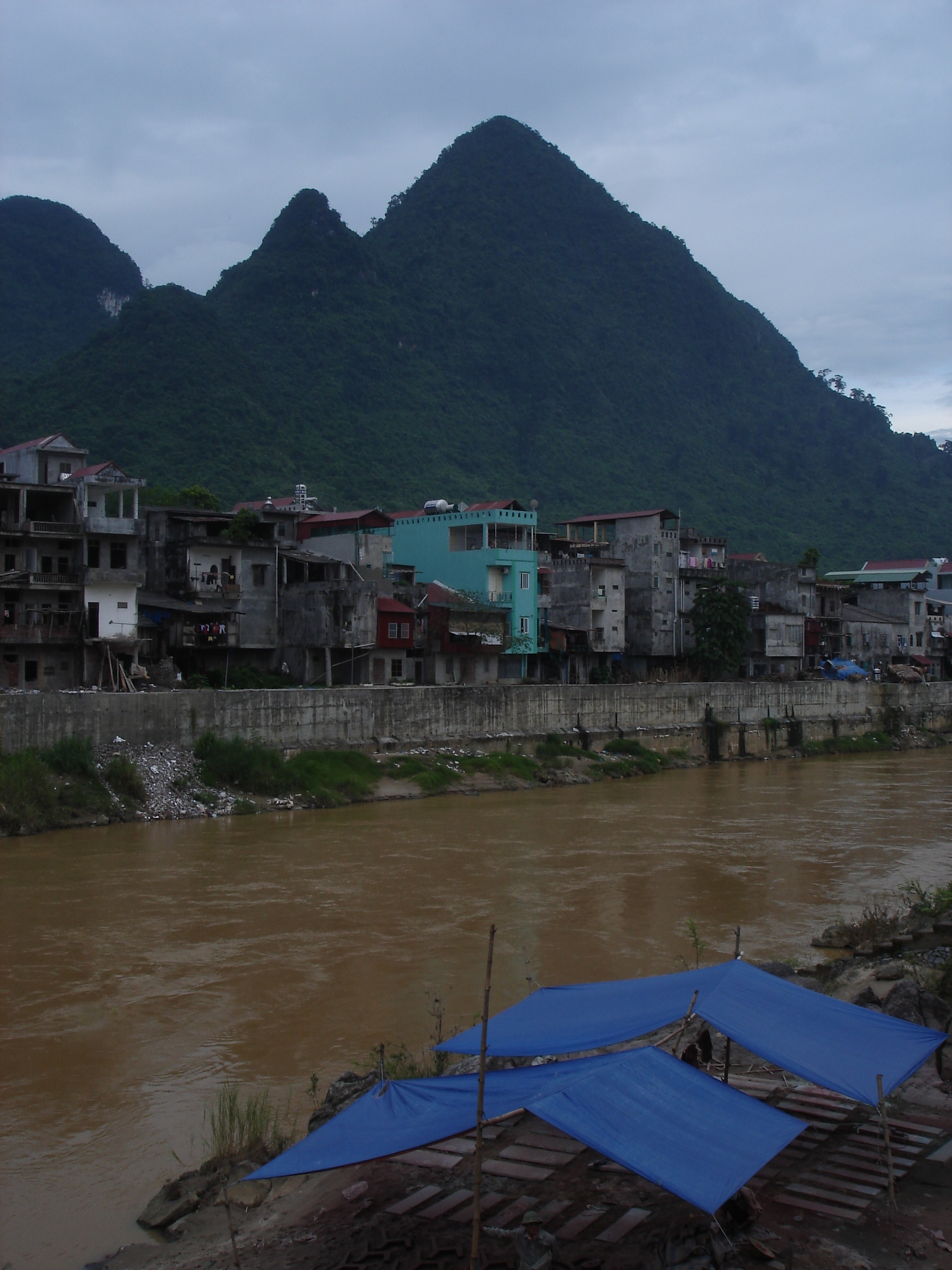
Hà Giang

Hà Giang (Vietnamese pronunciation: [haː2 zaːŋ1],) is a former city located on the banks of the Lô River in Northeast Vietnam. The city has an area of 135.33 km^{2} and had a population of 55,559 inhabitants as of the 2019 census. The population is composed of 22 different ethnicities, of which 55.7% are Vietnamese people (Kinh) and Tày people. The area has been referred to as "the most beautiful place in all of Vietnam".

The city is a popular starting point for circumnavigating the Ha Giang Loop, a route along the QL4C commonly traversed by motorbike that includes Lũng Cú, Lung Cu Flag Tower, Đồng Văn district, Sà Phìn, and Mèo Vạc.

== History ==
Until the 19th century, the settlement of Vị Xuyên, to the south of Hà Giang (chu Han: 河楊), was the principal market town and the largest settlement in the area. Under the Nguyễn dynasty (1802–1945) the town of Hà Giang, in what is now Trần Phú District, began to grow in size. In 1842, the town was included in the former Tuyên Quang Province.

In 1842, Hà Giang was incorporated into the new Tuyên Quang Province, which at that time stretched north as far as the Chinese border. Following the French conquest of the area in 1886, Hà Giang became an important French colonial military outpost. On 13 August 1945, during the August Revolution, the Việt Nam Quốc Dân Đảng took power here.

On August 12, 1991, the province of Hà Giang was re-established and separated from Tuyên Quang Province. When separated, Hà Giang Province contained 10 administrative units, and Hà Giang town became the provincial town of Hà Giang.

On September 27, 2010, Hà Giang town was officially upgraded into a provincial city.

In March 2014, the urban development project type II was approved by the Prime Minister in Decision No. 190, which includes the provinces of Vĩnh Phúc, Hà Giang, and Thừa Thiên–Huế, thanks to a non-refundable aid package from the Asian Development Bank (ADB). With regards to Hà Giang province, the project includes upgrading of roads, construction of 2 new bridges, and upgrading the sewage system.

== Administration ==
The following administrative units are recognized as part of Hà Giang city:

- Trần Phú Ward
- Minh Khai Ward
- Nguyễn Trãi Ward
- Quang Trung Ward
- Ngọc Hà Ward
- Phương Thiện
- Phương Độ
- Ngọc Đường

== Economy ==
Hà Giang Province is a highly mountainous region. Much of the province is too mountainous for agriculture, leaving much of the land covered by forests. Hà Giang's central plateau is good for growing plums, peaches, and persimmons, which the province exports. Tea is also grown.

Hà Giang Province is one of the poorest provinces of Vietnam. Traditionally, the vast majority of its economic activity revolved around agriculture and forestry, but in recent years, there have been attempts to establish a manufacturing industry. Infrastructure in Hà Giang has seen improvement, but remains poor – roads, schools, and health services are less developed than in many other parts of Vietnam. Since the designation of Dong Van Karst Plateau Geopark in 2010, the tourism industry has been growing.

== Demographics ==
Many people in Hà Giang Province belong to one of Vietnam's ethnic minorities. Aside from the Viet (or Kinh), the most numerous ethnic groups in Hà Giang are the Tày, the Dao, and the Hmong.

== Climate ==
Like most of northern Vietnam, Hà Giang has a dry-winter humid subtropical climate (Köppen Cwa).

Climate data for Hà Giang
Month	Jan	Feb	Mar	Apr	May	Jun	Jul	Aug	Sep	Oct	Nov	Dec	Year
Record high °C (°F)	30.3 (86.5)	33.4 (92.1)	35.3 (95.5)	38.3 (100.9)	40.1 (104.2)	38.9 (102.0)	40.0 (104.0)	40.7 (105.3)	39.5 (103.1)	35.5 (95.9)	33.5 (92.3)	31.1 (88.0)	40.7 (105.3)
Mean daily maximum °C (°F)	19.5 (67.1)	21.1 (70.0)	24.3 (75.7)	28.3 (82.9)	31.5 (88.7)	32.3 (90.1)	32.6 (90.7)	32.8 (91.0)	31.8 (89.2)	28.9 (84.0)	25.3 (77.5)	21.6 (70.9)	27.5 (81.5)
Daily mean °C (°F)	15.6 (60.1)	17.2 (63.0)	20.4 (68.7)	24.1 (75.4)	26.7 (80.1)	27.7 (81.9)	27.8 (82.0)	27.6 (81.7)	26.5 (79.7)	23.9 (75.0)	20.3 (68.5)	16.9 (62.4)	22.9 (73.2)
Mean daily minimum °C (°F)	13.3 (55.9)	14.9 (58.8)	17.9 (64.2)	21.2 (70.2)	23.4 (74.1)	24.6 (76.3)	24.7 (76.5)	24.5 (76.1)	23.3 (73.9)	21.0 (69.8)	17.2 (63.0)	14.0 (57.2)	20.0 (68.0)
Record low °C (°F)	1.5 (34.7)	4.9 (40.8)	5.4 (41.7)	10.0 (50.0)	15.2 (59.4)	17.3 (63.1)	20.1 (68.2)	18.1 (64.6)	14.3 (57.7)	9.8 (49.6)	6.5 (43.7)	2.0 (35.6)	1.5 (34.7)
Average rainfall mm (inches)	40.1 (1.58)	38.8 (1.53)	64.6 (2.54)	106.2 (4.18)	294.6 (11.60)	430.2 (16.94)	545.3 (21.47)	414.7 (16.33)	240.9 (9.48)	153.6 (6.05)	84.1 (3.31)	42.2 (1.66)	2,455.4 (96.67)
Average rainy days	11.4	10.4	12.0	14.8	17.9	20.8	24.1	21.5	15.6	13.5	10.1	8.3	180.3
Average relative humidity (%)	84.9	83.9	82.8	81.8	80.5	84.5	85.9	85.7	84.2	84.0	84.1	84.0	83.8
Mean monthly sunshine hours	54.9	56.4	68.0	107.6	158.0	132.5	156.5	172.1	161.4	124.8	108.8	88.9	1,391
Source: Vietnam Institute for Building Science and Technology
