= Hà Giang =

Hà Giang may refer to several places in Vietnam, including:

- Hà Giang province, a former province in Northeast
- Hà Giang (city), a former city and capital of Hà Giang province

== See also ==
- Hà Giang 1, a ward of Tuyên Quang province
- Hà Giang 2, a ward of Tuyên Quang province
