= An Tường =

An Tường Phường An Tường
- Ward
- Interactive map of An Tường
- Location in Vietnam
- Country: Vietnam
- Regions: Northeast
- Province: Tuyên Quang Province
- Established: June 16, 2025

Area
  - Total: 53.44 km^{2} (20.63 sq mi)

Population (2025)
  - Total: 42,952
  - Density: 803.7/km^{2} (2,082/sq mi)
- Time zone: UTC+07:00 (Indochina Time)

An Tường is a ward (phường) of Tuyên Quang Province, Vietnam.

== Geography ==
An Tường Ward located in southern Tuyên Quang Province, and adjacent to:

- Nông Tiến Ward to the north
- Bình Thuận Ward and Nhữ Khê Commune to the south
- Minh Xuân Ward and Mỹ Lâm Ward to the west
- Thái Bình Commune and Bình Ca Commune to the east.

== History ==
On June 12, 2025, the National Assembly of Vietnam issued Resolution No. 202/2025/QH15 on the arrangement of provincial-level administrative units (effective from June 12, 2025). Accordingly, the entire land area and population of Hà Giang Province and Tuyên Quang Province were merged to form a new province named Tuyên Quang Province.

On June 16, 2025, the Standing Committee of the National Assembly of Vietnam issued Resolution No. 1684/NQ-UBTVQH15 on the arrangement of commune-level administrative units of Tuyên Quang Province in 2025 (effective from June 16, 2025). Accordingly, the entire land area and population of Hưng Thành Ward, An Tường Ward and Lưỡng Vượng, An Khang, Hoàng Khai Communes were merged to form a new ward named An Tường Ward.
