= Hạc Thành =

Ward and capital of Thanh Hóa province, Vietnam

Hạc Thành Phường Hạc Thành
- Ward
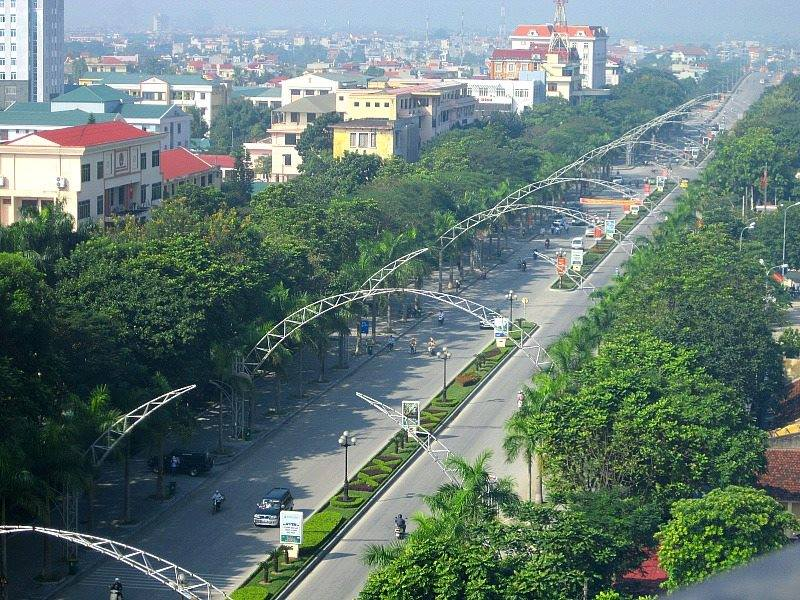
- Lê Lợi Avenue
- Interactive map of Hạc Thành
- Country: Vietnam
- Regions: North Central Coast
- Province: Thanh Hóa Province
- Established: June 16, 2025

Area
  - Total: 24.63 km^{2} (9.51 sq mi)

Population (2025)
  - Total: 197,142
  - Density: 8,004/km^{2} (20,730/sq mi)
- Time zone: UTC+07:00 (Indochina Time)

Hạc Thành is a ward (phường) of Thanh Hóa Province, Vietnam. It is the capital of Thanh Hóa Province.

== Geography ==
Hạc Thành Ward located in eastern Thanh Hóa Province, and adjacent to:

- Hàm Rồng Ward to the north
- Quảng Phú Ward to the south
- Đông Sơn Ward, Đông Tiến Ward and Đông Quang Ward to the west
- Nguyệt Viên Ward to the east.

== History ==
On June 16, 2025, the Standing Committee of the National Assembly of Vietnam issued Resolution No. 1686/NQ-UBTVQH15 on the arrangement of commune-level administrative units of Thanh Hóa Province in 2025 (effective from June 16, 2025). Accordingly, the entire land area and population of Phú Sơn, Lam Sơn, Ba Đình, Ngọc Trạo, Đông Sơn, Trường Thi, Điện Biên, Đông Hương, Đông Hải, Đông Vệ Wards, part of Đông Thọ Ward and An Hưng Ward (Thanh Hóa City) were merged to form a new ward named Hạc Thành Ward.
