= Bình Thuận =

Bình Thuận may refer to several places in Vietnam, including:

- Bình Thuận, Lâm Đồng, a ward of Lâm Đồng province
- Bình Thuận, Tuyên Quang, a ward of Tuyên Quang province
- Bình Thuận, Sơn La, a commune of Sơn La province
- Bình Thuận province, a former province of Vietnam
