= Lũng Cú =

- Commune
- Location in Vietnam
- Coordinates: 23°21′30″N 105°18′48″E
- Country: Vietnam
- Province: Tuyên Quang

Area
  - Total: 35.89 km^{2} (13.86 sq mi)

Population
  - Total: 3,004
- Time zone: UTC+7 (UTC+7)

Lũng Cú is a commune of Tuyên Quang Province, Vietnam. It is located at the northmost end of Vietnamese territory. It is also very close to the Tropic of Cancer as of 2024. Administratively, this sector includes nine villages. It also includes the Lung Cu Flag Tower, marking the border between China and Vietnam.

== Culture ==
Lung Cu commune village retains almost intact many traditional features of the Hmong people such as lifestyle, walled houses with tiled roofs. yin and yang.
