= Nông Tiến =

Nông Tiến Phường Nông Tiến
- Ward
- Interactive map of Nông Tiến
- Location in Vietnam
- Country: Vietnam
- Regions: Northeast
- Province: Tuyên Quang Province
- Established: June 16, 2025

Area
  - Total: 26.99 km^{2} (10.42 sq mi)

Population (2025)
  - Total: 15,393
  - Density: 570.3/km^{2} (1,477/sq mi)
- Time zone: UTC+07:00 (Indochina Time)

Nông Tiến is a ward (phường) of Tuyên Quang Province, Vietnam.

== Geography ==
Nông Tiến Ward located in southern Tuyên Quang Province, and adjacent to:

- Tân Long Commune to the north
- An Tường Ward to the south
- Yên Sơn Commune and Minh Xuân Ward to the west
- Thái Bình Commune to the east.

== History ==
On June 12, 2025, the National Assembly of Vietnam issued Resolution No. 202/2025/QH15 on the arrangement of provincial-level administrative units (effective from June 12, 2025). Accordingly, the entire land area and population of Hà Giang Province and Tuyên Quang Province were merged to form a new province named Tuyên Quang Province.

On June 16, 2025, the Standing Committee of the National Assembly of Vietnam issued Resolution No. 1684/NQ-UBTVQH15 on the arrangement of commune-level administrative units of Tuyên Quang Province in 2025 (effective from June 16, 2025). Accordingly, the entire land area and population of Nông Tiến Ward, Tràng Đà Commune, and the remaining part of Thái Bình Commune after being arranged were merged to form a new ward named Nông Tiến Ward.
