= Ham Rong (disambiguation) =

Hàm Rồng may refer to the following places in Vietnam:

- Hàm Rồng, a ward of Thanh Hóa province
- Hàm Rồng, Cà Mau, a former commune of Năm Căn District
- Hàm Rồng, Lào Cai, a former ward of Sa Pa
