= Hòn Đất district =

Hòn Đất district Huyện Hòn Đất
- District
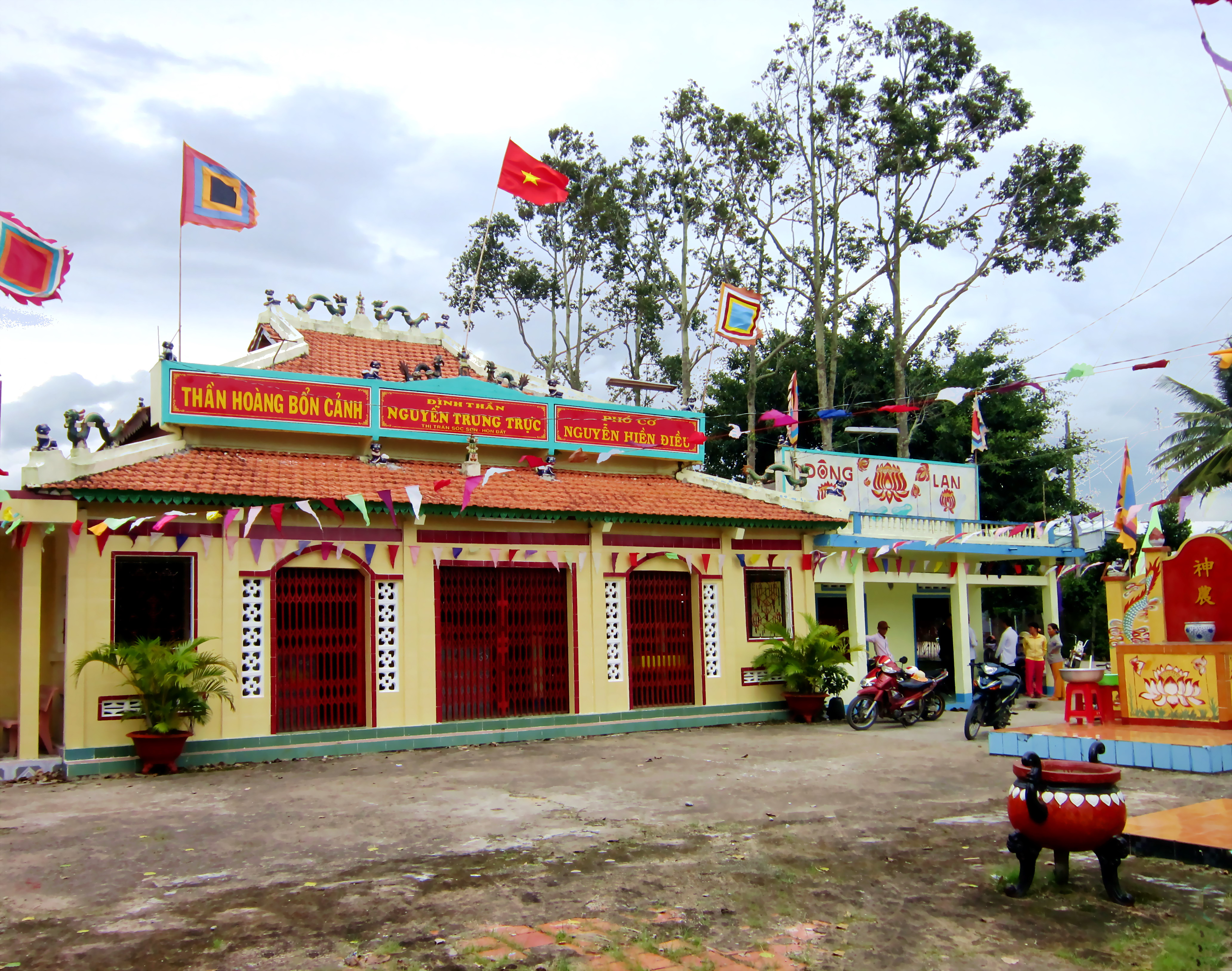
- In front of Nguyen Trung Truc Temple

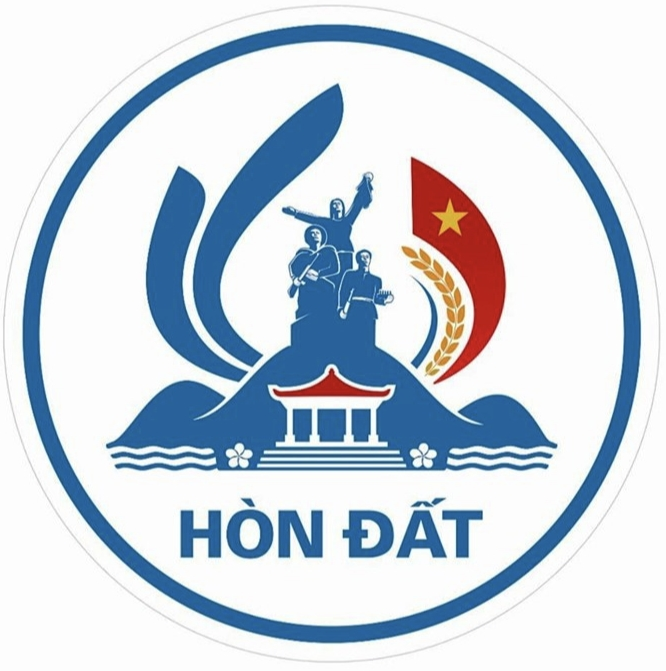
- Seal
- Interactive map of Hòn Đất district
- Country: Vietnam
- Region: Mekong Delta
- Province: Kiên Giang
- Capital: Hòn Đất

Area
  - Total: 397 sq mi (1,028 km^{2})

Population (2019)
  - Total: 172,100
- Time zone: UTC+7 (Indochina Time)

Hòn Đất is a rural district (huyện) of Kiên Giang province in the Mekong Delta region of Vietnam.

== Divisions ==
The district is divided into the following communes:

- Hòn Đất
- Sóc Sơn
- Bình Giang
- Bình Sơn
- Lình Huỳnh
- Mỹ Hiệp Sơn
- Mỹ Lâm
- Mỹ Phước
- Mỹ Thái
- Mỹ Thuận
- Nam Thái Sơn
- Sơn Bình
- Sơn Kiên
- Thổ Sơn

As of 2003 the district had a population of 154,431. The district covers an area of 1,028 km^{2} (397 sq mi). The district capital lies at Hòn Đất.
