= Mường Bám Tower =

Buddhist stupa in Mường Bám, Vietnam

- Location in Vietnam

Religion
- Affiliation: Buddhism
- Province: Sơn La
- Region: Northwest

Location
- Location: Mường Bám
- Country: Vietnam
- Interactive map of Mường Bám Tower
- Coordinates: 21°23′36.3″N 103°23′51.7″E

Architecture
- Type: Stupa
- Completed: 16th century

Website
- Tháp Mường Bám

Mường Bám Tower is a white Buddhist stupa in Mường Bám commune, Sơn La province, Vietnam.

== History ==
The tower was built in the 16th century by Lao people

On 24 October 2012, the Mường Bám Tower was classified as a national monument.
