= Tân Phong =

Tân Phong may refer to several commune-level subdivisions in Vietnam, including:

- Tân Phong, Lai Châu, a ward of Lai Châu province
- Tân Phong, Sơn La, a commune of Sơn La province
