= Sơn Bình =

Sơn Bình may refer to several rural communes in Vietnam:

- Sơn Bình, Bà Rịa–Vũng Tàu, a commune of Châu Đức District
- Sơn Bình, Hà Tĩnh, a commune of Hương Sơn District
- Sơn Bình, Kiên Giang, a commune of Hòn Đất District
