= Đoàn Kết, Lai Châu =

Đoàn Kết Phường Đoàn Kết
- Ward
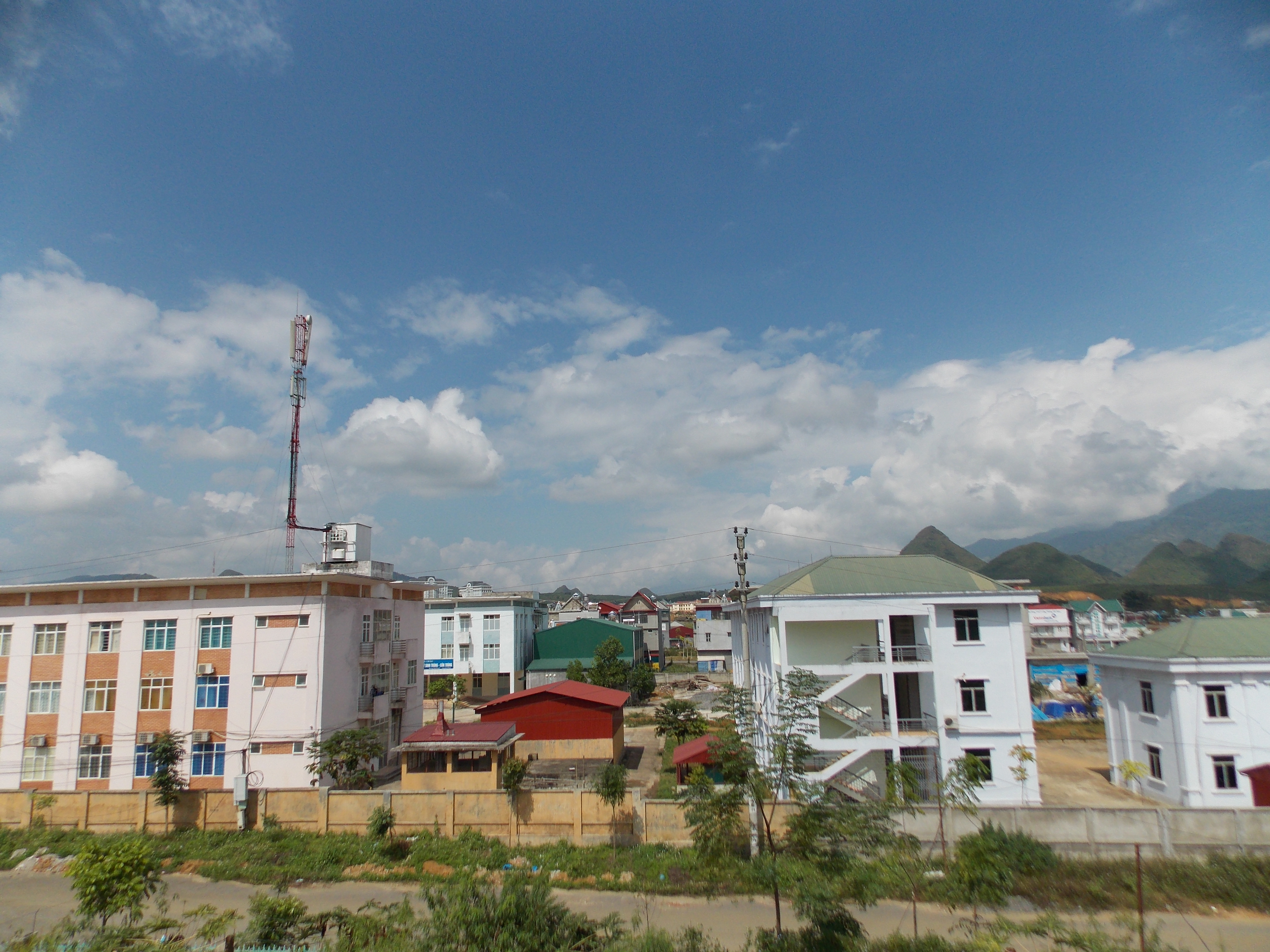
- View of Đoàn Kết Ward
- Interactive map of Đoàn Kết
- Country: Vietnam
- Regions: Northwest
- Province: Lai Châu Province
- Established: June 16, 2025

Area
  - Total: 134.31 km^{2} (51.86 sq mi)

Population (2025)
  - Total: 25,403
  - Density: 189.14/km^{2} (489.86/sq mi)
- Time zone: UTC+07:00 (Indochina Time)

Đoàn Kết is a ward (phường) of Lai Châu Province, Vietnam.

== Geography ==
Đoàn Kết Ward located in central Lai Châu Province, and adjacent to:

- Phong Thổ Commune to the north
- Tân Phong Ward to the south
- Hồng Thu Commune and Nậm Tăm Commune to the west
- Sin Suối Hồ Commune to the east.

== History ==
On June 16, 2025, the Standing Committee of the National Assembly of Vietnam issued Resolution No. 1670/NQ-UBTVQH15 on the arrangement of commune-level administrative units of Lai Châu Province in 2025 (effective from June 16, 2025). Accordingly, the entire land area and population of Đoàn Kết, Quyết Tiến, Quyết Thắng Wards, Lản Nhì Thàng Commune and Sùng Phài Commune were merged to form a new ward named Đoàn Kết Ward.
