= Mỹ Lâm =

Mỹ Lâm Phường Mỹ Lâm
- Ward
- Interactive map of Mỹ Lâm
- Location in Vietnam
- Country: Vietnam
- Regions: Northeast
- Province: Tuyên Quang Province
- Established: June 16, 2025

Area
  - Total: 80.20 km^{2} (30.97 sq mi)

Population (2025)
  - Total: 31,446
  - Density: 392.1/km^{2} (1,016/sq mi)
- Time zone: UTC+07:00 (Indochina Time)

Mỹ Lâm is a ward (phường) of Tuyên Quang Province, Vietnam.

== Geography ==
Mỹ Lâm Ward located in southern Tuyên Quang Province, and adjacent to:

- Yên Sơn Commune to the north
- Nhữ Khê Commune and Phú Thọ Province to the south
- Lào Cai Province to the west
- Minh Xuân Ward and An Tường Ward to the east.

== History ==
On June 12, 2025, the National Assembly of Vietnam issued Resolution No. 202/2025/QH15 on the arrangement of provincial-level administrative units (effective from June 12, 2025). Accordingly, the entire land area and population of Hà Giang Province and Tuyên Quang Province were merged to form a new province named Tuyên Quang Province.

On June 16, 2025, the Standing Committee of the National Assembly of Vietnam issued Resolution No. 1684/NQ-UBTVQH15 on the arrangement of commune-level administrative units of Tuyên Quang Province in 2025 (effective from June 16, 2025). Accordingly, the entire land area and population of Mỹ Lâm Ward, Mỹ Bằng Commune and part of Kim Phú Commune were merged to form a new ward named Mỹ Lâm Ward.
