= Rach Cat Fort =

- Provincial-level Monument
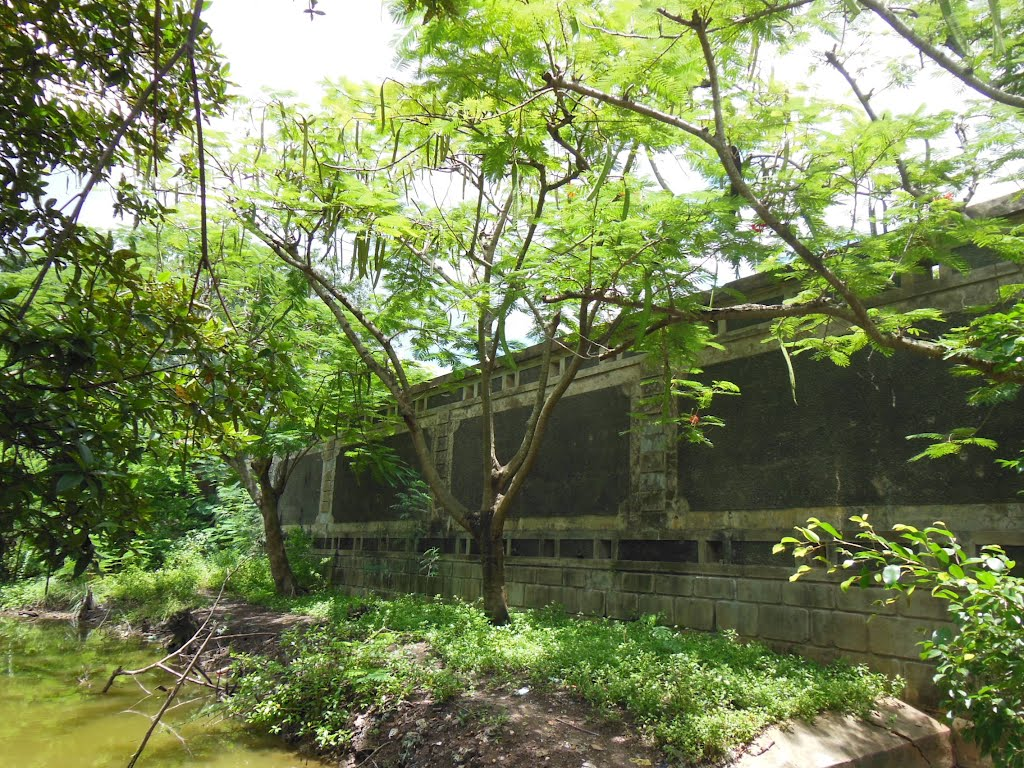
- small A corner of the Rach Cat Fort
- Other names: Rach Cat Fortress; Rach Coc Fort
- Country: Vietnam
- Location: Long Ninh Hamlet, Long Hựu Đông, Cần Đước, Long An
- Nearest city: City of Tân An
- Coordinates: 10°30′21″N 106°43′40″E
- Built: 1903
- Built by: French colonists
- Completed: 1914
- Architectural style: Arched and symmetrical
- Area: 3 ha
- Length: 300 m
- Width: 100 m
- Height: 3 basement floors, 2 above-ground floors
- Wall thickness: 60 – 80 cm
- Construction cost: 7 million francs

Provincial-level Monument
- Type: Historical-cultural monument
- Date of designation: August 26, 1992
- Decree: No. 818/1992/QD-UBND

Rach Cat Fort is one of the largest military fortresses in Vietnam, located in Long Ninh hamlet, Long Hựu Đông commune, Cần Đước district, Long An province, Vietnam.

== Lịch sử ==
On August 15, 1990, the Long An Provincial Military Command applied for a land use rights certificate for the 105 mm artillery unit under its direct management, covering an area of 32,000 m².

On August 22, 1992, the People's Committee of Long An province issued a decision to protect the military architectural monument of Rach Cat Fort. In 2012, Military Region 7 formed a survey delegation.

On March 29, 2017, the Military Command of Long An province advised the People's Committee to issue an official letter to Military Region 7 to invest in and renovate the Rach Cat Fort for tourism purposes.

On May 16, 2017, the Command of Military Region 7 applied to the Ministry of National Defense to implement the policies of the Provincial Party Committee and the People's Committee regarding the investment in and renovation of the Rach Cat Fort to serve tourism and sightseeing.
