= Bình Thuận, Tuyên Quang =

Bình Thuận Phường Bình Thuận
- Ward
- Interactive map of Bình Thuận
- Location in Vietnam
- Country: Vietnam
- Regions: Northeast
- Province: Tuyên Quang Province
- Established: June 16, 2025

Area
  - Total: 46.34 km^{2} (17.89 sq mi)

Population (2025)
  - Total: 18,626
  - Density: 401.9/km^{2} (1,041/sq mi)
- Time zone: UTC+07:00 (Indochina Time)

Bình Thuận is a ward (phường) of Tuyên Quang Province, Vietnam.

== Geography ==
Bình Thuận Ward located in southern Tuyên Quang Province, and adjacent to:

- An Tường Ward to the north
- Nhữ Khê Commune to the south and west
- Bình Ca Commune to the east.

== History ==
On June 12, 2025, the National Assembly of Vietnam issued Resolution No. 202/2025/QH15 on the arrangement of provincial-level administrative units (effective from June 12, 2025). Accordingly, the entire land area and population of Hà Giang Province and Tuyên Quang Province were merged to form a new province named Tuyên Quang Province.

On June 16, 2025, the Standing Committee of the National Assembly of Vietnam issued Resolution No. 1684/NQ-UBTVQH15 on the arrangement of commune-level administrative units of Tuyên Quang Province in 2025 (effective from June 16, 2025). Accordingly, the entire land area and population of Đội Cấn Ward and Thái Khang Commune after being arranged were merged to form a new ward named Bình Thuận Ward.
