= Đông Sơn district =

Đông Sơn district Huyện Đông Sơn
- District
- Interactive map of Đông Sơn district
- Country: Vietnam
- Region: North Central Coast
- Province: Thanh Hóa
- Capital: Rừng Thông

Area
  - Total: 41 sq mi (106 km^{2})

Population (2018)
  - Total: 110,700
- Time zone: UTC+7 (UTC + 7)

Đông Sơn is a former rural district of Thanh Hóa province in the North Central Coast region of Vietnam. As of 2003 the district had a population of 109,819. The district covers an area of 106 km^{2} (41 sq mi). The district capital lies at Rừng Thông.

== Administrative divisions ==
The district is divided into fifteen communes and one township:

1. Rừng Thông township
2. Đông Hoàng
3. Đông Ninh
4. Đông Khê
5. Đông Hòa
6. Đông Yê
7. Đông Minh
8. Đông Thanh
9. Đông Tiến
10. Đông Anh
11. Đông Thịnh
12. Đông Văn
13. Đông Phú
14. Đông Nam
15. Đông Quang
