= Vietnamese heritage sites =

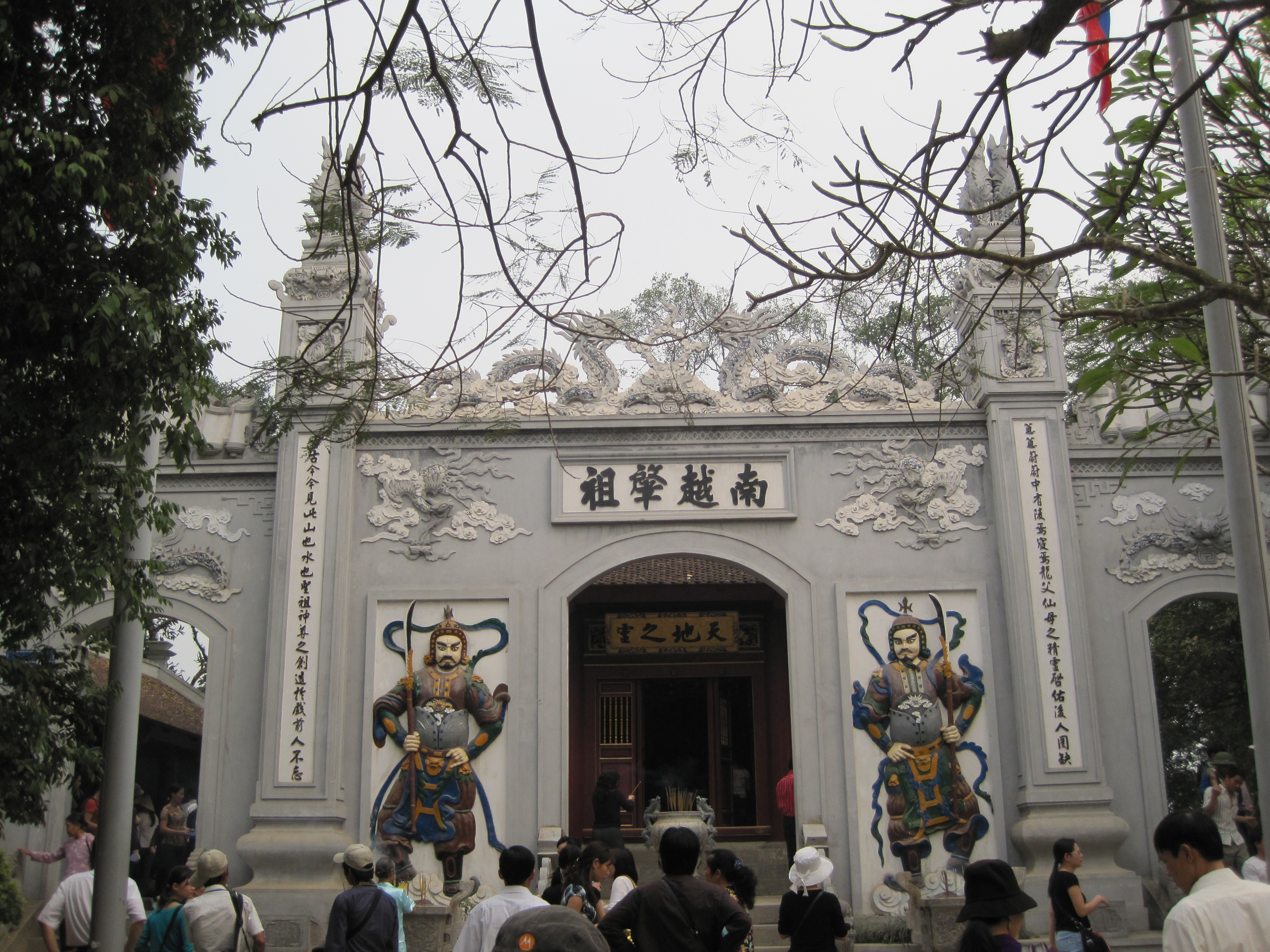
Special national monument: the Hung Temple in Phú Thọ

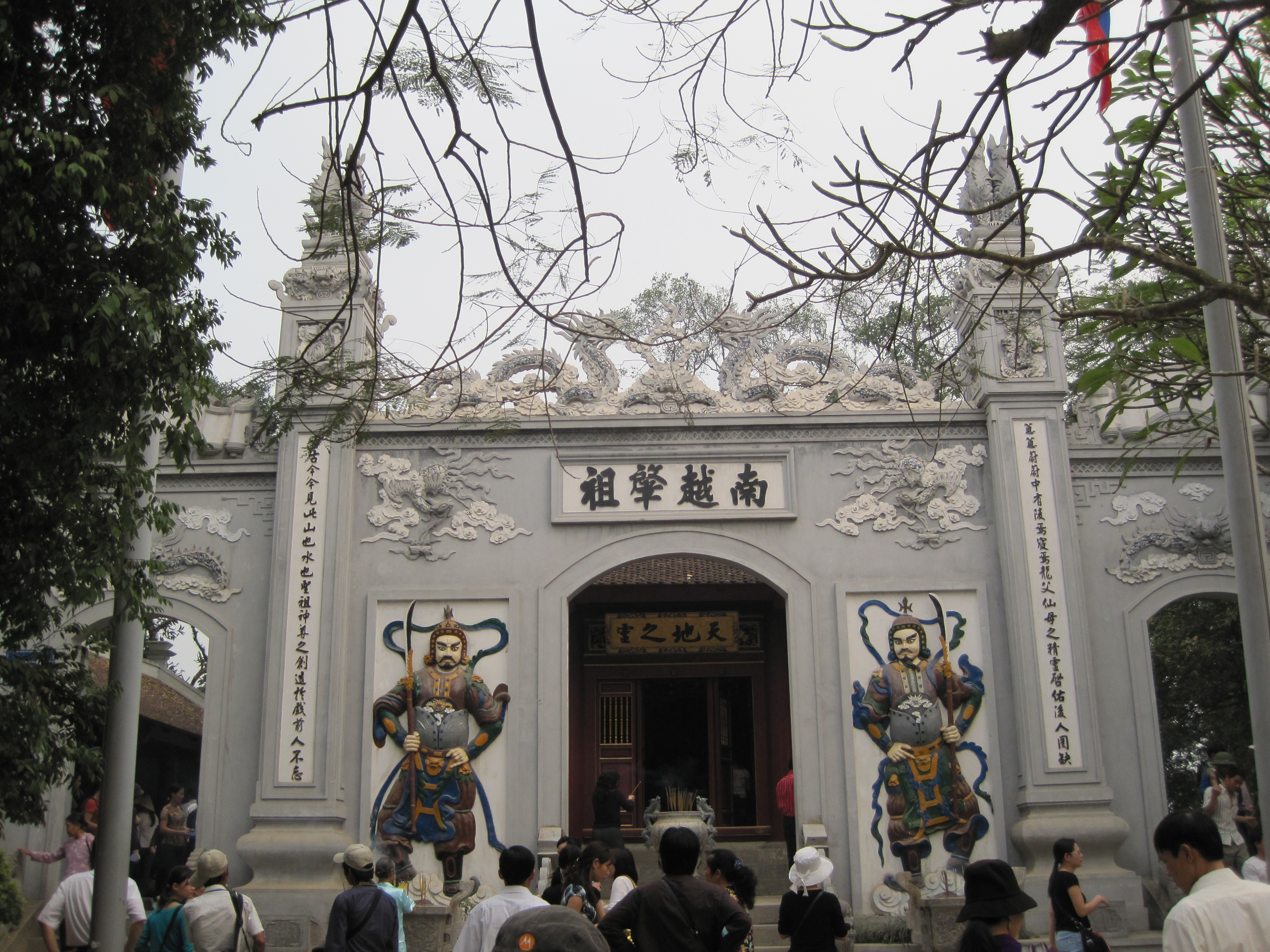
Special national monument: the Hung Temple in Phú Thọ

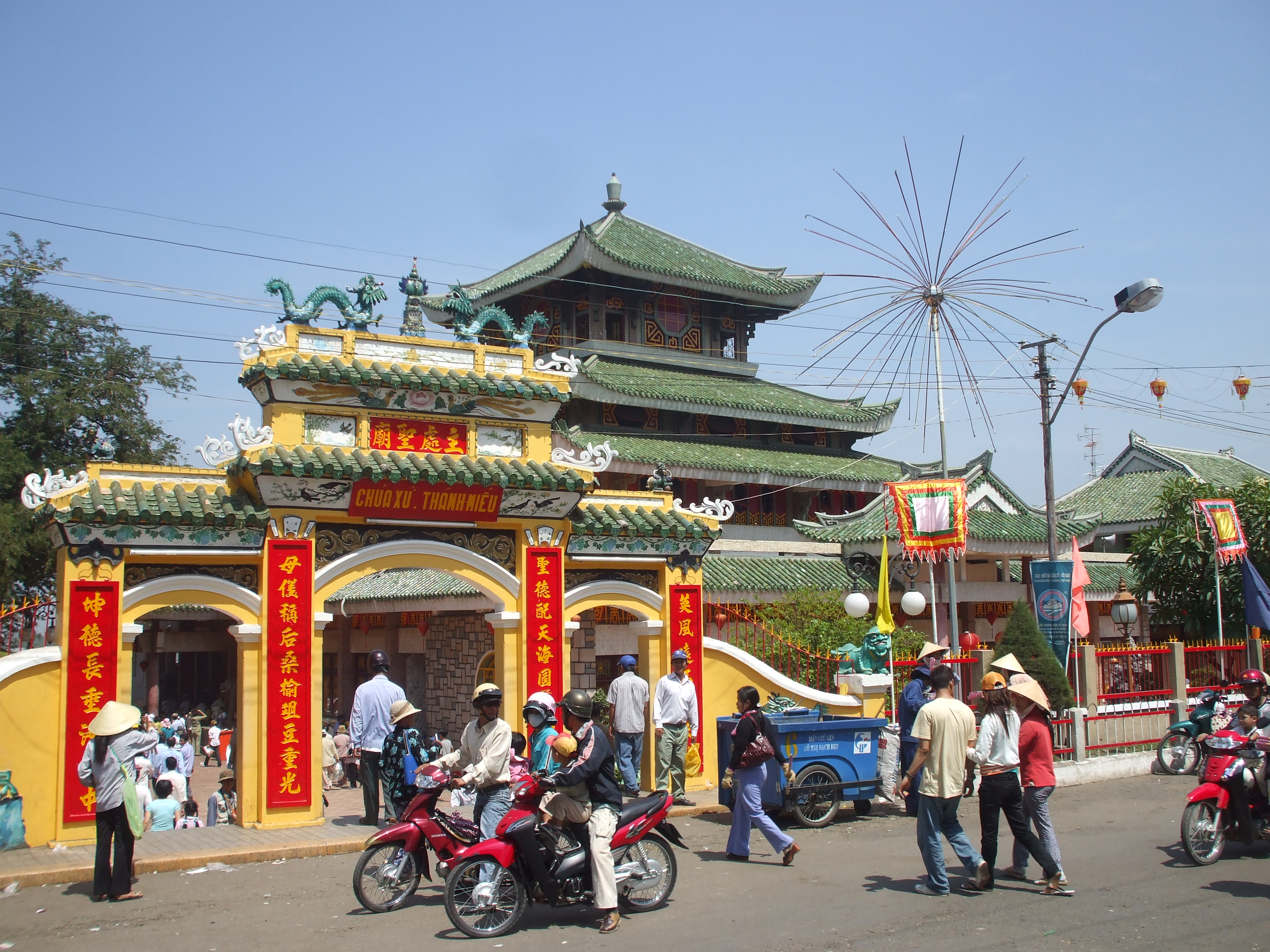
Cultural monument: Miếu Bà Chúa Xứ in An Giang

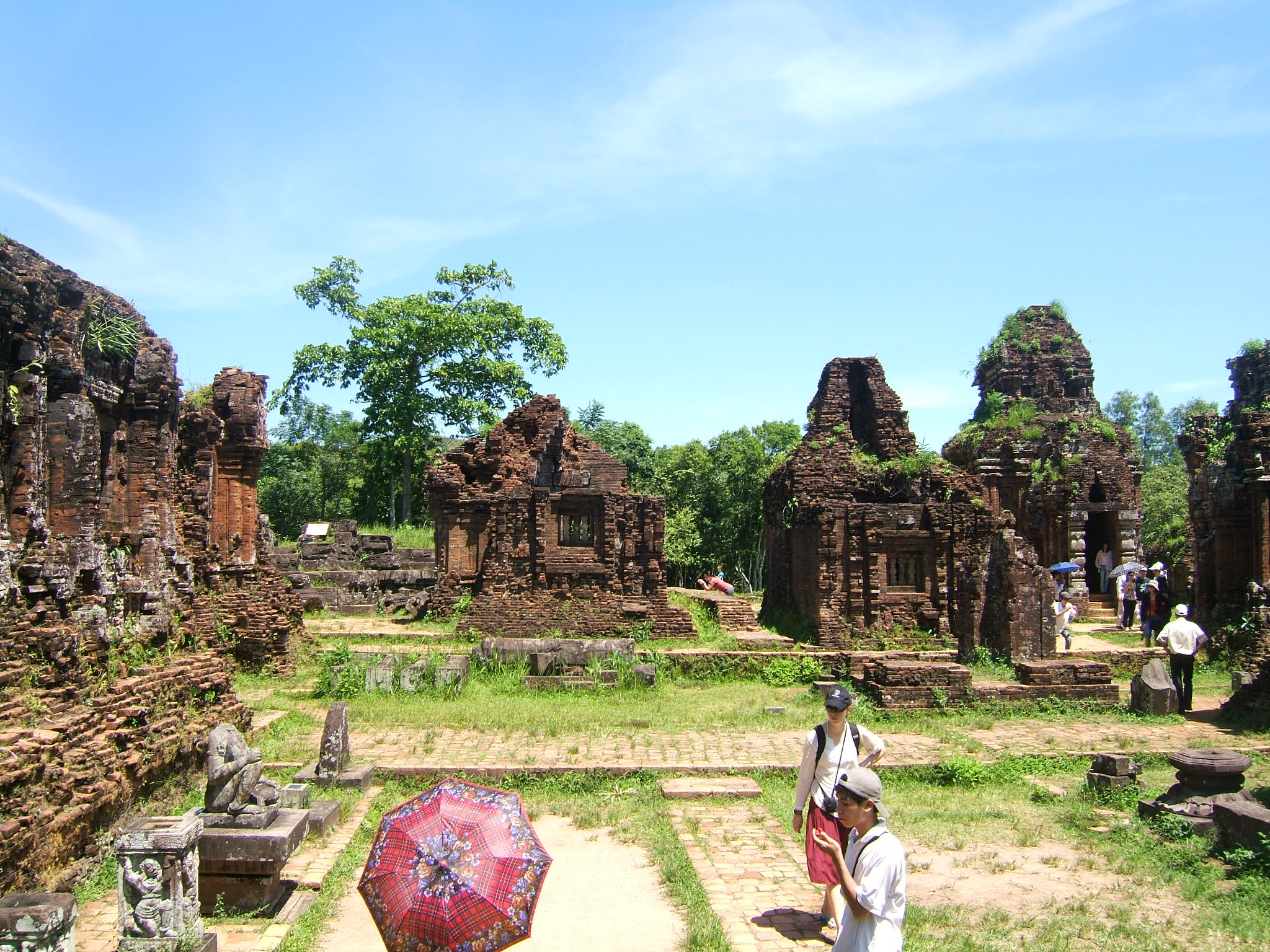
Holy site: My Son Sanctuary

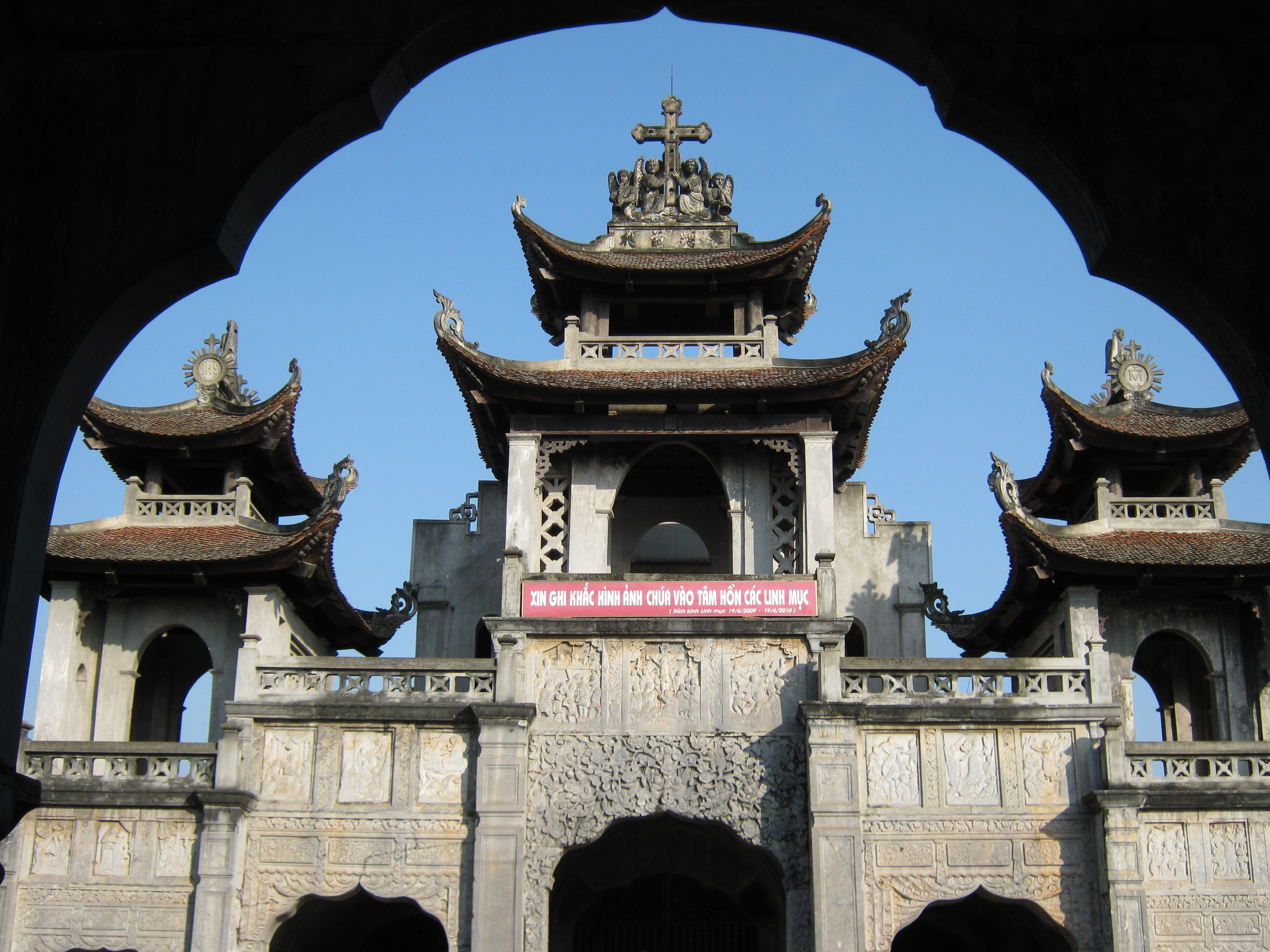
Architectural and artistic monument: the Phát Diệm Stone Church in Ninh Bình

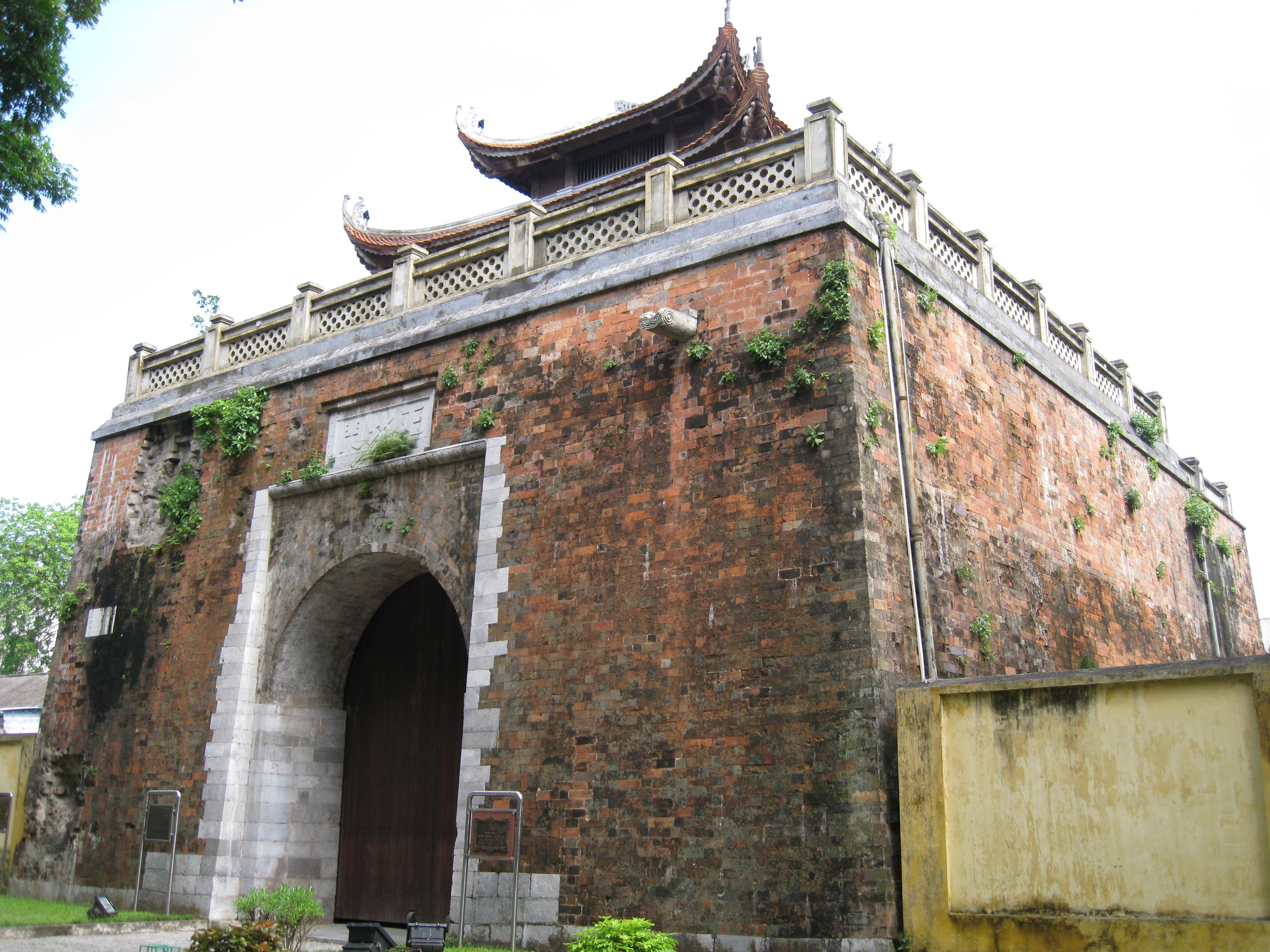
Archaeological monument: the Thăng Long Imperial Citadel in Hanoi

Monuments are traces of the past that remain in the earth or on the surface and have significance in terms of culture and history. In Vietnam, a monument that meets the necessary criteria is recognized in the following order: provincial-level monuments, national-level monuments, and special national monuments. As of 2020, Vietnam has more than 41,000 monuments and scenic sites, including over 4,000 classified as national monuments and more than 9,000 as provincial-level monuments. The highest density and number of monuments are found in the 10 provinces of the Red River Delta (accounting for 56% of the national monuments and 46% of the total monuments). Among the national monuments, there are 112 special national monuments, including 8 World Heritage Sites.

== Statistics ==
=== By region ===
- The provinces with more than 1,500 monuments include: Hà Nội: 5,175 monuments; Thái Bình: 2,539 monuments; Bắc Giang: 2,237 monuments; Bắc Ninh: 1,859 monuments; Ninh Bình: 1,879 monuments; Đồng Nai: 1,800 monuments; Hà Nam: 1,784 monuments; Nam Định: 1,655 monuments; Thanh Hóa: 1,535 monuments.
- The provinces with the highest monument density, all located in the Red River Delta, include: Hà Nam: 2.07 monuments/km^{2}; Hà Nội: 1.56 monuments/km^{2}; Bắc Ninh: 1.96 monuments/km^{2}; Ninh Bình: 1.36 monuments/km^{2}; and Hưng Yên: 1.31 monuments/km^{2}.

No.	Province Name	Number of Special National Monuments	Number of National Monuments	Number of Provincial Monuments	Total Monuments	Last Updated	Notes
1	An Giang	2	26	46	1287	2015	
2	Bà Rịa – Vũng Tàu	1	28	19	219	2019	
3	Bạc Liêu	2	13	34	150	2024	
4	Bắc Giang	5	95	605	2237	2021	
5	Bắc Kạn	2	7	49	120	2021	
6	Bắc Ninh	4	195	386	1558	2020	
7	Bến Tre	2	16	51	69	2019	
8	Bình Dương	0	12	38	500	2015	
9	Bình Định	2	36	78	234	2017	
10	Bình Phước	3	12	12	17	2015	
11	Bình Thuận	0	28	40	300	2019	
12	Cà Mau	0	10	28	38	2017	
13	Cao Bằng	3	27	65	226	2015	
14	Cần Thơ	0	10	12	22	2016	
15	Đà Nẵng	2	18	51	200	2019	
16	Đắk Lắk	2	17	13	58	2019	
17	Đắk Nông	1	7	3	20	2019	
18	Điện Biên	1	12	8	21	2019	
19	Đồng Nai	2	29	24	1000	2019	
20	Đồng Tháp	1	13	50	91	2015	
21	Gia Lai	1	8	5	30	2017	
22	Hà Giang	0	26	29	55	2018	
23	Hà Nam	2	82	101	1784	2018	
24	Hà Nội	17	1196	1156	5175	2015	
25	Hà Tĩnh	2	79	425	504	2017	
26	Hải Dương	4	142	200	3199	2020	
27	Hải Phòng	2	112	356	470	2017	
28	Hậu Giang	1	9	6	188	2015	
29	Hòa Bình	1	41	27	295	2024	
30	Hưng Yên	2	165	88	1210	2019	
31	Khánh Hòa	0	16	171	1091	2017	
32	Kiên Giang	1	21	30	200	2017	
33	Kon Tum	2	4	18	55	2018	
34	Lai Châu	0	5	20	39	2019	
35	Lạng Sơn	2	27	95	581	2018	
36	Lào Cai	0	15	11	50	2015	
37	Lâm Đồng	2	18	16	50	2018	
38	Long An	0	20	86	109	2017	
39	Nam Định	2	81	266	1330	2018	
40	Nghệ An	4	137	235	1395	2018	
41	Ninh Bình	3	103	314	1879	2015	
42	Ninh Thuận	2	12	44	239	2021	
43	Phú Thọ	1	73	218	967	2021	
44	Phú Yên	2	20	68	201	2024	
45	Quảng Bình	2	53	63	200	2019	
46	Quảng Nam	4	60	300	500	2015	
47	Quảng Ngãi	1	28	76	250	2022	
48	Quảng Ninh	8	51	71	482	2017	
49	Quảng Trị	4	21	473	524	2021	
50	Sóc Trăng	0	8	38	111	2021	
51	Sơn La	1	47	15	113	2019	
52	Tây Ninh	1	26	60	365	2016	
53	Thái Bình	2	114	550	2138	2021	
54	Thái Nguyên	1	49	205	780	2019	
55	Thanh Hóa	5	142	686	1535	2019	
56	Thừa Thiên Huế	2	86	55	902	2020	
57	Tiền Giang	2	21	129	106	2024	
58	Ho Chi Minh City	2	56	114	400	2017	
59	Trà Vinh	0	12	16	533	2015	
60	Tuyên Quang	3	137	252	600	2018	
61	Vĩnh Long	0	11	50	700	2021	
62	Vĩnh Phúc	2	66	404	1303	2019	
63	Yên Bái	1	13	92	500	2019	

=== By type of monument ===
- Monuments as Pagodas: According to statistics from the Vietnam Buddhist Church on 26 November 2007, the country currently has 14,775 pagodas and 44,498 monks and nuns.
- Monuments from the Hùng Vương Period: According to statistics from the Department of Cultural Heritage – Ministry of Culture, Sports and Tourism in 2010, Vietnam has 1,417 monuments from the Hùng King era and figures associated with the Hùng Vương period, such as Thần Nông, Sơn Tinh, Thần Cao Sơn, Thần Quý Minh, Thánh Gióng, Chử Đồng Tử,... In the two provinces of Phú Thọ and Vĩnh Phúc, there are over 600 places of worship.
