= Hà Giang 2 =

Hà Giang 2 Phường Hà Giang 2
- Ward
- Nguyễn Thái Học Road
- Interactive map of Hà Giang 2
- Location in Vietnam
- Country: Vietnam
- Regions: Northeast
- Province: Tuyên Quang Province
- Established: June 16, 2025

Area
  - Total: 60.62 km^{2} (23.41 sq mi)

Population (2025)
  - Total: 33,100
  - Density: 546/km^{2} (1,410/sq mi)
- Time zone: UTC+07:00 (Indochina Time)

Hà Giang 2 is a ward (phường) of Tuyên Quang Province, Vietnam.

== Geography ==
Hà Giang 2 Ward located in northern Tuyên Quang Province, and adjacent to:

- Minh Tân Commune and Thuận Hòa Commune to the north
- Hà Giang 1 Ward and Phú Linh Commune to the south
- Thanh Thủy Commune to the west
- Ngọc Đường Commune to the east.

== History ==
On June 12, 2025, the National Assembly of Vietnam issued Resolution No. 202/2025/QH15 on the arrangement of provincial-level administrative units (effective from June 12, 2025). Accordingly, the entire land area and population of Hà Giang Province and Tuyên Quang Province were merged to form a new province named Tuyên Quang Province.

On June 16, 2025, the Standing Committee of the National Assembly of Vietnam issued Resolution No. 1684/NQ-UBTVQH15 on the arrangement of commune-level administrative units of Tuyên Quang Province in 2025 (effective from June 16, 2025). Accordingly, the entire land area and population of Ngọc Hà, Trần Phú, Minh Khai Wards, the remaining part of Quang Trung Ward after being arranged, and Phong Quang Commune were merged to form a new ward named Hà Giang 2 Ward.
