= Minh Xuân =

Minh Xuân Phường Minh Xuân
- Ward
- Department of Industry and Trade of Tuyên Quang Province
- Interactive map of Minh Xuân
- Location in Vietnam
- Country: Vietnam
- Regions: Northeast
- Province: Tuyên Quang Province
- Established: June 16, 2025

Area
  - Total: 34.90 km^{2} (13.47 sq mi)

Population (2025)
  - Total: 72,000
  - Density: 2,100/km^{2} (5,300/sq mi)
- Time zone: UTC+07:00 (Indochina Time)

Minh Xuân is a ward (phường) of Tuyên Quang Province, Vietnam. It is the capital of Tuyên Quang Province.

== Geography ==
Minh Xuân Ward located in southern Tuyên Quang Province, and adjacent to:

- Yên Sơn Commune to the north
- An Tường Ward to the south
- Mỹ Lâm Ward to the west
- Nông Tiến Ward to the east.

== History ==
On June 12, 2025, the National Assembly of Vietnam issued Resolution No. 202/2025/QH15 on the arrangement of provincial-level administrative units (effective from June 12, 2025). Accordingly, the entire land area and population of Hà Giang Province and Tuyên Quang Province were merged to form a new province named Tuyên Quang Province.

On June 16, 2025, the Standing Committee of the National Assembly of Vietnam issued Resolution No. 1684/NQ-UBTVQH15 on the arrangement of commune-level administrative units of Tuyên Quang Province in 2025 (effective from June 16, 2025). Accordingly, the entire land area and population of Ỷ La, Tân Hà, Phan Thiết, Minh Xuân, Tân Quang Wards, Trung Môn Commune, and the remaining part of Kim Phú Commune after being arranged were merged to form a new ward named Minh Xuân Ward.
