= Hà Giang 1 =

Hà Giang 1 Phường Hà Giang 1
- Ward
- Former Hà Giang Provincial Party Committee
- Interactive map of Hà Giang 1
- Location in Vietnam
- Country: Vietnam
- Regions: Northeast
- Province: Tuyên Quang Province
- Established: June 16, 2025

Area
  - Total: 82.69 km^{2} (31.93 sq mi)

Population (2025)
  - Total: 21,652
  - Density: 261.8/km^{2} (678.2/sq mi)
- Time zone: UTC+07:00 (Indochina Time)

Hà Giang 1 is a ward (phường) of Tuyên Quang Province, Vietnam.

== Geography ==
Hà Giang 1 Ward located in northern Tuyên Quang Province, and adjacent to:

- Hà Giang 2 Ward to the north
- Cao Bồ Commune and Vị Xuyên Commune to the south
- Thanh Thủy Commune to the west
- Phú Linh Commune to the east.

== History ==
On June 12, 2025, the National Assembly of Vietnam issued Resolution No. 202/2025/QH15 on the arrangement of provincial-level administrative units (effective from June 12, 2025). Accordingly, the entire land area and population of Hà Giang Province and Tuyên Quang Province were merged to form a new province named Tuyên Quang Province.

On June 16, 2025, the Standing Committee of the National Assembly of Vietnam issued Resolution No. 1684/NQ-UBTVQH15 on the arrangement of commune-level administrative units of Tuyên Quang Province in 2025 (effective from June 16, 2025). Accordingly, the entire land area and population of Nguyễn Trãi Ward, Phương Thiện Commune, Phương Độ Commune and part of Quang Trung Ward were merged to form a new ward named Hà Giang 1 Ward.
