= Đông Quang =

- Ward
- Country: Vietnam
- Province: Thanh Hóa
- Time zone: UTC+07:00 (Indochina Time)

Đông Quang is a ward (xã) of Thanh Hóa Province, Vietnam.

== History ==
During the Nguyễn dynasty, Đông Quang commune belonged to Đông Sơn district, Thieu Hoa "phủ", and consisted of the following villages: Văn Ba, Đồng Đức Thịnh Trị, Đôi Dọ, and Quang Vinh và Thạch Thất.

The Đông Sơn Commune was named in 1953.

In 1977, Chu River right bank communes of Thieu Hoa district merged with the Đông Sơn districts to established Dong Thieu District. Đông Quang commune belonged the Dong Thieu district.

In 1982, Dong Thieu District changed into Đông Sơn District, and Đông Quang commune returned to Đông Sơn. Đông Quang's villages today include Quang Vinh, Minh Thành, Đức Thắng, divided 12 small villages from 1 to 12.

== Location ==
Đông Quang commune has the area of 7.38 square kilometres (2.85 mi^{2}). According to reported Census population in 1999, Đông Quang commune has the population of 5,166.

- North bordering Dong Son Ward
- East bordering Hac Thanh and Quang Phu Wards
- South bordering Quang Yen and Trung Chinh Communes
- West bordering Dong Tien Commune.

Dong Quang Ward has a natural area of 48.60 km², a population size of 61,214 people in 2024, population density reaching 1,260 people/km².
