= Hồng Thái =

Hồng Thái may refer to:

== Place names ==
- Hồng Thái, Hanoi, a rural commune of Phú Xuyên District
- Hồng Thái, Haiphong, a rural commune of An Dương District
- Hồng Thái, Bắc Giang, a rural commune of Việt Yên town
- Hồng Thái, Bình Thuận, a rural commune of Bắc Bình District
- Hồng Thái, Bình Gia, a rural commune of Bình Gia District, Lạng Sơn Province
- Hồng Thái, Văn Lãng, a rural commune of Văn Lãng District, Lạng Sơn Province
- Hồng Thái, Thái Bình, a rural commune of Kiến Xương District
- Hồng Thái, Thừa Thiên-Huế, a rural commune of A Lưới District
- Hồng Thái, Tuyên Quang, a rural commune of Na Hang District
- Hồng Thái Đông, a rural commune of Đông Triều town in Quảng Ninh Province
- Hồng Thái Tây, a rural commune of Đông Triều town in Quảng Ninh Province

== People ==
- Phạm Hồng Thái, a Vietnamese activist, revolutionary and a member of Đông Du
