= Tân Phong, Lai Châu =

Ward in Lai Châu province, Vietnam

Tân Phong Phường Tân Phong
- Ward
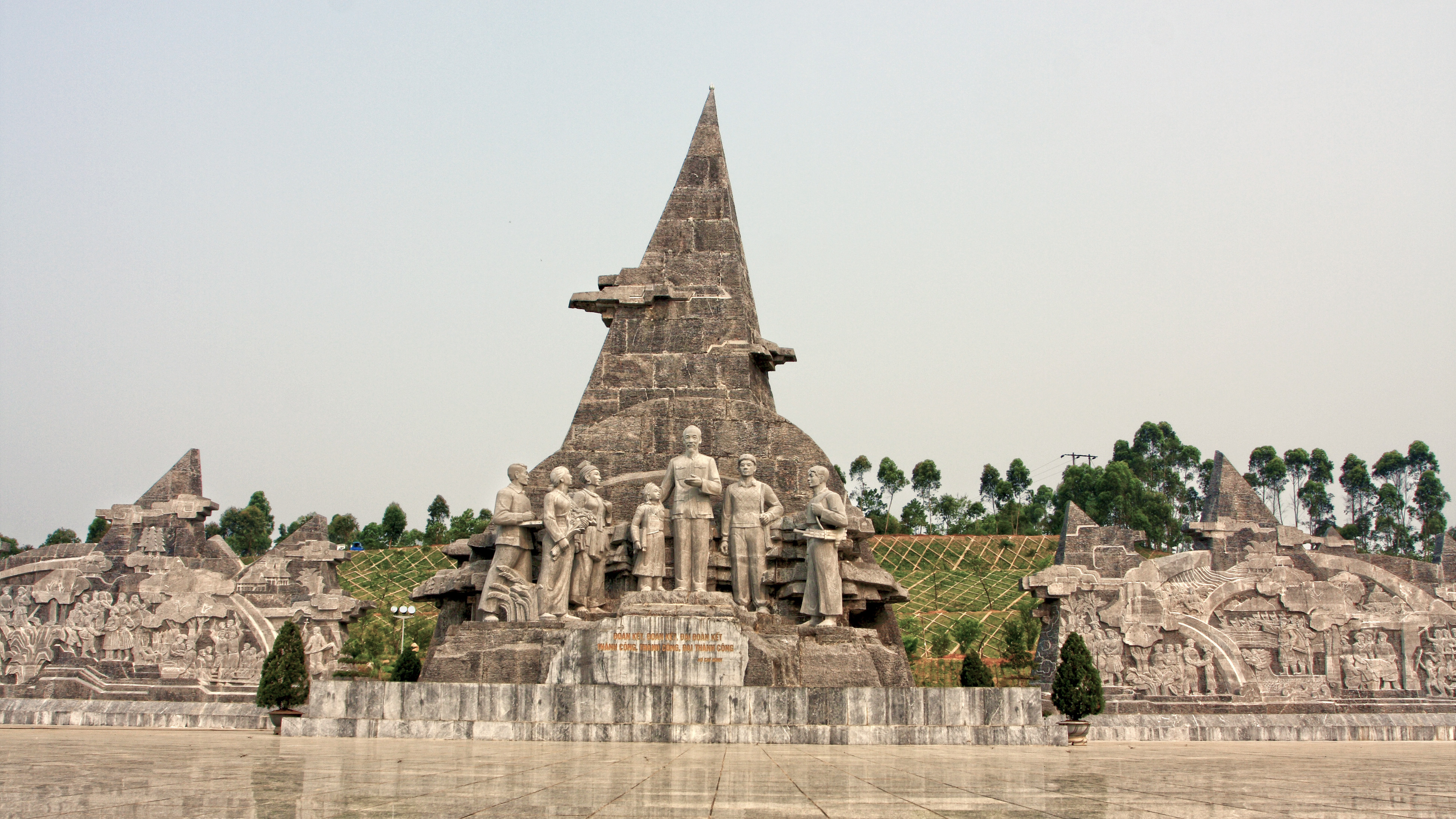
- Lai Châu Square Monument
- Interactive map of Tân Phong
- Location in Vietnam
- Country: Vietnam
- Regions: Northwest
- Province: Lai Châu Province
- Established: June 16, 2025

Area
  - Total: 106.77 km^{2} (41.22 sq mi)

Population (2025)
  - Total: 36,456
  - Density: 341.44/km^{2} (884.34/sq mi)
- Time zone: UTC+07:00 (Indochina Time)

Tân Phong is a ward (phường) of Lai Châu Province, Vietnam. It is the capital of Lai Châu Province.

== Geography ==
Tân Phong Ward located in central Lai Châu Province, and adjacent to:

- Đoàn Kết Ward and Sin Suối Hồ Commune to the north
- Khun Há Commune to the south
- Nậm Tăm Commune and Pu Sam Cáp Commune to the west
- Tả Lèng Commune to the east.

== History ==
On June 16, 2025, the Standing Committee of the National Assembly of Vietnam issued Resolution No. 1670/NQ-UBTVQH15 on the arrangement of commune-level administrative units of Lai Châu Province in 2025 (effective from June 16, 2025). Accordingly, the entire land area and population of Tân Phong Ward, Đông Phong Ward and San Thàng, Nùng Nàng, Bản Giang Communes were merged to form a new ward named Tân Phong Ward.
