= Lung Cu Flag Tower =

Monument in Vietnam

Coordinates: 23.3637°N 105.3162°E

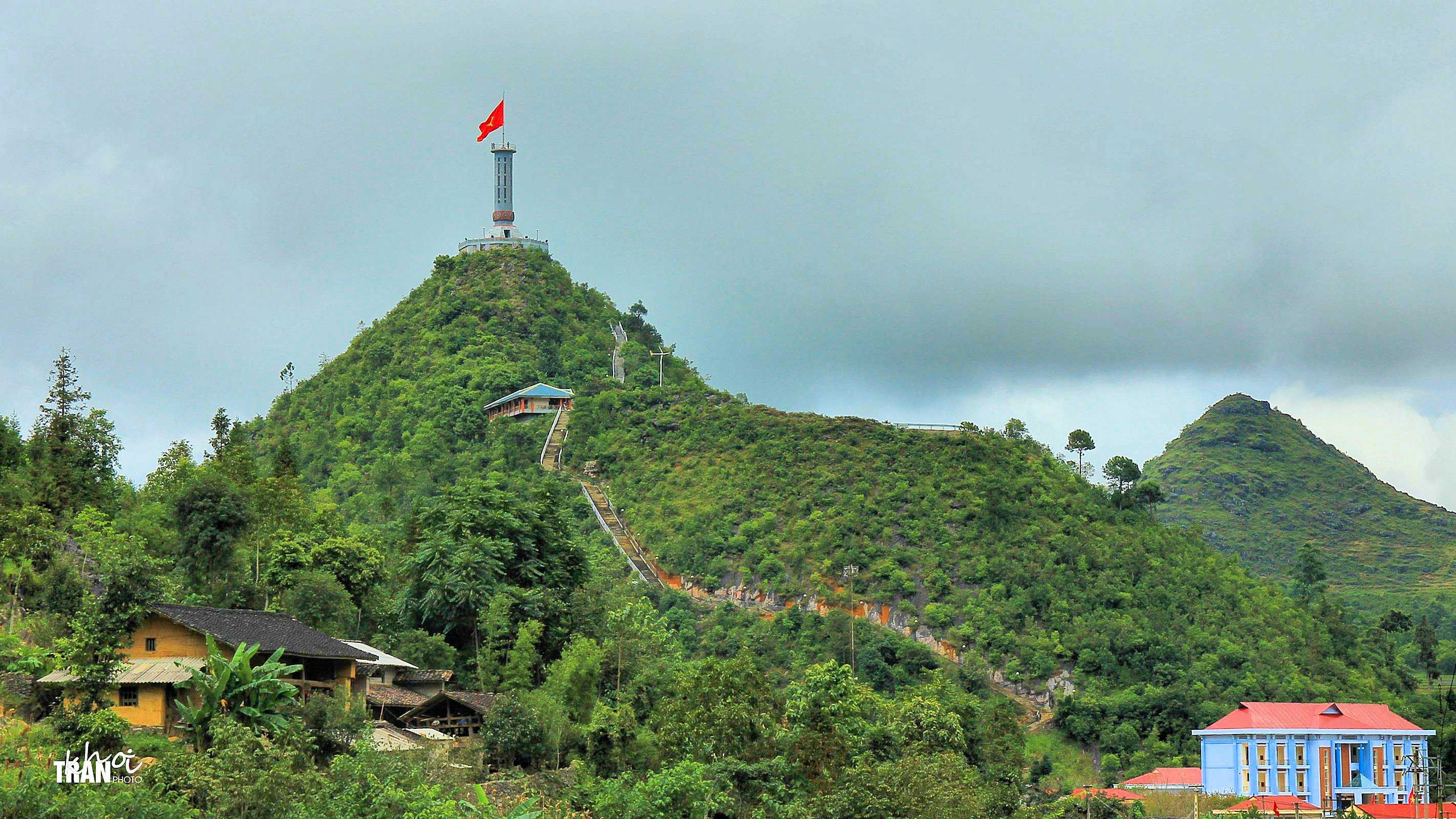
View of the flag tower

Lũng Cú Flag Tower (Vietnamese: Cột cờ Lũng Cú) is a monument in northern Vietnam. It is located in Lũng Cú commune in Tuyên Quang province. The monument consists of a 30-metre tall (98 ft) tower on the summit of Lũng Cú Peak (over 1,400 metres (4,600 ft) above sea level). The tower is topped with a large Vietnamese flag. The monument was built to mark the northernmost point in Vietnam, although the furthest north point on the Chinese-Vietnamese border is actually located over 3.3 km (2.1 mi) more north.
