= Hàm Rồng =

- Ward
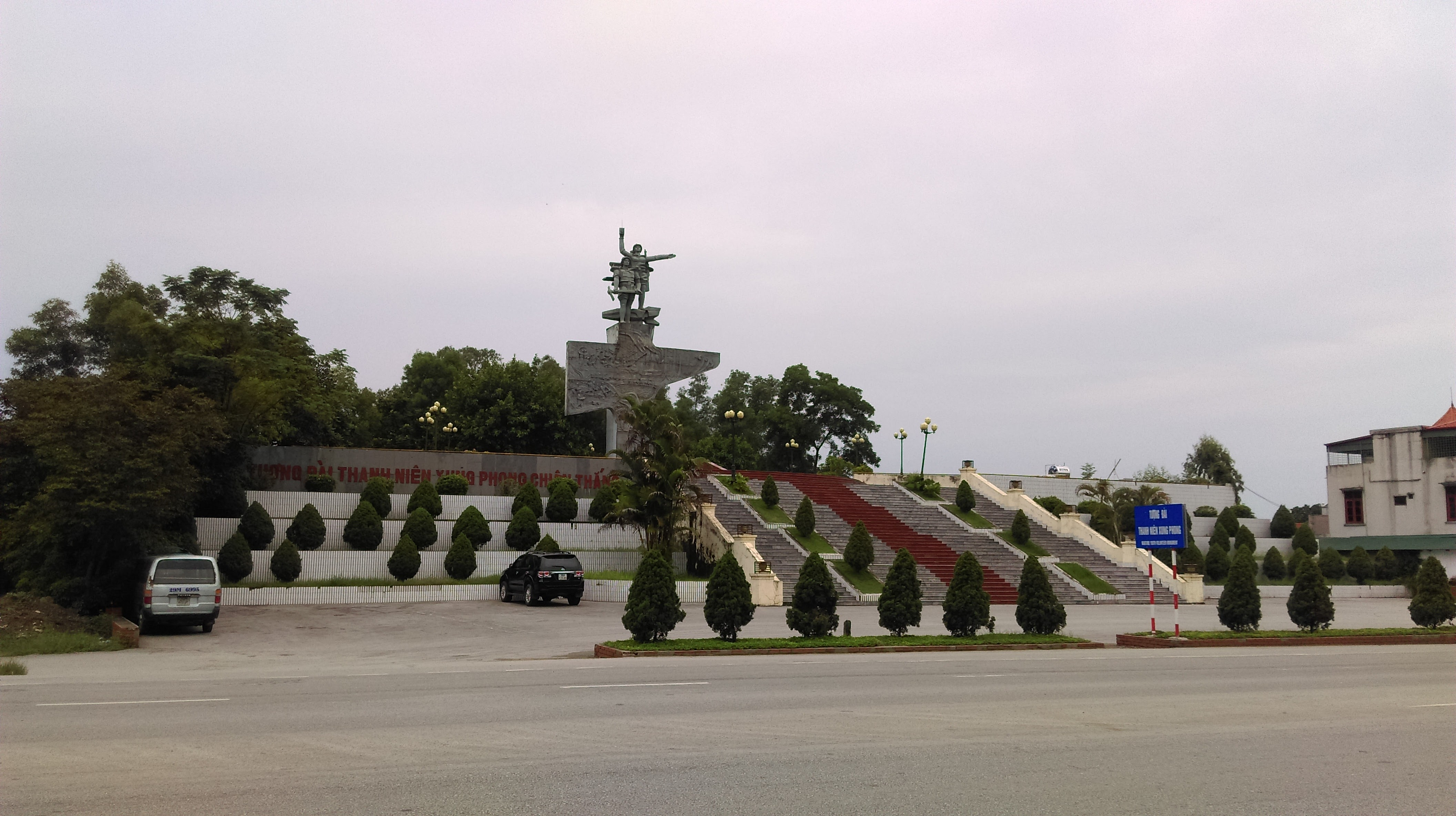
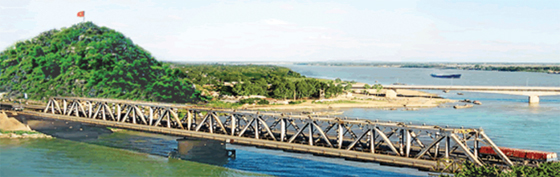
- Youth Volunteers Monument Hàm Rồng Bridge
- Interactive map of Hàm Rồng
- Coordinates: 19.842539757067176°N 105.76477305897198°E
- Country: Vietnam
- Region: North Central Coast
- Province: Thanh Hóa
- Established: 16 June 2025
- Administrative headquarters: 02 Lê Thành Street

Area
  - Total: 20.88 km^{2} (8.06 sq mi)

Population (2024)
  - Total: 63,166
  - Density: 3,024/km^{2} (7,830/sq mi)
- Postal code: 40106
- Website: hamrong.thanhhoa.gov.vn

Hàm Rồng is a ward in Thanh Hóa province, Vietnam.

On 16 June 2025, Thanh Hóa city was dissolved as part of the 2025 Vietnamese administrative reform, which abolished the district-level administrative system. Hàm Rồng Ward was established under Resolution No. 1686/NQ-UBTVQH15 of the Standing Committee of the National Assembly of Vietnam, through the merger of the area and population of:

- the entirety of four wards: Thiệu Dương, Đông Cương, Nam Ngạn, and Hàm Rồng;
- the remaining area of Đông Thọ Ward, after the area from Lý Thiên Bảo Street to the Hạc River southward was merged into Hạc Thành Ward.
