= Tuyên Quang province =

Province of Vietnam

Tuyên Quang
- Province
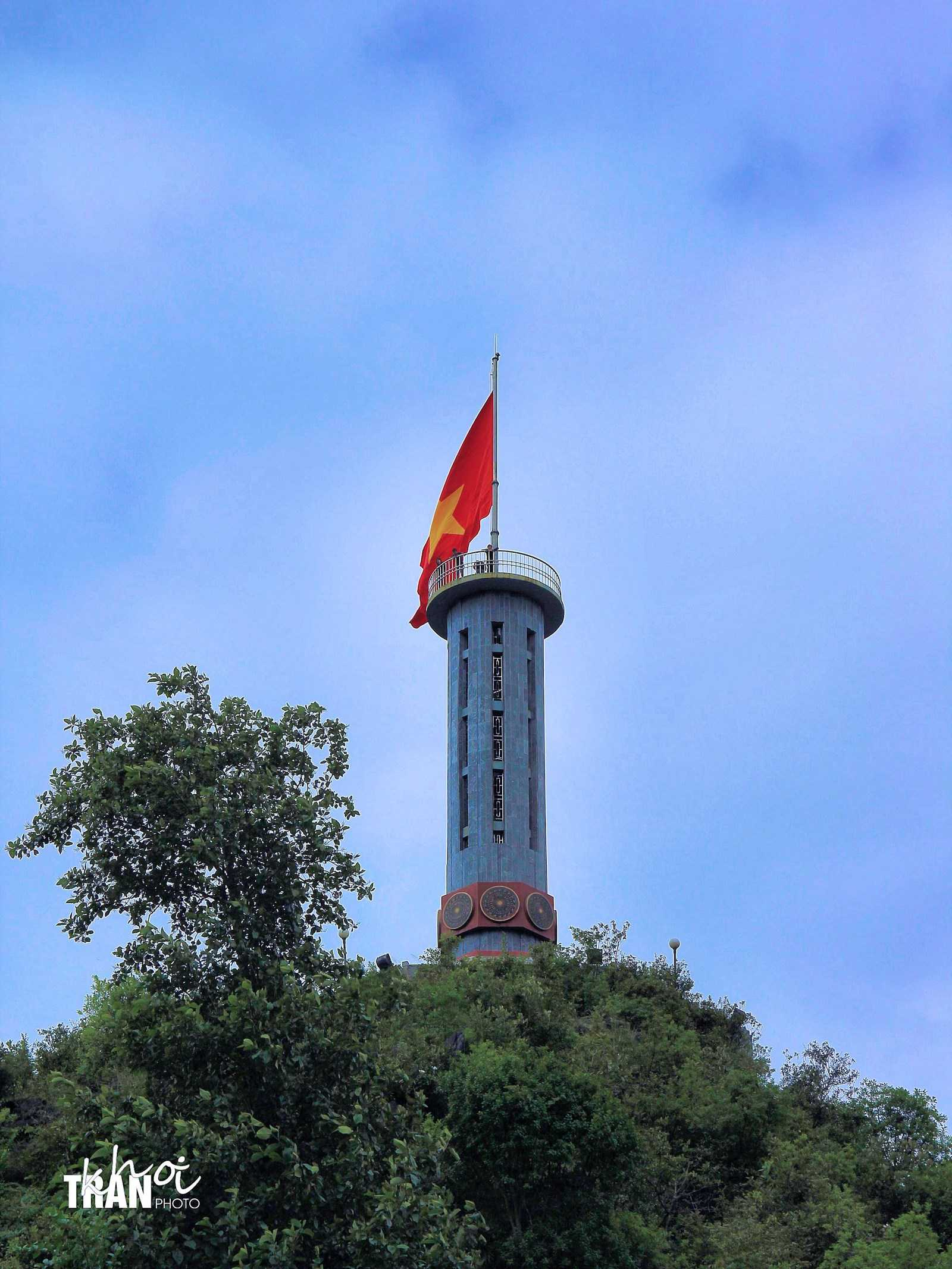
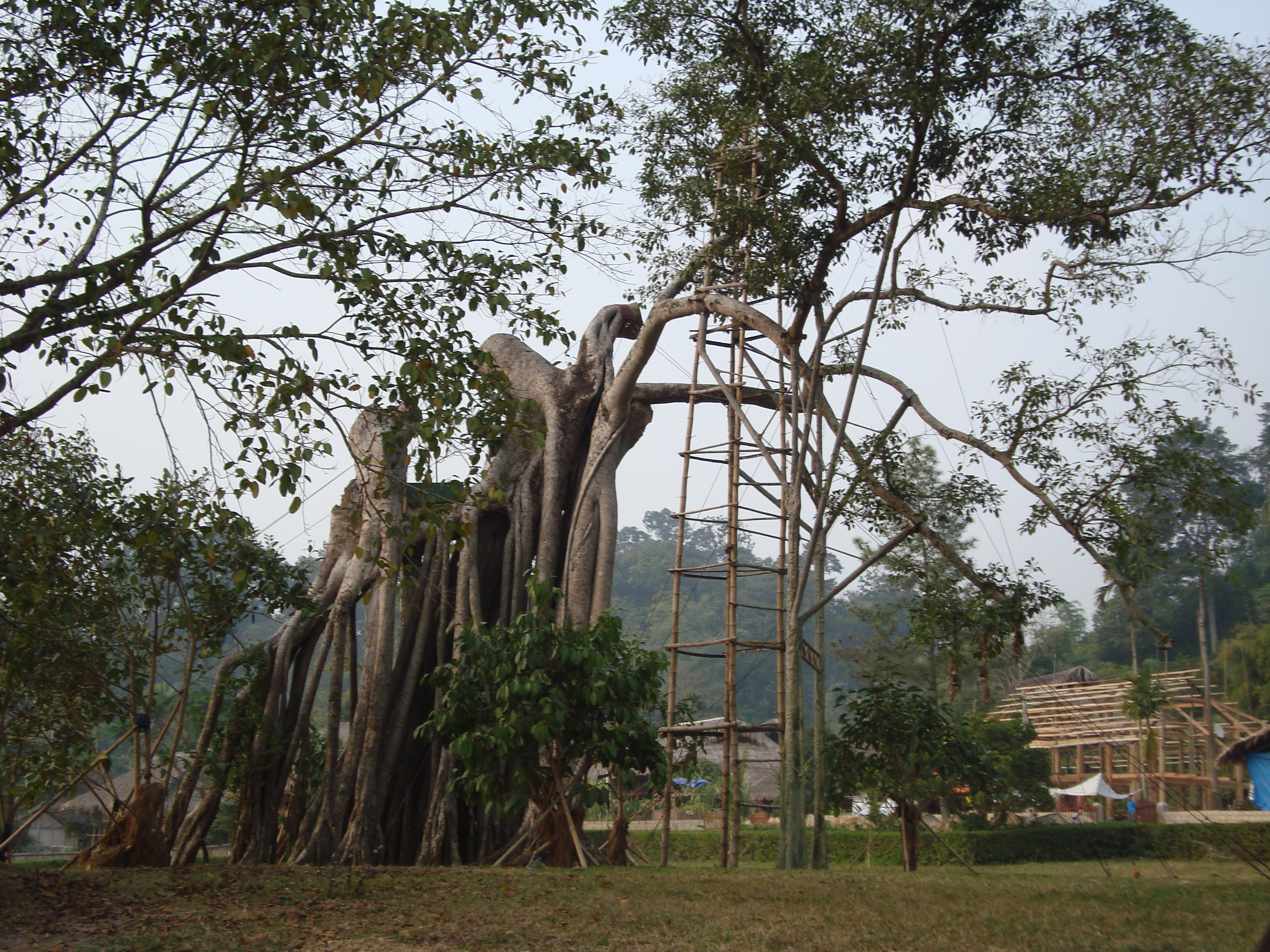
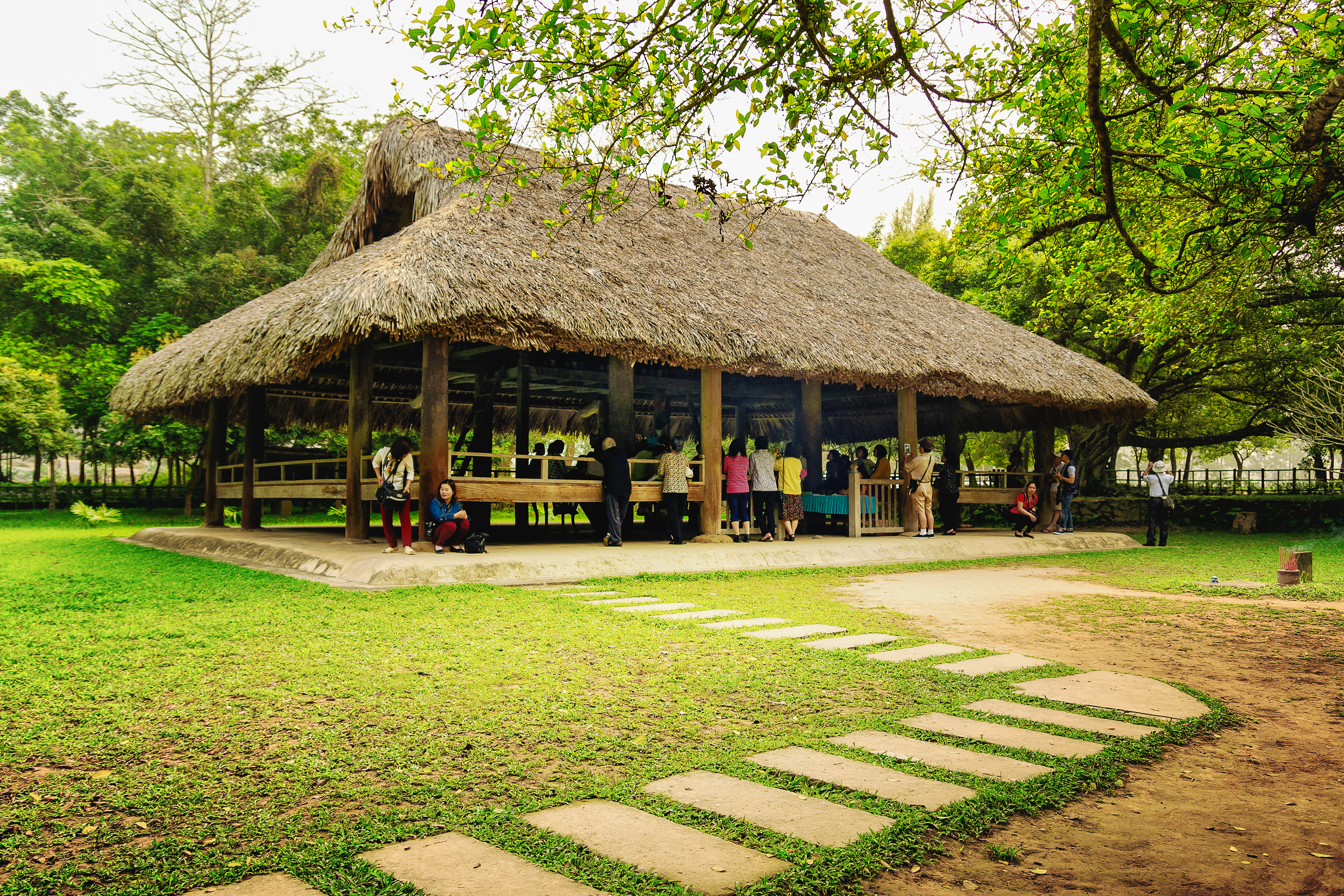
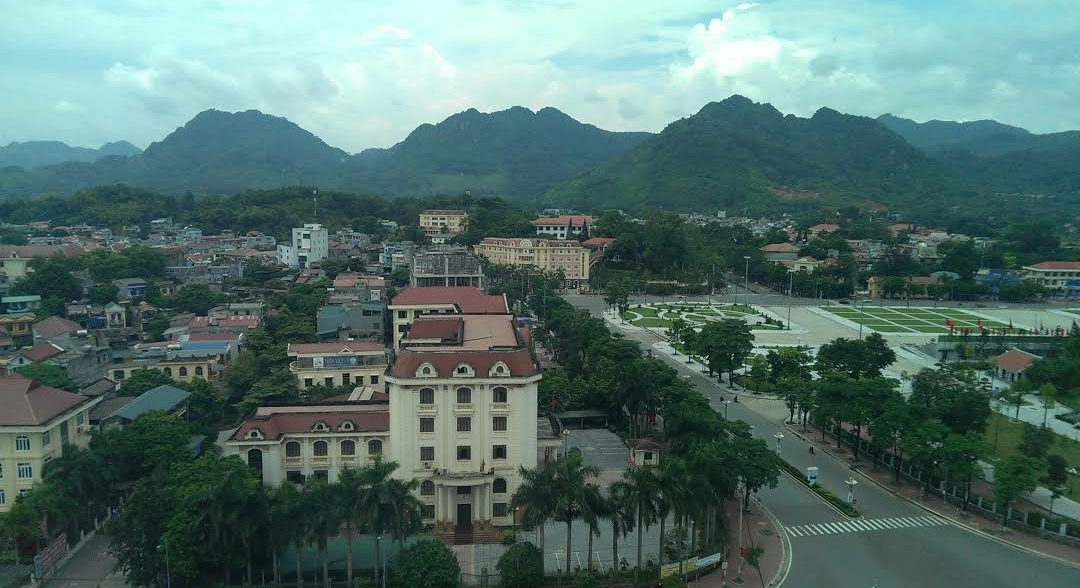
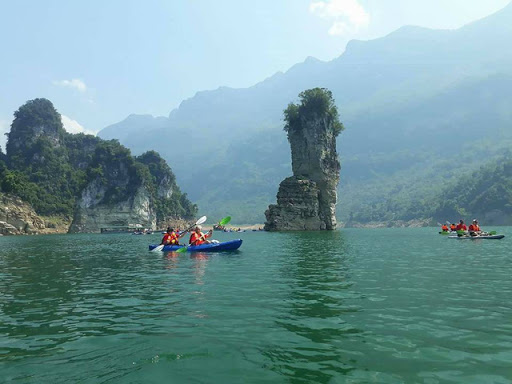
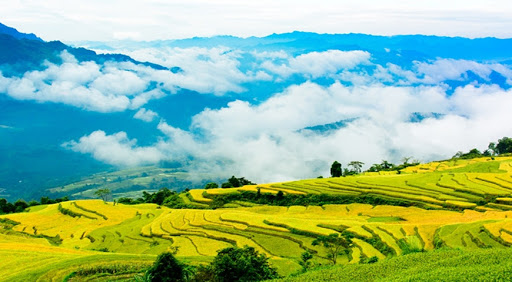
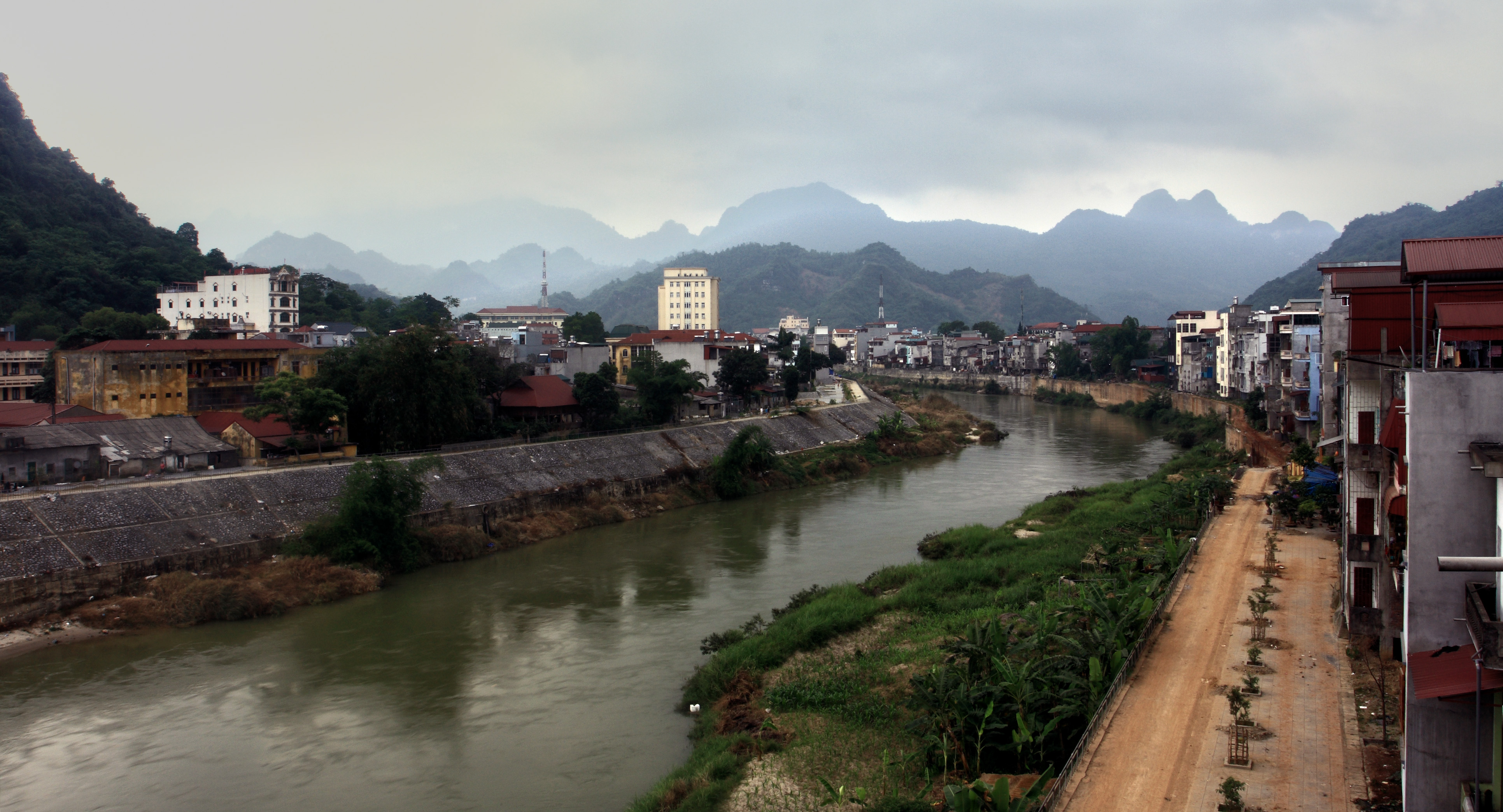
- From left to right: Lũng Cú Flag Tower, Tân Trào Banyan Tree and Hồng Thái Communal House (Tân Trào Revolutionary Base), Minh Xuân Ward, Cọc Vài scenic spot (Na Hang – Lâm Bình Nature Reserve), Hồng Thái terraced rice fields, territory of Hà Giang 1 and Hà Giang 2 Wards.

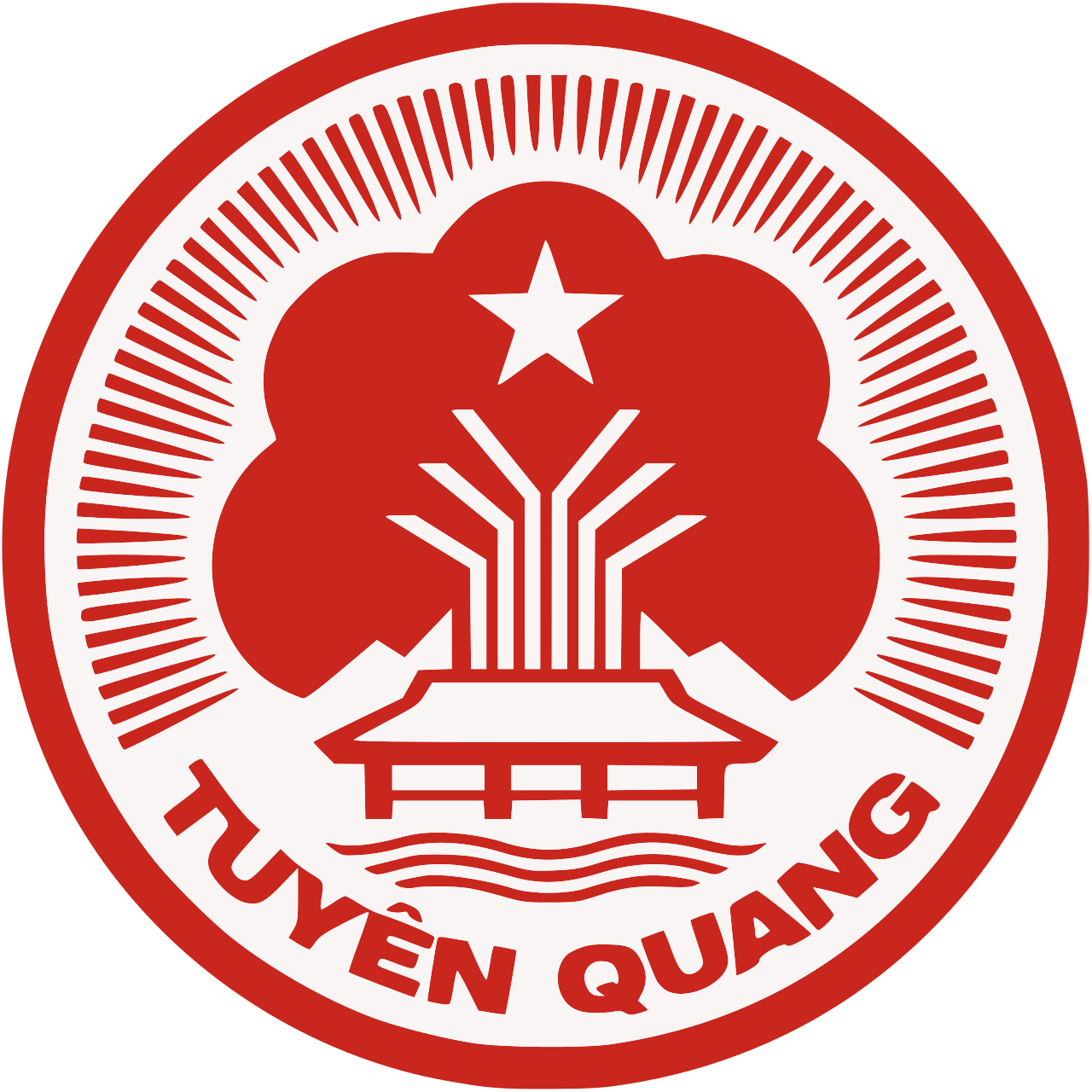
- Seal

- Location of Tuyên Quang within Vietnam
- Interactive map of Tuyên Quang
- Coordinates: 22°7′N 105°15′E
- Country: Vietnam
- Region: Northeast
- Capital: Minh Xuân Ward
- Subdivision: 7 wards, 117 communes

Government
  - Type: Province
  - Body: Tuyên Quang Provincial People's Council
  - Chairman of People's Council: Lê Thị Kim Dung
  - Chairman of People's Committee: Nguyễn Văn Sơn

Area
  - Province: 13,795.50 km^{2} (5,326.47 sq mi)

Population (2025)
  - Province: 1,865,270
  - Density: 135.209/km^{2} (350.189/sq mi)
  - Urban: 541,949

Ethnic groups
  - Vietnamese: 43.23%
  - Tày: 26.20%
  - Dao: 13.42%
  - Sán Chay: 9.00%
  - Mông: 2.72%
  - Others: 5.43%

GDP
  - Province: VND 28.084 trillion US$ 1.220 billion
- Time zone: UTC+7 (ICT)
- Area codes: 207
- ISO 3166 code: VN-07
- HDI (2020): ▲0.696 (39th)
- Website: www.tuyenquang.gov.vn

Tuyên Quang (Vietnamese: [tʷiə̄n kʷāːŋ]) is a province in the northeastern part of Vietnam, at the centre of Lô River valley, a tributary of the Red River. Its capital is Minh Xuân Ward. The province had a population of 1,865,270 in 2025, with a density of 137 persons per km^{2} over a total land area of 13,795.50 square kilometres (5,326.47 mi^{2}). Tuyên Quang Province is bordered to the northeast by Cao Bằng Province, to the east by Thái Nguyên Province, to the south by Phú Thọ Province, to the west by Lào Cai Province, and to the north by Wenshan Zhuang and Miao Autonomous Prefecture, Yunnan Province and Baise City, Guangxi Zhuang Autonomous Region of China.

== Geography ==
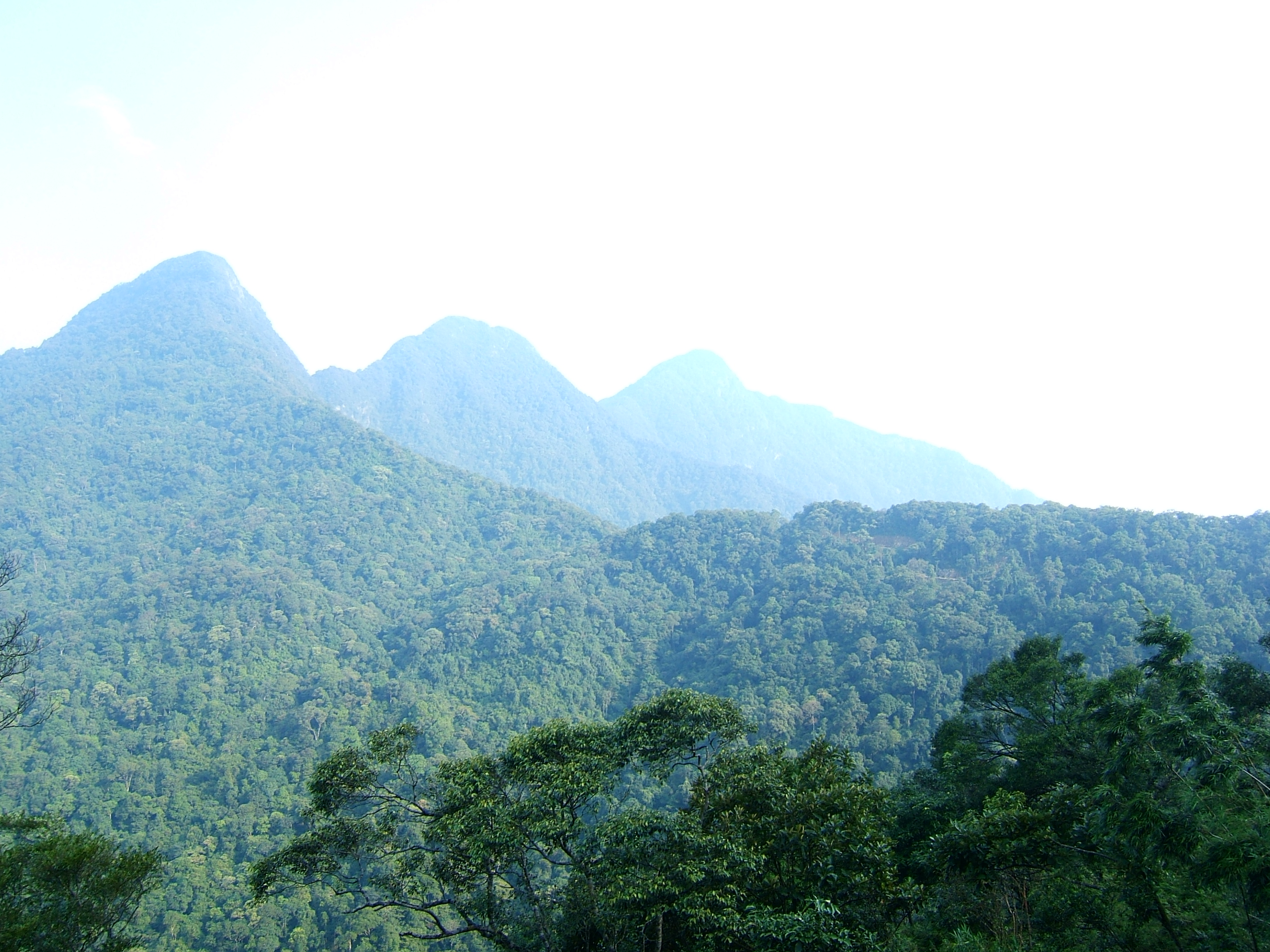
Tam Dao mountain range.

The topography covers mountains and valleys; the dominant elevation of the province is in the range 200–600 metres (660–1,970 ft). The province is in the foothills of the Northern Highlands, which forms a crescent around the Tonkin Delta; its southern part has river basins and mountain ranges (elevation below 300 metres (980 ft)), and in the northern part, the slopes are steeper, with hills taller than 1,400 metres (4,600 ft) (the highest mountain is Cham Chu at 1,589 metres (5,213 ft)). The Tam Dao range is located in this province. The Lô River, a tributary of the Red River, rises at Hà Giang, near the Chinese border. A tributary of the Lô is the Gâm River on its left bank. The province has a land area 5,900 square kilometres (2,300 mi^{2}). The province's territory has 7.2% of natural forest comprising both rain forest and monsoon forest.

The distribution of river and stream network in the province is 0.98 km/km^{2}. There are three main rivers: Lô, Gâm and Pho Day. The Lô River originates in Van Nam, China, flows through Hà Giang to this province; it flows for a length of145 kilometres (90 mi) in the province and drains an area of 2,090 square kilometres (810 mi^{2}). Its maximum flow is 11,700 m^{3}/s, while the minimum flow recorded is 128 m^{3}/s. It is a navigable river and is a water route of the province to carry goods to other provinces. The second major river is the Gâm, which originates in China and flows through Cao Bằng and Hà Giang, before entering Tuyên Quang. The Gâm joins the Lô at Tu Hiep. The river flows for 170 kilometres (110 mi) length in the province draining an area of 2,870 square kilometres (1,110 mi^{2}). The next major river is the Pho Day River which rises in the Tam Dao Mountains. It traverses 84 kilometres (52 mi) in the province through Yên Sơn, Sơn Dương District to Phú Thọ, and has a drainage area of 800 square kilometres (310 mi^{2}). There are other rivers, lakes and ponds (2000 ponds). The total volume of surface water available from all these sources is estimated at 10 BCM. River water is potable, clear and tasteless, has a pH value ranging from 6.5 and 7.5. The underground water resources of the province, according to preliminary assessments done in the past, was about 3,500,000 m^{3}/ngd. The province has three mineral water sources: two hot and one cool.

=== Minerals ===
The province has metal-mineral and non-metal resources of

- Iron ore (10 iron mines with reserve of 10-13 million tonnes in Phuc Ninh, Ha Van, Thau Cay, Cay Vaum Cay Nhan, Dong Ky Lam, Lang Muong and Lang Lech
- Lead-zinc ore mines (24 mines) and ore sites at Thuong am-Son Duong, Dong Quan-Binh Ca, Nang Kha-Na Hang, Ham Yen-Bac Nhung, Ba Xu-Kien Thiet and Hung Loi-Trung Minh (Thanh Coc) with estimated reserves of lead–zinc (level C2)- 619,298 tonnes, Pl: 981,482 tonnes, level P2: 1,032,897 tonnes
- Tin ore in Bac Lung, Ky Lam, Thanh Son, Khang Nhat (Ngoi Lem) and Ngon Dong with estimated reserves of 50,000 tonnes
- Wolfram ore with reserves of mineral sand ore of level Cl+ C2= 674 tonnes WO_{3}
- Manganese at six locations in Chiêm Hoá, with reserves of (in zone of Lang Bai level Cl + C2)- 170,149 tonnes
- Antimony with reserves of 1,191,000 tonnes

Khuon Phuc, Lang Vai and Hòa Phú mines have also been explored with nine ore sites: Lang Can, Phieng Giao, Lang ai, Na Mo, Khuon Vai, Coc Tay, Nui Quit and Lung Luong, Nui Than. Barite has been found at 24 ore sites, which could be exploited by open cast mines, in Sơn Dương, Yên Sơn and Chiêm Hoá districts. Kaolin and felspar is found in Sơn Dương and Yên Sơn districts with estimated reserves of 5 million tonnes. Limestone is assessed to be of some billion cubic metres. Clay has reserves of some million tons. Pyrite, gold and pebble sand are found in the province.

=== Transport ===
The province has National Highway No. 2 and 37 road network. Water transport routes are on the Lô, Gâm, and Pho Day Rivers which connect Tuyên Quang with neighboring provinces. Tuyên Quang township is 165 kilometres (103 mi) from Hanoi by road.

=== Climate ===
The tropical climatic seasons are the monsoon and dry season. Rainfall occurs generally during the monsoon months of May to October, which is the summer season. It is unevenly distributed due to varying topography. The average annual rainfall in the province is 1,500 millimetres (59 in) in 150 rainy days. Monsoon rainfall accounts for about 94% while the balance occurs during the dry months, which is the winter period. Depending on the season, the wind direction varies. Thunderstorms from April to August are also a climatic feature with maximum recorded rainfall of 100 millimetres (3.9 in) during one thunderstorm in some areas. Cyclonic effects with wind speed reaching 40 metres per second (130 ft/s) have been recorded in some areas. Cyclones occur every year during the transitional months between two seasons namely April and May. Other weather features noted are Mist and the hoarfrost; mist occurs at the beginning of the winter months; recorded for 25 to 55 days in the south and 60 to 80 days in the North. Hoarfrost occurs once every 2 years on average in January or November and for just one day.

The temperate to subtropical, tropical climate facilitates growth of natural flora and a diversified plant mechanism. The northern region of the province experiences a longer winter with lower temperatures. The region gets more rain during summer. The southern region has a diversified climate with a shorter winter and hotter summer followed by a monsoonal season. The rainstorms resulted in floods. The average temperature in the province is 22.4 °C (72.3 °F).

== Demographics ==
According to the General Statistics Office of the Government of Vietnam, the province had a population of 784,811 in 2019, with a density of 130 persons per km^{2} over a total land area of 5,867.3 square kilometres (2,265.4 mi^{2}).

== Economy ==
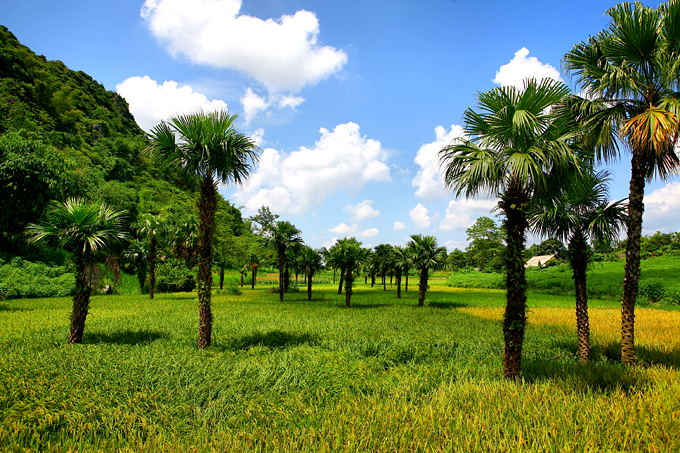
Agricultural fields in Tuyên Quang

The province's economy is dependent on its primary industries. The land economy is dependent on the agricultural growth in the province, which is dependent to a land area of 1,051 square kilometres (406 mi^{2})) under agriculture, about 20% of the province. This has caused deforestation. The practice of shifting cultivation called the "swidden agriculture" (practiced by ethnic minorities) is limited to 3000 ha, as in 1992, and is said to be reducing under a UNDP funded project; has covered the aquaculture development in ponds. The Lô River which flows through the province has potential for development of aquaculture.

The province has 900 villages in upland areas, which are inhabited mostly by ethnic minorities. Under an IFAD funded project for Rural Development (IFAD loan:US$20.9 million), agricultural training has been provided to the farmers on pilot plots to teach them to adopt new practices and techniques in the field of agriculture, animal husbandry, credit, food storage and processing that are appropriate for the local environment. Infrastructure, health services and village level institutions like the savings and credit groups, user groups and village development boards have also been supported by this funding. The forestry sector of the economy is influenced by the Bai Bang pulp and paper mill. It was established in the 1980s with financial help from Sweden. Commercial logging is carried out in the plantation forests by the state-sponsored enterprises to supply pulp to the factory.

As against the national figure of 7,592 agriculture, forestry and fishery cooperatives, there are 147 agriculture cooperatives in the province (142 are farming and 6 are fishery cooperatives). There are 54 farms in the province compared to the national number of 120,699.

The output value of agricultural produce at constant 1994 prices in the province was 959.5 billion đồngs, compared to the national value of 156,681.9 billion dongs. The province produced 569,400 tonnes of cereals as against the national production of 324,200 tonnes.

The per capita production of cereals in the district was 434.1 kilograms (957 lb) as against the national figure of 501.8 kg in 2007. In 2007, the industrial output of the province was 1102.7 billion đồngs against the national output of 1.47 million billion dongs.

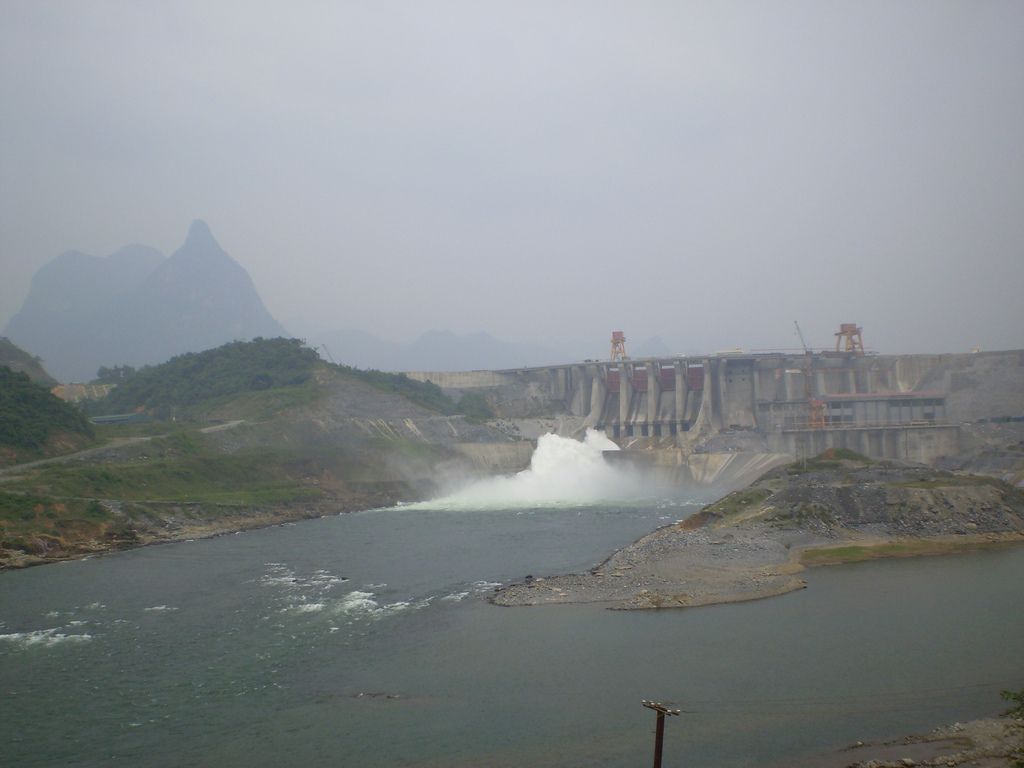
Na Hang Dam

The Tuyên Quang Hydropower Plant, also known as Dai Thi, is a hydroelectric power project located within the province on the Gam River near Pac Ta Mountain. Construction began on December 22, 2002, and the first unit was commissioned in March 2008 followed by the two other units by end of 2008. The power plant has a capacity of 342 MW (the second largest in the north), and has an energy generating potential of 1200 GWh/year. The project's estimated approved cost was US$490 million. The project, as built, has a 92 metres (302 ft) rock fill dam and 718 metres (2,356 ft) long (crest length), called the Na Hang Dam. It has a gross storage capacity of 2.3 billion cubic metres (BCM) (including 1 BCM of flood storage) on the Gâm River.

== Biodiversity ==
=== Forest ===
Cultivated land including permanent cropland are mainly in the south of the province. The closed forest is typical of the northern districts. Bamboo forests are present recorded in all districts of the province, except Na Hang. The area of forests have reduced due to conversion into agricultural land or because they have become barren. This reduction could not be exactly correlated to the changes in the biodiversity of the province.

=== Flora and fauna ===
Data compiled for the province has recorded flora from 90 families, 258 classes, and 597 species, and some of them are listed as endangered. The Vietnamese Red Book lists 18 scarce and precious plants in the province including aloe wood, pantace vietnamiensis, textured wood, limestone vatica, hoang dan and abony-tree.

There are 293 faunal species, of which there are 51 animal species belonging to 19 families; there are 175 bird species of 45 families; there are 5 reptile species and 17 amphibian species from 5 families. 39 animal species are listed in the scarce and precious category. Fauna in danger of extinction comprise 18 species of animals, 12 species of birds, 12 species of reptiles and one species of amphibian. The six mammal species particularly identified in the area are the tiger, the Asian black bear, the clouded leopard, the Indian muntjac (a cervine), black gibbon, the apricot panther, the sambar (another small cervine) and the Sumatran serow (a caprine). The primates identified are the Tonkin snub-nosed monkey and Phayre's leaf monkey; the last named is reported to be extinct. The habitat of the mammals, including primates, is stated to be shrinking due to deforestation and expansion of agricultural activities.

=== Historical places ===
Historical places in the province include the Cave Pagoda at Yên Sơn; the Dat Nong Tien and the Thuong Temple in Tuyên Quang. There is the My Lam Mineral Spring. There are 26 registered historical monuments, eight cultural centres and 42 communal cultural houses in the province. The predominant Christian churches in the province are the seven Roman Catholic churches; 60% of the province is believed to be Catholic.

Na Hang is located more than 100 km from the center of Tuyen Quang city, known as "the green pearl in the Tuyen Quang sky" and "Ha Long Bay in the mountains", this place's area is up to more than 15,000 hectares. Na Hang has mountains, forests, lakes, and islands, including more than 8,000 hectares covered by water. Na Hang ecological lake connects waterways from Na Hang town with 8 communes of Na Hang district and communes of Lam Binh district, connecting to Ba Be National Scenic Area. Na Hang has 12 resident ethnic groups.

=== Festivals ===
Festivals celebrated in the province include the Gieng Tanh village festival and the Qua Tang festival of the Dao people.
