= First-level subdivisions of Vietnam =

Vietnam's top-level subdivisions

- Category: Unitary state
- Location: Vietnam
- Created: 2 September 1945 (DRV); 2 July 1976 (reunification and expansion); 1 July 2025 (current form)
- Number: 25 provinces 9 municipalities (as of 20 September, 2026)
- Populations: 512,601 (Lai Châu) – 14,002,598 (Ho Chi Minh City)
- Areas: 2,514.81 km^{2} (970.97 sq mi) (Hưng Yên) — 24,233.07 km^{2} (9,356.44 sq mi) (Lâm Đồng)
- Government: Provincial-level communist states
- Subdivisions: Commune; Ward; Special zone

Vietnam is divided into 34 first-level subdivisions, comprising 25 provinces (tỉnh) and 9 municipalities (thành phố trực thuộc trung ương) under the command of the central government.

== List and statistics ==

By the end of 2024, the population of Vietnam was 101,343,800. The most populous top-level administrative unit is Hồ Chí Minh City, one of the nine centrally governed cities, having 14,002,598 people living within its official boundary. The second most populous administrative unit is Hà Nội with 8,807,523 people. The least populous is Lai Châu, a mountainous province in the northwest with 512,601 people. In land area, the largest province is Lâm Đồng with 24,233.09 km^{2}, the smallest is Hưng Yên (2,514.81 km^{2}), located in the Red River Delta region.

The following is a table of Vietnam's provinces broken down by population and area. Municipalities are written in bold.

Seal	City/province	Type	Map number	Administrative center	Land Area (km²)	Population	Density (/km²)	Administrative divisions			Region
Seal	City/province	Type	Map number	Administrative center	Land Area (km²)	Population	Density (/km²)	Communes	Wards	Special Zones	Region
	Cao Bằng	Province	16	Thục Phán	6,700	573,119	85	53	3	0	Northeast
	Lạng Sơn	Province	17	Lương Văn Tri	8,310	881,384	106	61	4	0	Northeast
	Phú Thọ	Province	20	Việt Trì	9,361	4,022,638	429	133	15	0	Northeast
	Thái Nguyên	Province	19	Phan Đình Phùng	8,376	1,799,489	214	76	15	0	Northeast
	Tuyên Quang	Province	18	Minh Xuân	13,796	1,865,270	135	177	7	0	Northeast
	Lào Cai	Province	14	Yên Bái	13,257	1,778,785	134	89	10	0	Northwest
	Điện Biên	Province	12	Điện Biên Phủ	9,540	673,091	70	42	3	0	Northwest
	Lai Châu	Province	13	Tân Phong	9,069	512,601	56	36	2	0	Northwest
	Sơn La	Province	15	Chiềng Cơi	14,110	1,404,587	99	67	8	0	Northwest
	Bắc Ninh	City	9	Bắc Giang	4,719	3,619,433	1,132	66	33	0	Red River Delta
	Hưng Yên	Province	10	Phố Hiến	2,515	3,567,943	1,418	93	11	0	Red River Delta
	Ninh Bình	Province	11	Hoa Lư	3,943	4,412,464	1,119	97	32	0	Red River Delta
	Hanoi	City	1	Hoàn Kiếm	3,360	8,807,523	2,621	75	51	0	Red River Delta
	Haiphong	City	3	Thủy Nguyên	3,195	4,664,124	1,459	67	45	2	Red River Delta
	Quảng Ninh	City	8	Hạ Long	6,208	1,497,477	241	22	30	2	Red River Delta
	Hà Tĩnh	Province	23	Thành Sen	5,994	1,622,901	270	60	9	0	North Central
	Nghệ An	Province	22	Trường Vinh	16,486	3,831,694	232	119	11	0	North Central
	Quảng Trị	Province	24	Đồng Hới	12,700	1,870,845	147	69	8	1	North Central
	Thanh Hóa	Province	21	Hạc Thành	11,115	4,324,783	389	147	19	0	North Central
	Huế	City	6	Thuận Hóa	4,947	1,432,986	289	19	21	0	North Central
	Đắk Lắk	Province	27	Buôn Ma Thuột	18,096	3,346,853	184	88	14	0	South Central Coast and Central Highlands
	Gia Lai	Province	26	Quy Nhơn	21,577	3,583,693	166	110	25	0	South Central Coast and Central Highlands
	Lâm Đồng	Province	29	Xuân Hương – Đà Lạt	24,233	3,872,999	159	103	20	1	South Central Coast and Central Highlands
	Khánh Hòa	Province	28	Nha Trang	8,556	2,243,554	262	48	16	1	South Central Coast and Central Highlands
	Quảng Ngãi	Province	25	Cẩm Thành	14,833	2,161,755	145	86	9	1	South Central Coast and Central Highlands
	Da Nang	City	4	Hải Châu	11,833	3,065,628	258	70	23	1	South Central Coast and Central Highlands
	Đồng Nai	City	7	Trấn Biên	12,737	4,491,408	352	62	33	0	Southeast
	Tây Ninh	Province	30	Long An	8,537	3,254,170	381	82	14	0	Southeast
	Ho Chi Minh City	City	2	Saigon	6,773	14,002,598	2,067	54	113	1	Southeast
	An Giang	Province	32	Rạch Giá	9,889	4,952,238	500	85	14	3	Mekong Delta
	Cà Mau	Province	34	Tân Thành	7,942	2,606,672	328	55	9	0	Mekong Delta
	Đồng Tháp	Province	31	Mỹ Tho	5,939	4,370,046	735	82	20	0	Mekong Delta
	Vĩnh Long	Province	33	Long Châu	6,296	4,257,581	676	105	19	0	Mekong Delta
	Cần Thơ	City	5	Ninh Kiều	6,361	4,199,824	660	72	31	0	Mekong Delta

== Regions ==

The provinces of Vietnam are sometimes divided into seven regions (sometimes Northeast and Northwest regions are merged into Northern midlands and mountainous region), which are grouped into three macro-regions: Northern, Central and Southern. These regions are not always used, and alternative classifications are possible. The regions include:

Regions of Vietnam
Macro-region	Region	Provinces / municipalities	Area (km^{2})	Population	Population density (people /km^{2})	Notes
Northern Vietnam (Bắc Bộ)	Northwest (Tây Bắc Bộ)	Điện Biên; Lai Châu; Lào Cai; Sơn La	45,974.47	4,369,064	95	Contains inland provinces in the west of Vietnam's northern region. Two of them are along Vietnam's border with Laos, and three border China (Điện Biên borders both China and Laos).
Northern Vietnam (Bắc Bộ)	Northeast (Đông Bắc Bộ)	Cao Bằng; Lạng Sơn; Phú Thọ; Thái Nguyên; Tuyên Quang	52,750.61	10,639,377	201	Contains most of the mountainous provinces that lie to north of the highly populated Red River lowlands. Three of them are along Vietnam's border with China.
Northern Vietnam (Bắc Bộ)	Red River Delta (Đồng bằng sông Hồng)	Bắc Ninh ^{†}; Hanoi ^{†}; Haiphong ^{†}; Hưng Yên; Ninh Bình; Quảng Ninh ^{†}	16,206.71	25,071,487	1,546	Contains the small but populous provinces along the mouth of the Red River. The Red River Delta has the smallest area but highest population and population density of all regions. One province (Quảng Ninh) borders China.
Central Vietnam (Trung Bộ)	North Central Coast (Bắc Trung Bộ)	Hà Tĩnh; Nghệ An; Quảng Trị; Thanh Hóa; Huế ^{†}	51,242.77	11,212,364	218	Contains the coastal provinces in the northern half of Vietnam's narrow central part. They all stretch from the coast in the east to Laos in the west.
Central Vietnam (Trung Bộ)	South Central Coast and Central Highlands (Duyên Hải Nam Trung Bộ và Tây Nguyên)	Da Nang ^{†}; Đắk Lắk; Gia Lai; Khánh Hòa; Lâm Đồng; Quảng Ngãi	99,154.4	18,274,482	184	Contains the coastal and mountainous provinces in the southern half of Vietnam's central part. There are a significant number of ethnic minorities in the region. Two provinces are along Vietnam's border with Laos, and four border Cambodia (Quảng Ngãi borders both Laos and Cambodia).
Southern Vietnam (Nam Bộ)	Southeast (Đông Nam Bộ)	Đồng Nai ^{†}; Ho Chi Minh City ^{†}; Tây Ninh	28,046.21	21,748,176	775	Contains those parts of lowland southern Vietnam which are north of the Mekong delta. Two provinces border Cambodia.
Southern Vietnam (Nam Bộ)	Mekong River Delta (Đồng bằng sông Cửu Long)	An Giang; Cà Mau; Cần Thơ ^{†}; Đồng Tháp; Vĩnh Long	36,426.97	20,386,361	559	Vietnam's southernmost region, mostly containing small but populous provinces in the delta of the Mekong. It is sometimes referred to as the Southwest region (Tây Nam Bộ). Two provinces border Cambodia.

^† Indicates a municipality (thành phố trực thuộc trung ương)

== Historical provinces ==
Province	Established	Dissolved	Note
An Xuyên	1956	1976	Merged into Minh Hải province
Bà Rịa–Vũng Tàu	1991	2025	Merged with Ho Chi Minh city
Bạc Liêu	1997	2025	Merged with Cà Mau province
Bắc Giang	1997	2025	Merged with Bắc Ninh province
Bắc Kạn	1997	2025	Merged with Thái Nguyên province
Bắc Thái	1965	1996	Split into Bắc Kạn and Thái Nguyên provinces
Bến Tre	1976	2025	Merged with Vĩnh Long province
Biên Hòa	1832	1976	Merged with Đồng Nai province
Bình Dương	1997	2025	Merged with Hồ Chí Minh city
Bình Định	1989	2025	Merged with Gia Lai province
Bình Phước	1997	2025	Merged with Đồng Nai province
Bình Thuận	1991	2025	Merged with Lâm Đồng province
Bình Trị Thiên	1976	1992	Split into Quảng Bình, Quảng Trị and Thừa Thiên – Huế provinces
Bình Tuy	1956	1976	Merged into Thuận Hải province
Chợ Lớn	1900	1957	Split amongst neighboring provinces
Chương Thiện	1961	1976	Merged into Hậu Giang province
Cửu Long	1976	1992	Split into Vĩnh Long and Vĩnh Bình provinces
Đắk Nông	2004	2025	Merged with Lâm Đồng province
Định Tường	1832	1976	Merged into Tiền Giang province
Gia Định	1832	1976	Converted to Hồ Chí Minh city
Gia Lai – Kon Tum	1975	1991	Split into Gia Lai and Kon Tum provinces
Gò Công	1900	1976	Merged into Tiền Giang province
Hà Bắc	1962	1996	Split into Bắc Giang and Bắc Ninh provinces
Hà Đông	1904	1965	Merged into Hà Tây province
Hà Giang	1991	2025	Merged with Tuyên Quang province
Hà Nam	1991	2025	Merged with Ninh Bình province
Hà Nam Ninh	1975	1991	Split into Hà Nam, Nam Định and Ninh Bình provinces
Hà Sơn Bình	1975	1991	Split into Hà Tây and Hòa Bình provinces
Hà Tây	1965	1975	Merged into Hà Sơn Bình province
Hà Tây	1991	2008	Merged into Hà Nội city
Hà Tuyên	1975	1991	Split into Hà Giang and Tuyên Quang provinces
Hải Hưng	1968	1996	Split into Hải Dương and Hưng Yên provinces
Hải Dương	1997	2025	Merged with Haiphong city
Hậu Giang	2004	2025	Merged with Cần Thơ city
Hậu Nghĩa	1963	1976	Split amongst neighboring provinces
Hòa Bình	1991	2025	Merged with Phú Thọ province
Hoàng Liên Sơn	1975	1991	Split into Lào Cai and Yên Bái provinces
Hưng Hóa	1831	1903	
Kiên Giang	1976	2025	Merged with An Giang province
Kiến An	1888	1962	Merged with Hải Phòng city
Kon Tum	1991	2025	Merged with Quảng Ngãi province
Long An	1976	2025	Merged with Tây Ninh province
Long Khánh	1956	1976	Merged into Đồng Nai province
Minh Hải	1976	1996	Split into Cà Mau and Bạc Liêu provinces
Nam Định	1991	2025	Merged with Ninh Bình province
Nghệ Tĩnh	1976	1991	Split into Nghệ An and Hà Tĩnh provinces
Nghĩa Bình	1975	1989	Split into Quảng Ngãi and Bình Định provinces
Ninh Thuận	1992	2025	Merged with Khánh Hòa province
Phú Bổn	1962	1976	Merged with Đắk Lắk province
Phú Khánh	1975	1989	Split into Phú Yên and Khánh Hòa provinces
Phúc Yên	1904	1950	Merged into Vĩnh Phúc province
Phú Yên	1989	2025	Merged with Đắk Lắk province
Phước Long	1956	1976	Merged into Sông Bé province
Phước Thành	1959	1965	
Phước Tuy	1956	1976	Merged with Đồng Nai province
Quảng Bình	1989	2025	Merged with Quảng Trị province
Quảng Đức	1959	1976	Merged with Đắk Lắk province
Quảng Nam	1997	2025	Merged with Đà Nẵng city
Quảng Nam–Đà Nẵng/Quảng Đà	1975	1996	Split into Quảng Nam province and Đà Nẵng city
Quảng Tín	1962	1976	Merged with Quảng Nam province
Sa Đéc	1900	1976	Merged into Đồng Tháp provicne
Sóc Trăng	1991	2025	Merged with Cần Thơ city
Sông Bé	1976	1997	Split into Bình Dương and Bình Phước provinces
Tân An	1900	1956	Merged into Long An province
Thái Bình	1890	2025	Merged with Hưng Yên province
Thừa Thiên Huế	1989	2025	Converted to Huế city
Thuận Hải	1975	1991	Split into Ninh Thuận and Bình Thuận provinces
Tiền Giang	1976	2025	Merged with Đồng Tháp province
Trà Vinh	1992	2025	Merged with Vĩnh Long province
Tuyên Đức	1958	1976	Merged with Lâm Đồng province
Vĩnh Bình	1956	1976	Merged into Cửu Long province
Vĩnh Phú	1968	1996	Split into Vĩnh Phúc and Phú Thọ provinces
Vĩnh Phúc	1997	2025	Merged with Phú Thọ province
Yên Bái	1991	2025	Merged with Lào Cai province

== See also ==
- ISO 3166-2:VN
- Plan for arrangement and merger of administrative units in Vietnam 2024–2025
