= Tú Sản canyon =

Canyon on the Nho Quế River in northeastern Vietnam

Tú Sản Canyon
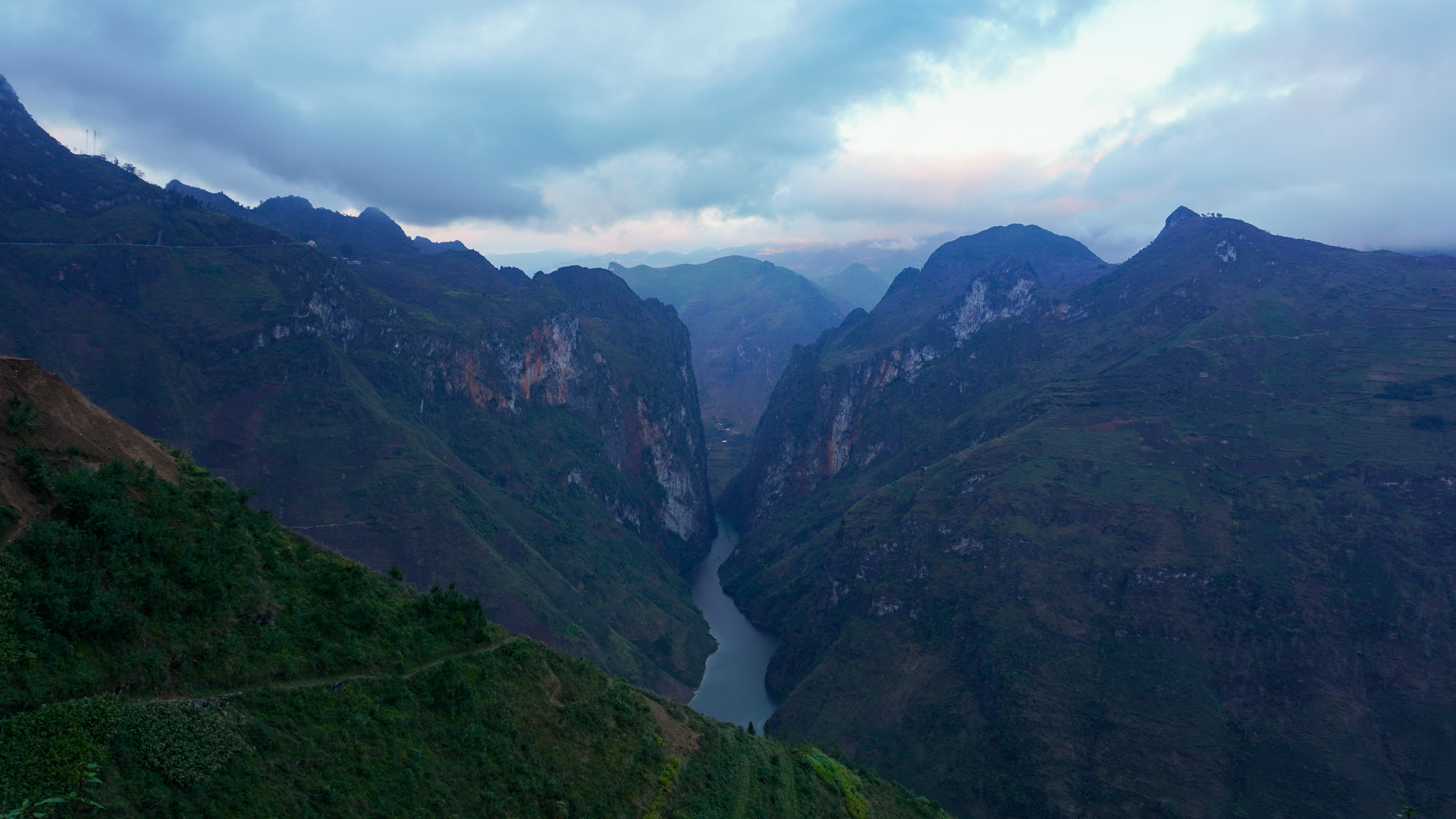
- View into the canyon from the plateau road

Naming
- Native name: Hẻm vực Tú Sản

Geography
- Location: Mèo Vạc, Tuyên Quang, Vietnam
- River: Nho Quế River

Tú Sản Canyon (Hẻm vực Tú Sản) is a canyon cut by the Nho Quế River in northeastern Vietnam. It lies below Mã Pí Lèng Pass, along National Highway 4C between Đồng Văn and Mèo Vạc, and is part of the landscape of the Đồng Văn Karst Plateau (a member of the UNESCO Global Geoparks network). The canyon is a common viewpoint stop on the Ha Giang Loop.

== Overview ==
Tú Sản Canyon forms a narrow gorge in a steep river valley beneath the plateau road at Mã Pí Lèng. The canyon is part of the same scenic corridor as the pass viewpoint area and is commonly visited as a paired stop along the plateau-to-river overlook route.

The canyon sits within the Đồng Văn Karst Plateau and is used in geopark interpretation as an example of high-relief terrain shaped by river downcutting through carbonate bedrock. In this framing, the plateau and the incised river corridor are presented together as a linked landscape unit for conservation, education, and visitor interpretation.

== Geology and landforms ==
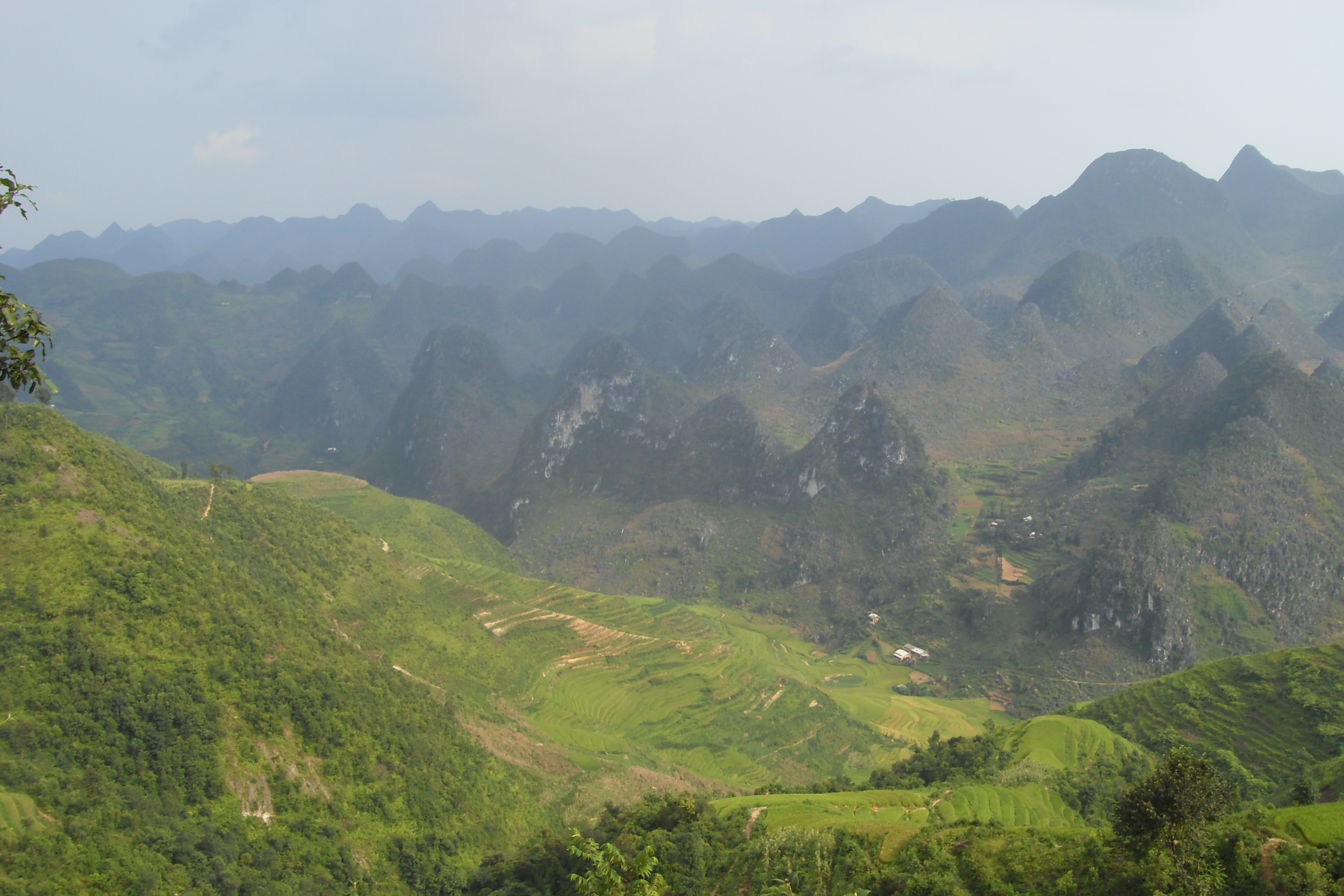
Karst massif on the plateau (Đồng Văn area).

The canyon lies in a karst landscape developed largely in limestone, where surface and subsurface dissolution has produced rugged relief and rock towers across the plateau. Along the Mã Pí Lèng corridor, the river has cut a deeply incised channel, leaving near-vertical cliff faces and narrow benches that accentuate the height contrast between the road and the valley floor.

Geoheritage assessments of the pass area treat the canyon walls and river incision as part of a broader assemblage of distinctive landforms supporting site interpretation and visitor use. In this context, the canyon is discussed as a visually prominent landform with value for geomorphology, landscape interpretation, and locally managed geotourism.

== Heritage designation and management ==
The canyon is associated with the protected scenic-landscape complex of Mã Pí Lèng. Vietnam's Ministry of Culture, Sports and Tourism has listed the Mã Pí Lèng scenic landscape as a national scenic site, with official descriptions identifying protected areas across communes in the Mèo Vạc area (including Pải Lủng, Pín Vảng, and Xín Cái).

Management attention in the corridor has also focused on visitor-facing construction and viewpoint infrastructure, including the fit of roadside works with the surrounding cliff-and-river landscape. In 2019, the ministry issued guidance on landscape impacts and handling of works in the Mã Pí Lèng area, including references to planning, protection-zone considerations, and architectural compatibility with the natural setting.

== Tourism and access ==
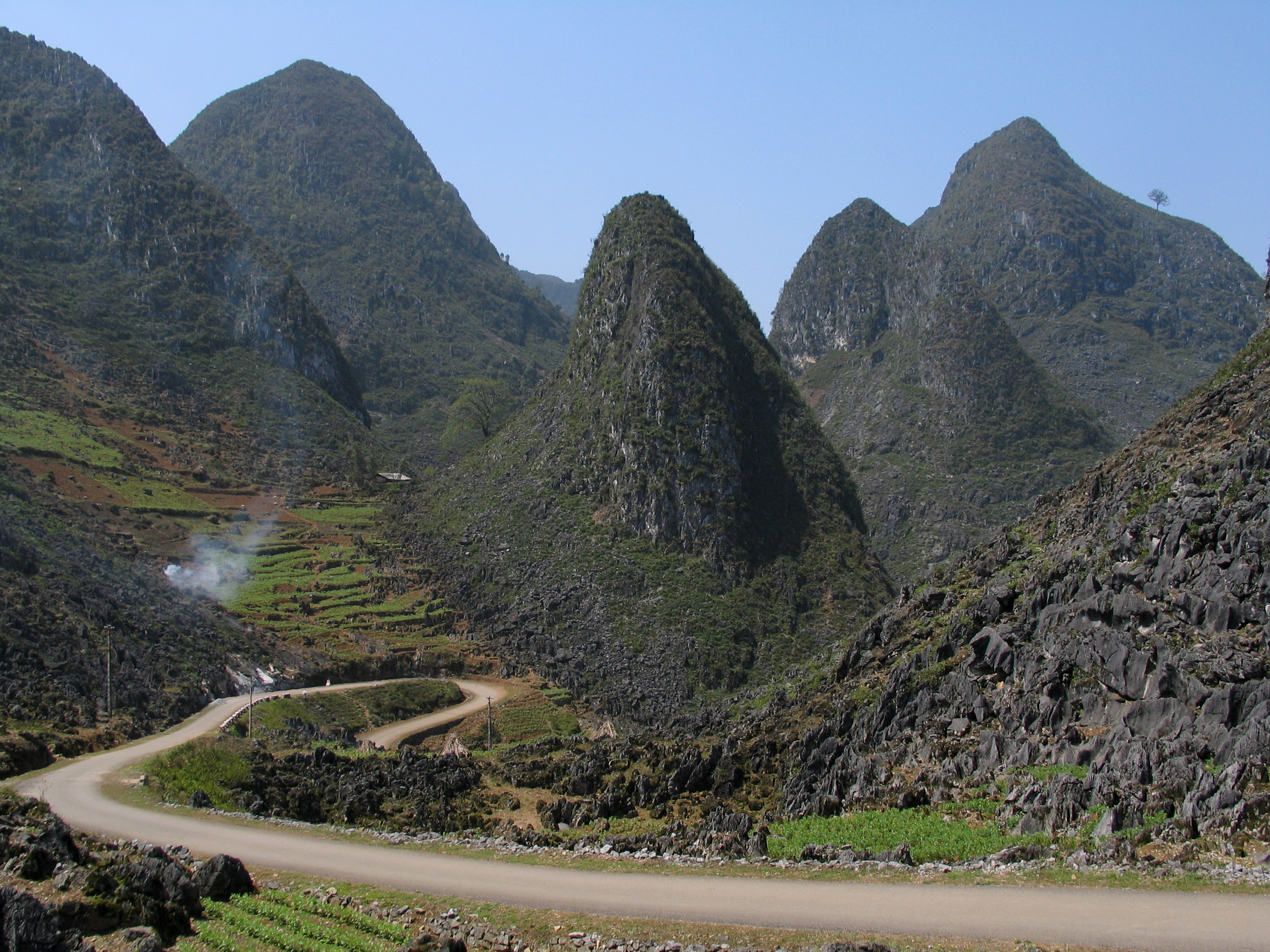
Road section and viewpoints along the pass corridor above the river valley.

Access is commonly organized around roadside pull-offs and short walking approaches from the pass corridor, where viewpoints look down into the river valley and cliff walls. The canyon is regularly highlighted as a key visual feature from these vantages, alongside the tight river bends on the valley floor.

The area is frequently visited as part of loop-style itineraries that include plateau towns and passes, with stops timed around weather and visibility. Visitor guidance for the corridor emphasizes exposed terrain and narrow walking sections near drop-offs, especially when moving between viewpoints or stopping along the highway to photograph the river corridor below.

== Administrative changes ==
Province-level labels used in secondary coverage of the canyon have changed due to a post-2025 administrative reorganization. Under Resolution No. 202/2025/QH15 on provincial-level administrative units, the former provinces of Hà Giang and Tuyên Quang were reorganized, with the new provincial administration operating from July 1, 2025.

== Gallery ==
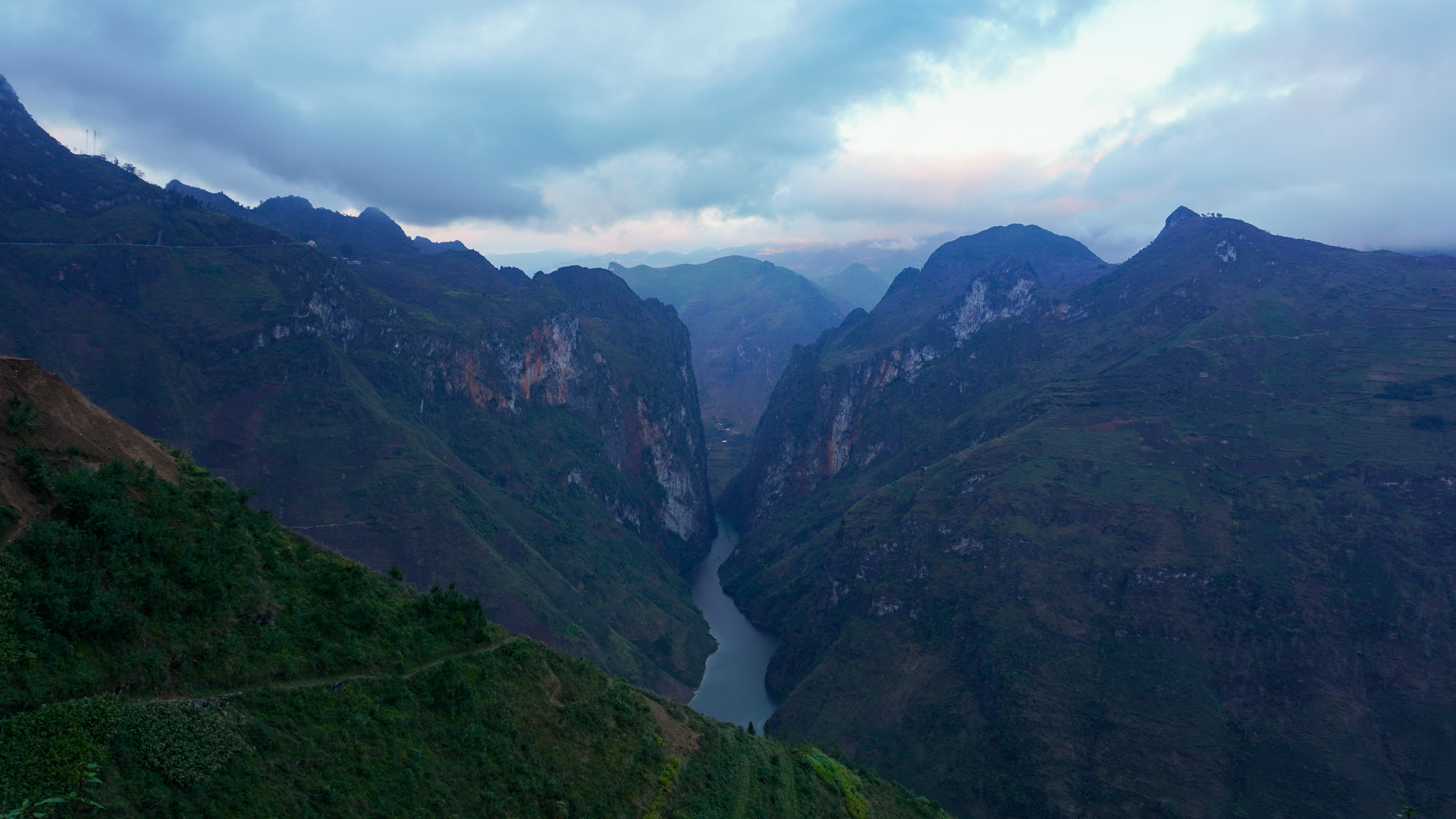
Canyon walls above the Nho Quế river corridor.

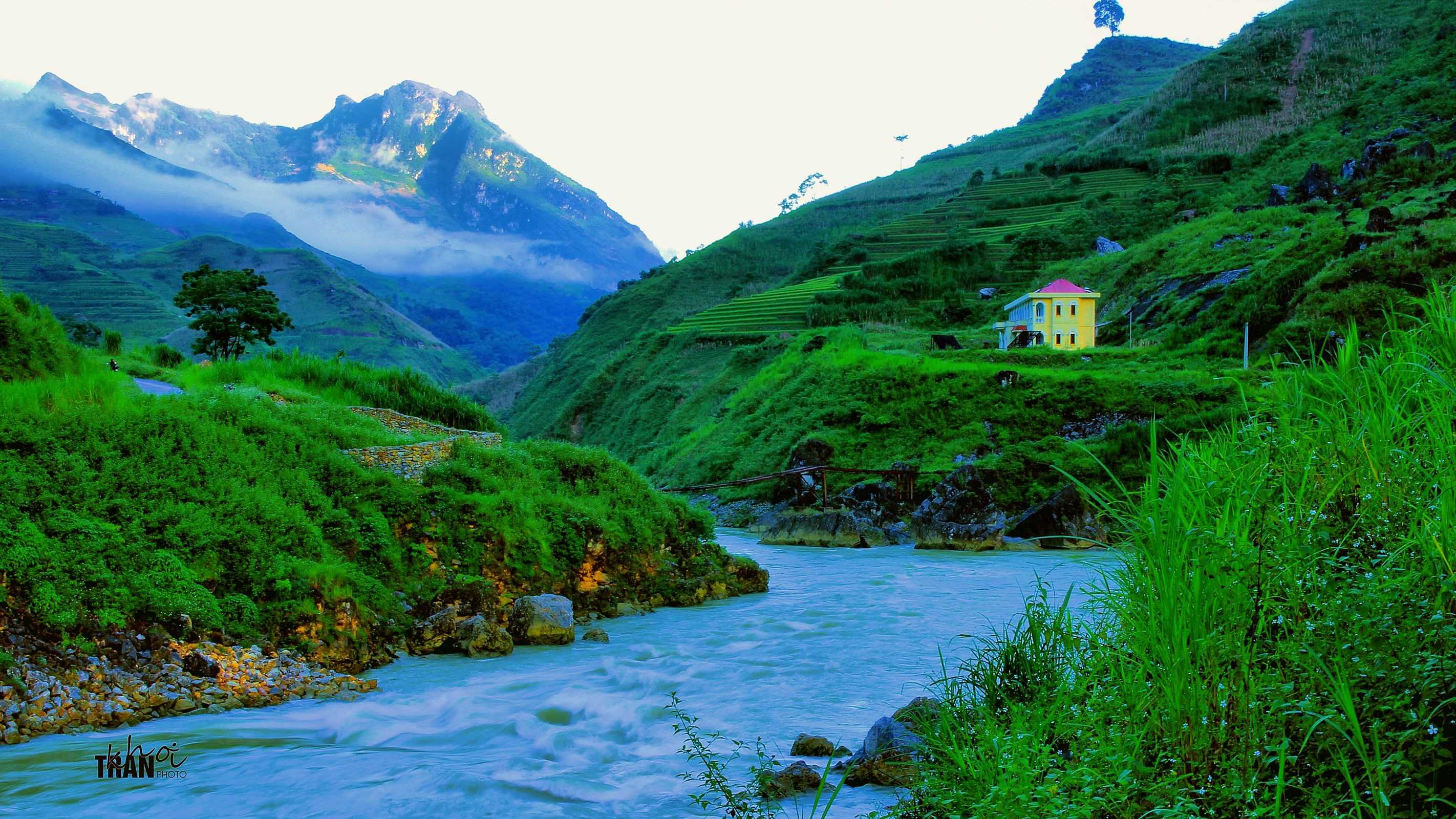
The Nho Quế river below the plateau road.

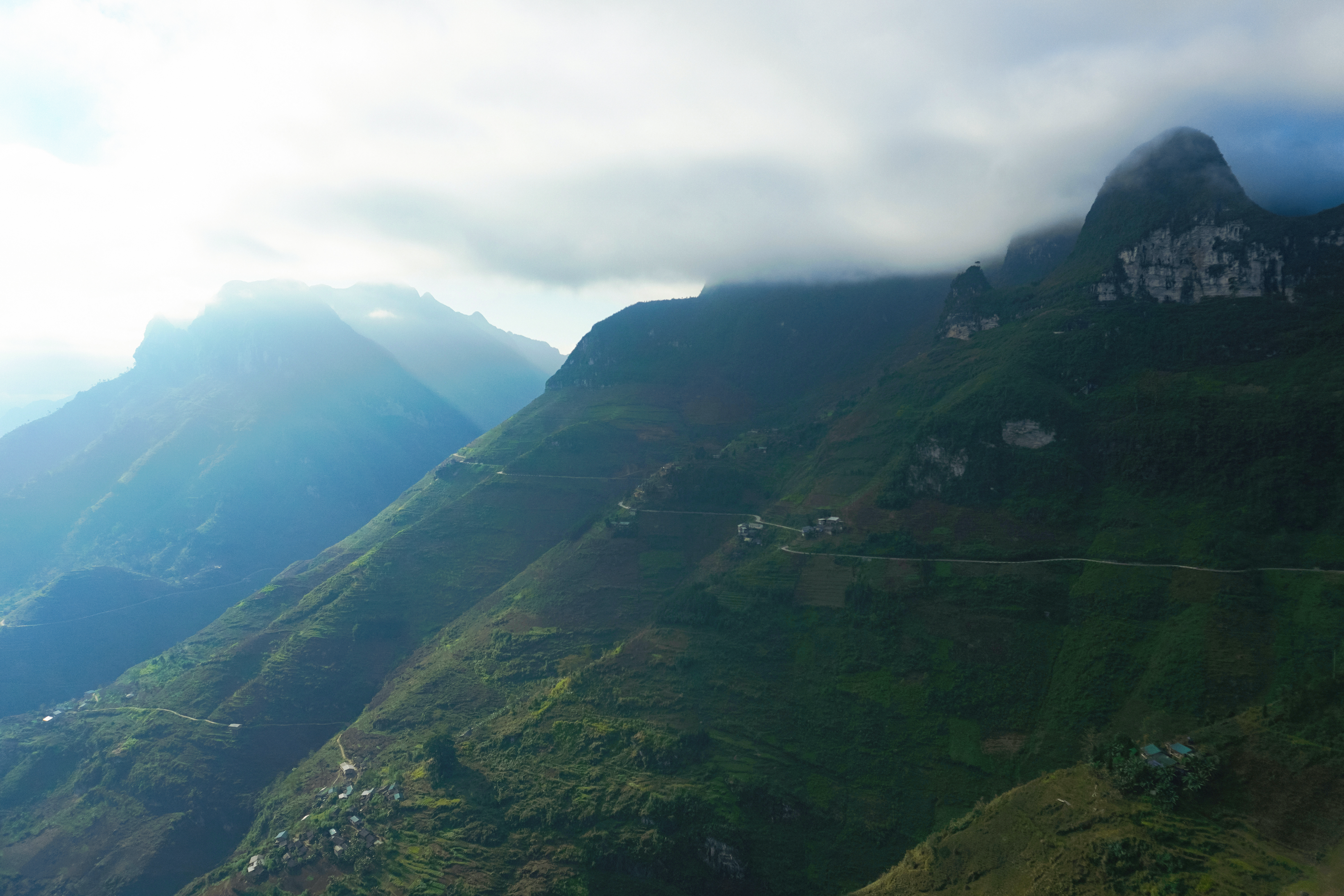
The cliffside road alignment above the gorge.
