= Happiness Road =

Vietnamese mountain road built 1959–1965, now part of National Highway 4C

Happiness Road Con đường Hạnh Phúc
- Đường National Highway 4C
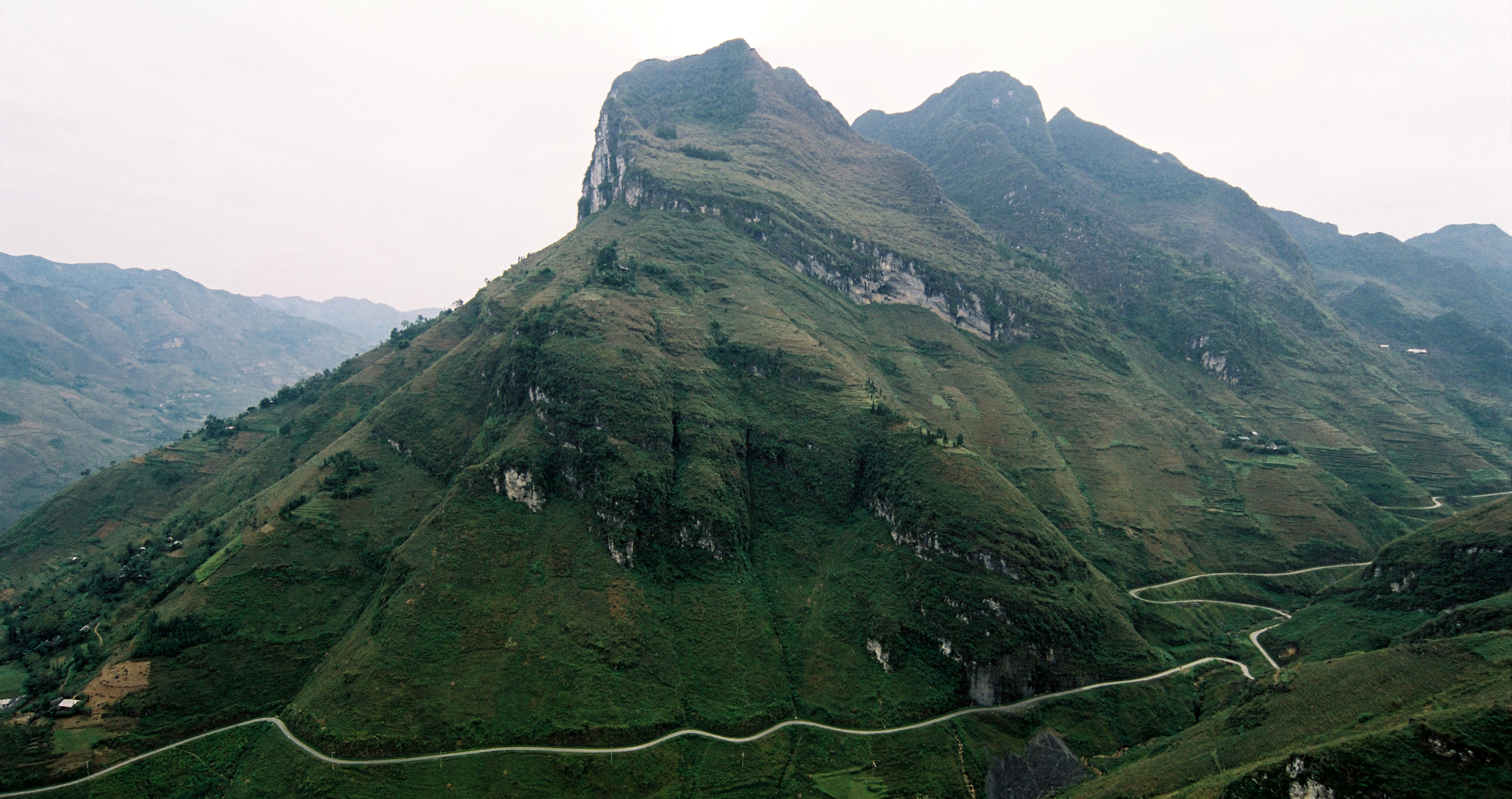

Route information
- Existed: 1959–present
- History: Built 1959–1965

Major junctions
- Southwest end: Hà Giang City
- Northeast end: Mèo Vạc

Location
- Country: Vietnam

Highway system
- Transport in Vietnam

Happiness Road (Con đường Hạnh Phúc) is the popular name for the mountain road corridor that links Hà Giang City with the Đồng Văn Karst Plateau area in northern Vietnam, including Quản Bạ, Yên Minh, Đồng Văn, and Mèo Vạc. Built between 1959 and 1965, the road is commonly identified with the modern alignment of National Highway 4C across the plateau. The name is associated with Ho Chi Minh, who referred to the project as the "Happiness Road" in 1961.

The corridor includes the cliffside segment over Mã Pí Lèng Pass, above the Nho Quế River gorge and the Tú Sản canyon. The surrounding plateau forms part of the UNESCO Global Geoparks network.

== Name and terminology ==
In Vietnamese, the name is Con đường Hạnh Phúc ("Road of Happiness"). In English-language travel and news sources, the road is commonly called the "Happiness Road". Some English-language Vietnamese sources also use the transliteration "Hanh Phuc Road". Accounts of the road-building project describe Ho Chi Minh as applying the name during a 1961 visit to the area.

== Background and route ==
Happiness Road is the principal overland route connecting Hà Giang City to the limestone plateau towns in northern Vietnam, running through Quản Bạ, Yên Minh, Đồng Văn, and Mèo Vạc along the corridor now signed as National Highway 4C. The route is commonly described as about 184–185 km in length from Hà Giang City to the plateau terminus area in Mèo Vạc. The plateau landscape is dominated by limestone karst terrain and steep relief, and the Đồng Văn plateau is listed in the UNESCO Global Geoparks network.

A core scenic segment follows the ridge-and-cliff alignment over Mã Pí Lèng Pass, where the road runs above the gorge of the Nho Quế River corridor and overlooks the Tú Sản canyon setting. Before road construction, travel in the plateau relied largely on footpaths and packhorse tracks.

== Construction (1959–1965) ==
Construction began in 1959 and relied heavily on manual rock cutting in steep karst terrain along the plateau corridor that is now signed as National Highway 4C. Labor mobilization combined youth volunteer brigades (thanh niên xung phong) with local civilian labor, including ethnic minority groups along the route. The segment between Đồng Văn and Mèo Vạc across Mã Pí Lèng involved prolonged cliffside rock cutting above the Nho Quế River gorge; ministry documentation associated with the 2009 national monument listing links the pass worksite to the road-building effort.

The road was completed in 1965, with some sources specifying March 1965 for completion of the full corridor after two construction phases.

== Role in regional access and tourism ==
The road is integrated into the multi-day travel circuit marketed as the Hà Giang Loop. The Mã Pí Lèng segment is frequently associated with viewpoints into the Nho Quế River gorge and the Tú Sản canyon landscape.

== Commemoration ==
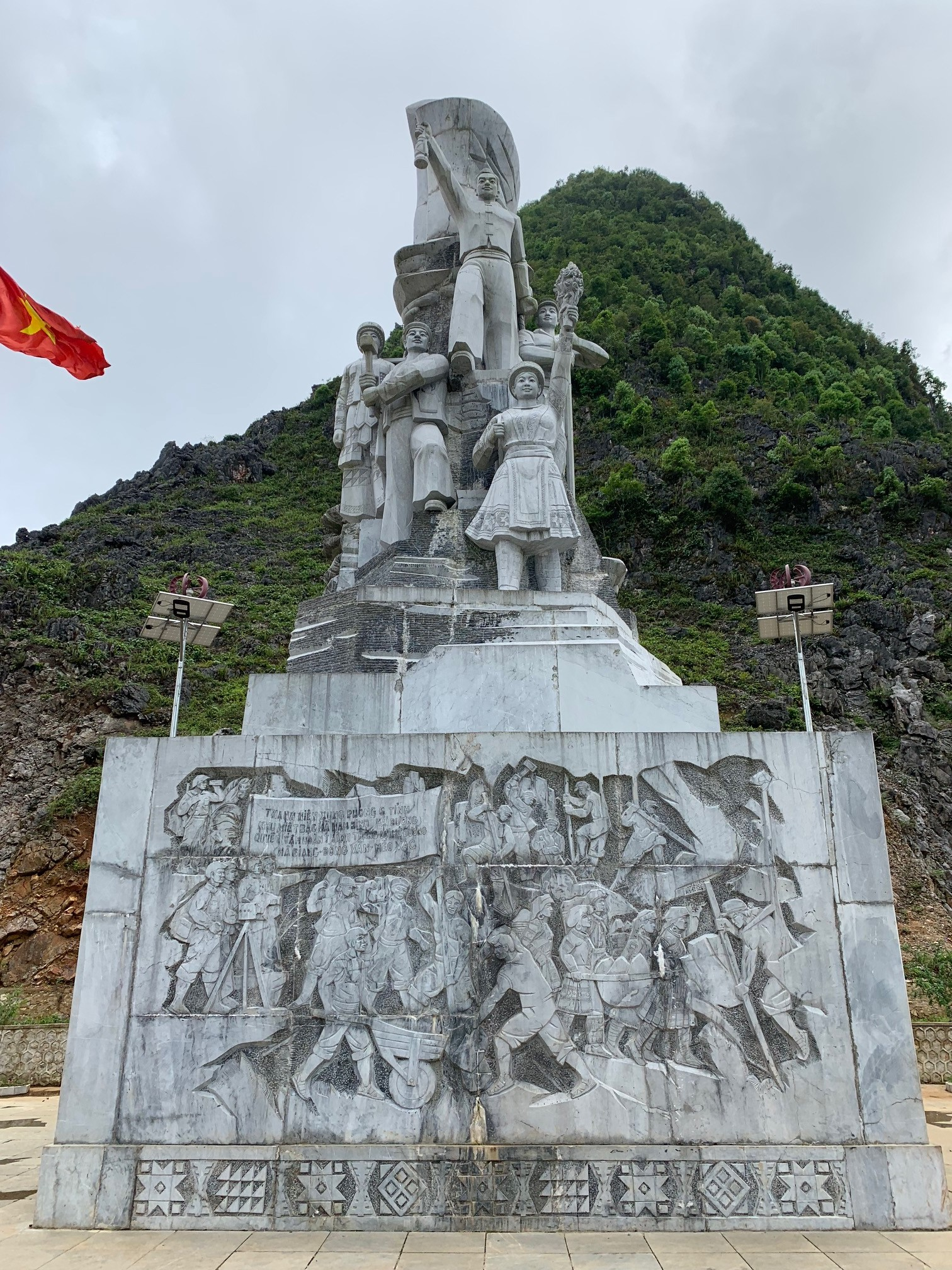
The Young Volunteers Monument at Ma Pi Leng Pass, built to honor the youth volunteers who helped construct the Happiness Road.

Commemoration along the corridor includes monuments and interpretive stops tied to the youth volunteer brigades and local labor mobilized during construction. The Mã Pí Lèng pass-and-gorge setting is listed as a national-level scenic landscape monument, and it is commonly treated as part of the broader road corridor's commemorative landscape.

The Young Volunteers Monument at Mã Pí Lèng Pass and adjacent "memory station" displays are described as memorial sites linked to the road-building labor history.

== Administrative change ==
Since 1 July 2025, the former provinces of Hà Giang and Tuyên Quang have been merged into an expanded Tuyên Quang province under National Assembly Resolution No. 202/2025/QH15; sources predating the change commonly describe the route as being in Hà Giang province.

== See also ==
- National Highway 4C
- Đồng Văn Karst Plateau
- Mã Pí Lèng Pass
- Nho Quế River
- Hà Giang Loop
