= Mã Pí Lèng Pass =

Mountain pass in Tuyên Quang province, Vietnam

- Đèo Mã Pí Lèng
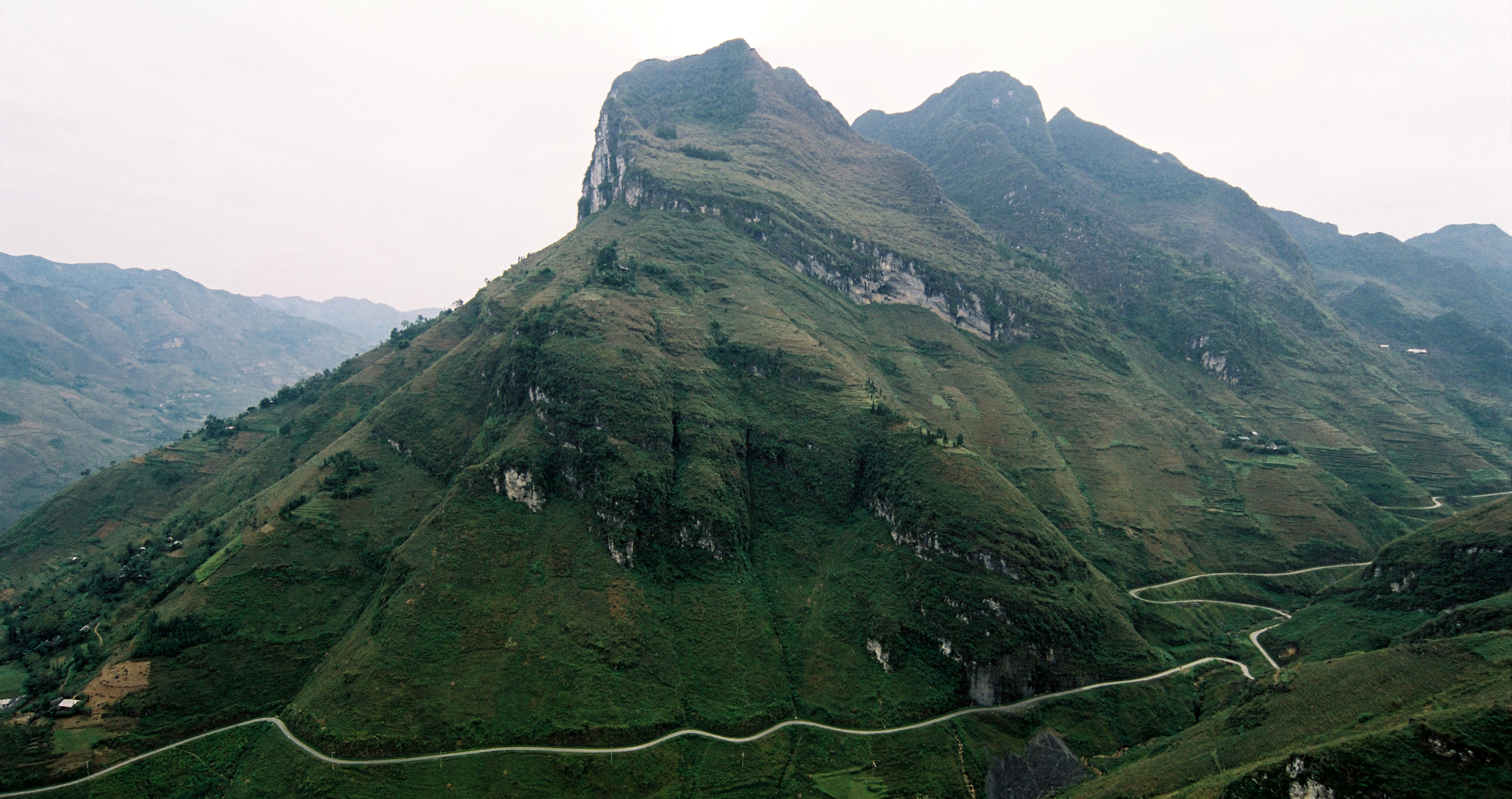
- A view of Mã Pí Lèng Pass

- Location within Vietnam
- Elevation: 1,500 m (4,900 ft)
- Traversed by: National Highway 4C

Location
- Location: Mèo Vạc, Tuyên Quang province (formerly Hà Giang province), Vietnam
- Range: Đồng Văn Karst Plateau
- Coordinates: 23°14′27″N 105°24′39″E

Mã Pí Lèng Pass (Đèo Mã Pí Lèng) is a mountain pass on National Highway 4C in far northern Vietnam, on the route between Đồng Văn and Mèo Vạc in Tuyên Quang province (formerly Hà Giang province). The pass reaches about 1,500 meters above sea level and sits on the winding mountain road across the Đồng Văn Karst Plateau, a karst limestone landscape of ridges, sinkholes, and steep escarpments.

Lookouts near the crest overlook the Nho Quế River valley and the Tú Sản canyon, where the river runs through a narrow gorge beneath near-vertical cliffs. The pass lies within the Đồng Văn Karst Plateau Geopark and is known for its karst geomorphology and highland scenery.

The road over Mã Pí Lèng was built as part of the "Happiness Road" (Con đường Hạnh Phúc), completed in the mid-1960s to connect Hà Giang City with the plateau areas. In 2009, Vietnam's Ministry of Culture, Sports and Tourism listed the Mã Pí Lèng scenic landscape as a national-level monument covering parts of several communes in Mèo Vạc. The pass is also a major stop on the Hà Giang Loop travel circuit.

== Naming ==
The pass name appears in several Vietnamese spellings, including Mã Pí Lèng and Mã Pì Lèng, alongside variants such as Mã Pỉ Lèng and Mả Pì Lèng. The name has been glossed as "the horse's nose bridge" (sống mũi ngựa). The Trí Thức & Cuộc Sống (Knowledge & Life) article that interviewed linguists gives several explanations for the name, including an account that Mã Pí Lèng originally referred to a former village rather than the mountain pass itself.

== Location and topography ==
Mã Pí Lèng Pass follows National Highway 4C between Đồng Văn and Mèo Vạc in the Đồng Văn Karst Plateau area of former Hà Giang province (now Tuyên Quang province) in northern Vietnam. The crest stands at about 1,500 meters above sea level. Across roughly 20 kilometers, the highway threads along steep slopes above the Nho Quế River gorge.

The scenic landscape tied to the pass includes the Nho Quế corridor and the Tú Sản canyon, within the geopark's karst terrain. The national monument listing defines a protected area extending across parts of Pải Lủng, Pả Vi and Xín Cái communes in Mèo Vạc and treats the pass and river gorge as a connected landscape.

Since 1 July 2025, the former provinces of Hà Giang and Tuyên Quang have been merged into an expanded Tuyên Quang province under National Assembly Resolution No. 202/2025/QH15; sources predating the change commonly describe the pass as being in Hà Giang province.

== Geological and geomorphological context ==
=== Karst plateau setting ===
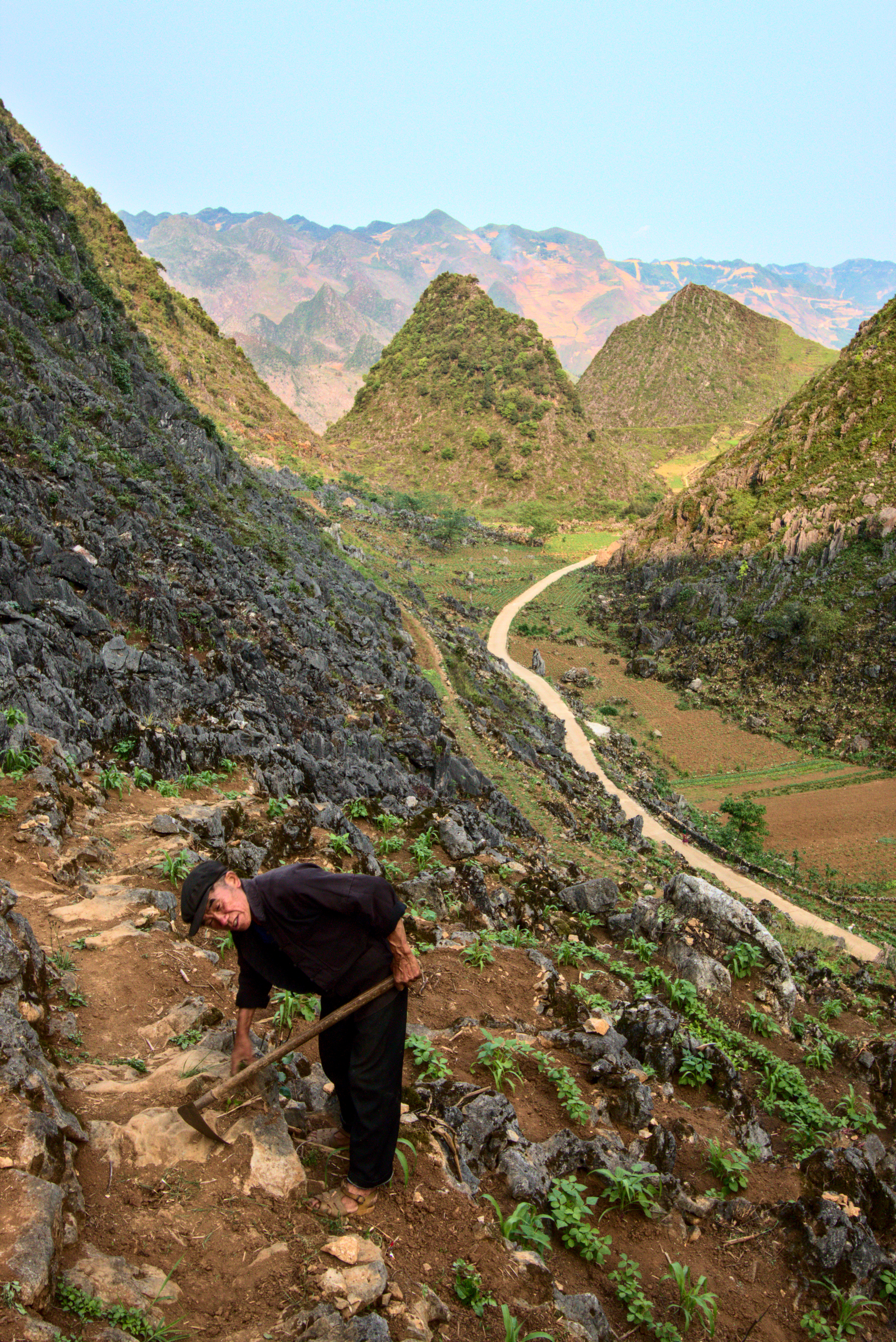
A farmer tending crops on a rocky hillside in the karst landscape of northern Vietnam.

Mã Pí Lèng sits within the karst terrain of the Đồng Văn Karst Plateau. The plateau's surface geology is dominated by limestone, and long-running karst processes have produced steep rock faces, structurally controlled valleys, caves, and sinkholes. The plateau is a UNESCO Global Geopark and was Vietnam's first geopark recognized in the global geopark network.

Fossil localities on the plateau have been described as dating to the hundreds of millions of years. Karst landforms occupy a substantial share of the area (up to about 60%), and sources discussing the geopark's geoheritage include the pass and the Nho Quế gorge corridor among notable landscape expressions.

UNESCO Global Geoparks are designated for internationally significant geological heritage and are managed through an integrated approach that combines conservation, education, and sustainable development for local communities.

=== Nho Quế River gorge and Tú Sản canyon ===
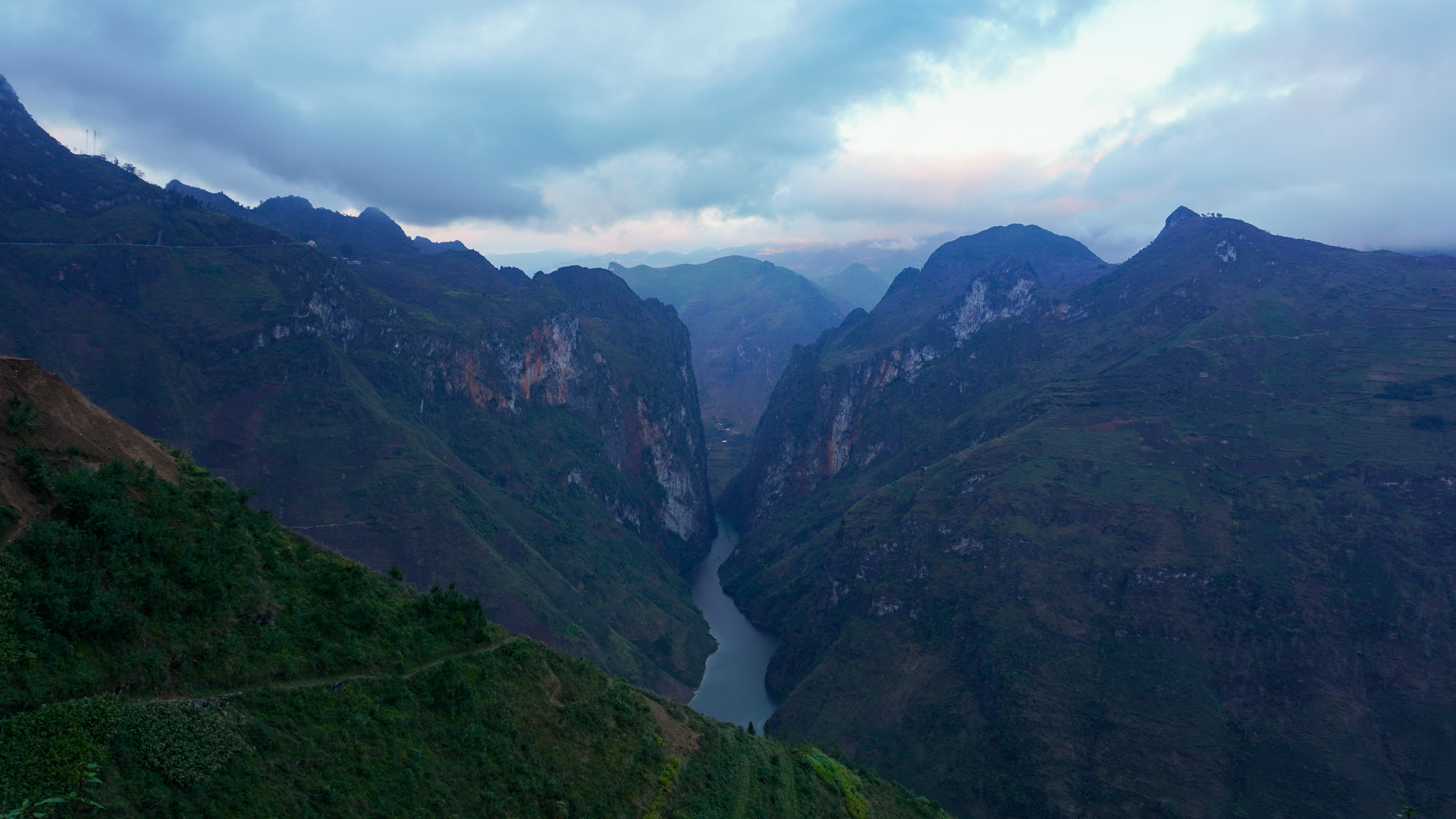
The Nho Quế River cutting through the Tú Sản canyon, seen from Mã Pí Lèng Pass

The Nho Quế River gorge associated with Mã Pí Lèng includes the Tú Sản canyon, a deeply incised limestone gorge that stands out as a geomorphic landmark of the plateau landscape. The monument listing treats the pass-gorge complex and lookout points near the crest as part of the site's scenic value.

Highway 4C runs along cliffside roadcuts above the river corridor at several points, creating ridge-top viewpoints over the gorge and the Tú Sản canyon.

== Road history and the "Happiness Road" ==
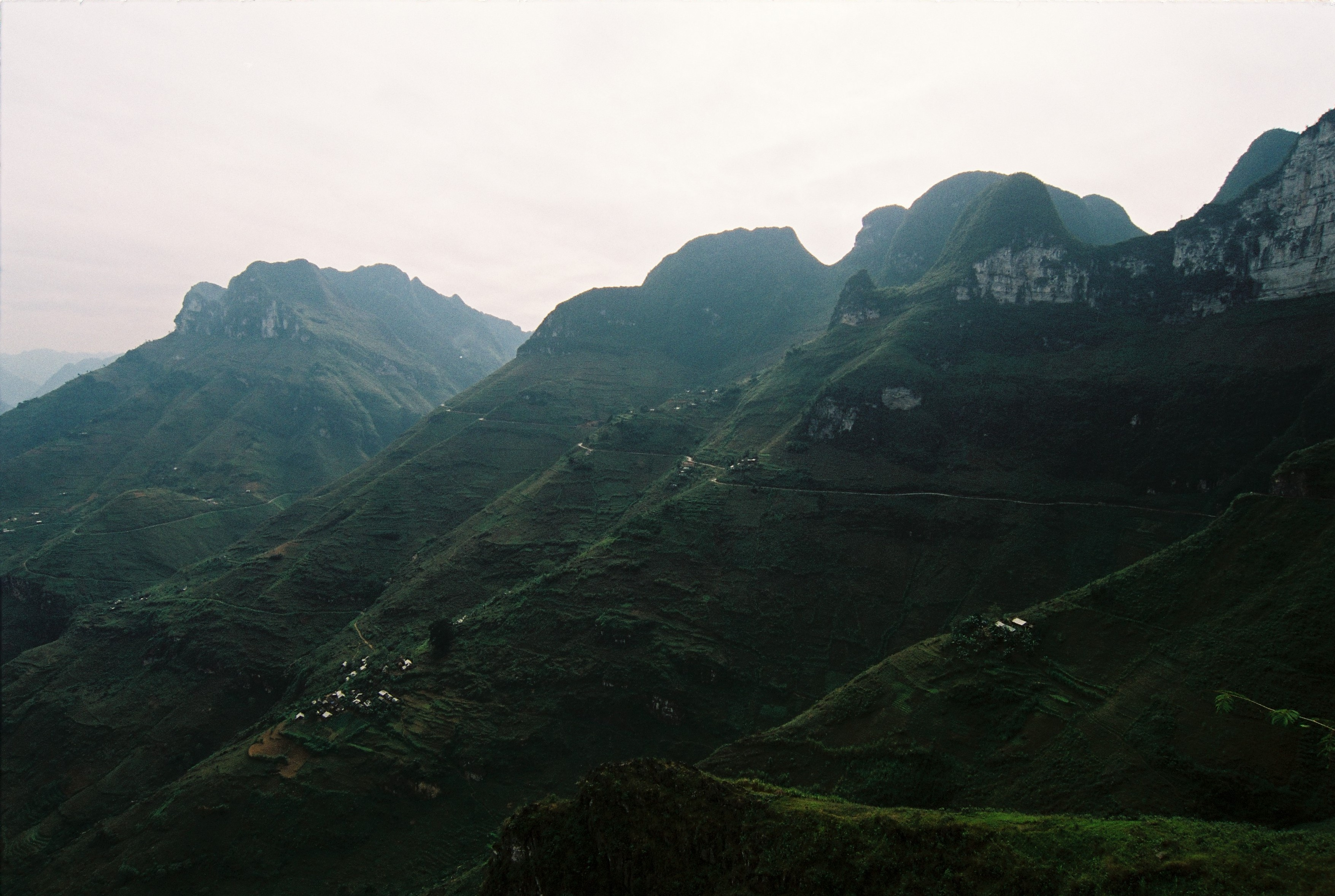
Landscape view of Mã Pí Lèng Pass seen from National Highway 4C

The highway across Mã Pí Lèng forms part of the route known as the "Happiness Road" (Con đường Hạnh Phúc), built from 1959 to 1965 to connect Hà Giang City with plateau areas including Đồng Văn and Mèo Vạc. The route is described as about 184-185 kilometers long, running from Hà Giang City through Quản Bạ and Yên Minh before reaching Đồng Văn and Mèo Vạc. Ho Chi Minh referred to the route as the "Happiness Road" in 1961.

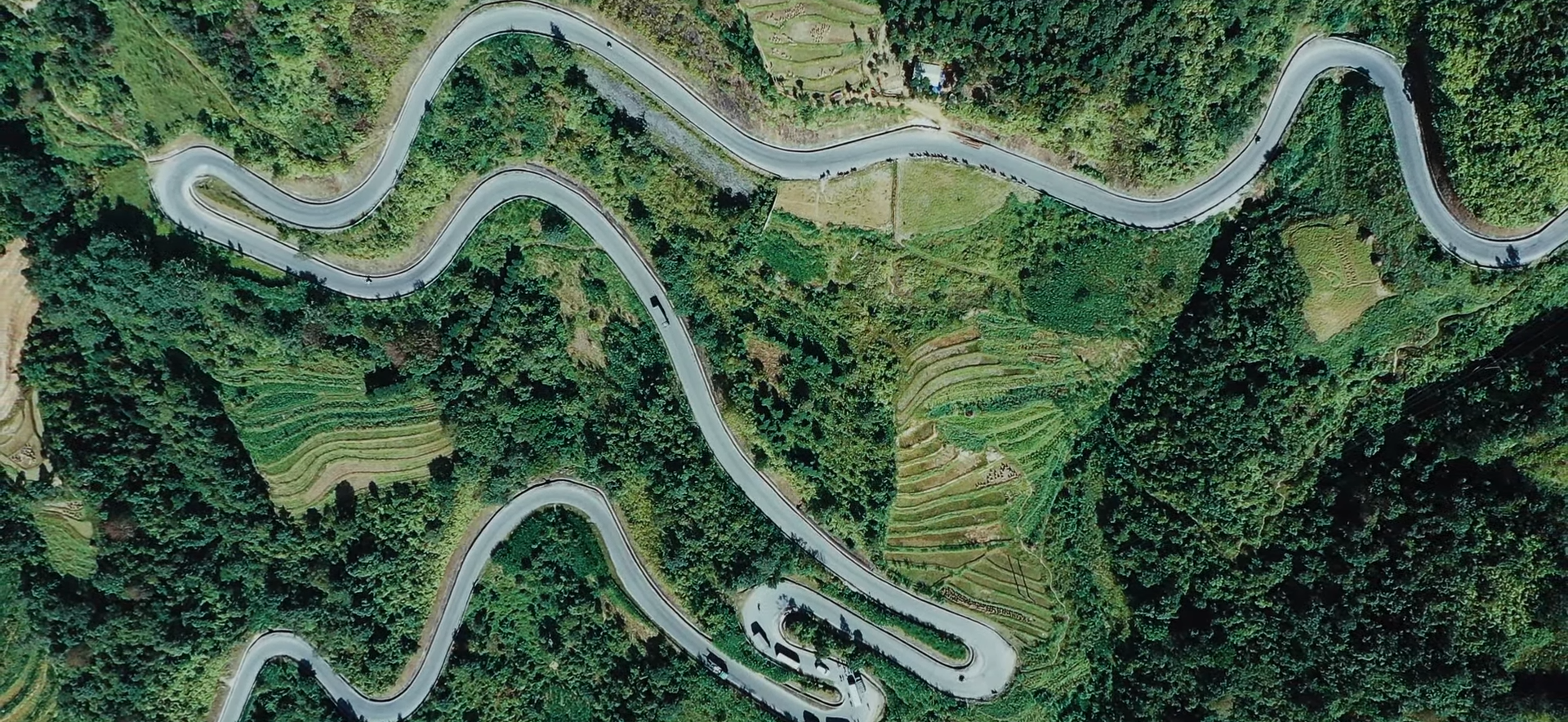
Hairpin bends on the road over Mã Pí Lèng Pass

Before construction, travel across the plateau relied largely on footpaths and packhorse tracks. The project began in 1959 and combined youth volunteer brigades with civilian labor drawn from ethnic minority communities along the route. Accounts of the workforce describe volunteers and civilian laborers from 16 ethnic groups, including the Hmong, Tày, Dao, Nùng, Pu Péo, and Lô Lô. More than 1,300 youth volunteers and more than 1,000 civilian laborers have been reported as taking part. Work on the plateau depended heavily on manual rock cutting and construction in steep terrain.

The most difficult segment was the 21-kilometer section between Đồng Văn and Mèo Vạc across Mã Pí Lèng. Cliffside rock cutting above the Nho Quế River gorge took nearly two years to complete. The 2009 monument ceremony materials also describe more than 1,000 young workers from Mèo Vạc at the Mã Pí Lèng worksite during construction. Commemorative markers for volunteers and youth brigades stand on the pass.

In the 1994 Bradt guidebook Guide to Vietnam, the road through Mã Pí Lèng Pass was described as under repair after sustaining considerable damage from Chinese artillery. The pass landscape was listed as a national monument in 2009 and later became a regular stop on the Hà Giang Loop.

The Mã Pí Lèng road section itself covers roughly 20 kilometers of National Highway 4C between Đồng Văn and Mèo Vạc. In places it follows ridge crests and ledges cut into rock faces, opening viewpoints down to the Nho Quế corridor and the Tú Sản canyon. A narrower older track runs alongside parts of the pass and is primarily used by motorbikes.

== Heritage designation and management ==
=== National monument designation ===
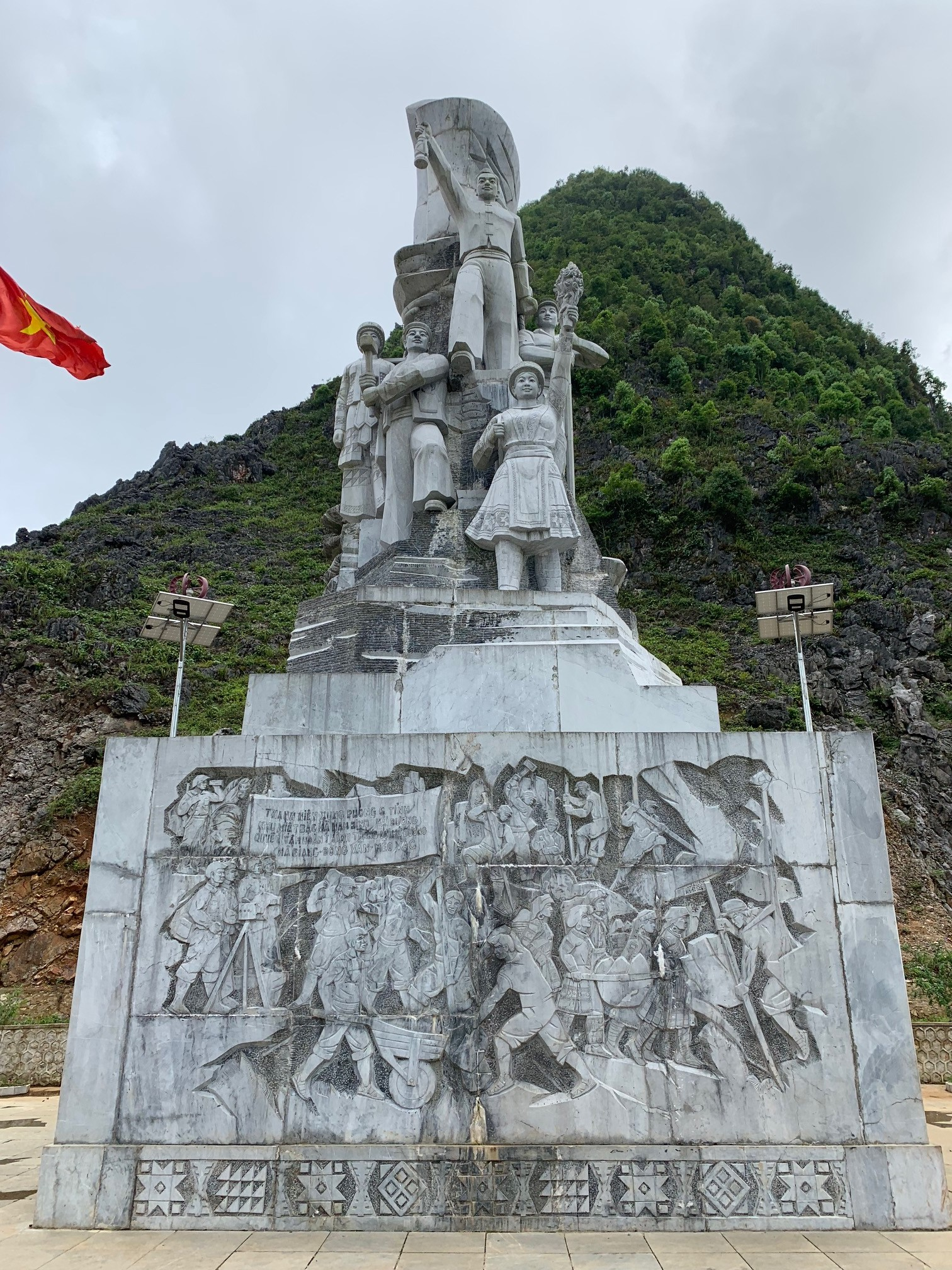
The Young Volunteers Monument at Ma Pi Leng Pass, built to honor the youth volunteers who helped construct the Happiness Road

In 2009, the Ministry of Culture, Sports and Tourism designated the Mã Pí Lèng scenic landscape as a national-level monument under Decision No. 4194/QĐ-BVHTTDL dated November 16, 2009. The listing covers a scenic landscape (danh lam thắng cảnh) centered on the pass crest and the adjacent Nho Quế River gorge, extending across parts of Pải Lủng, Pả Vi and Xín Cái communes in Mèo Vạc. Monument documentation describes the crest at about 1,500 meters above sea level and the protected landscape area as approximately 796 hectares.

The listing frames the pass and gorge as a connected landscape linking cliffside viewpoints to the river corridor below, including the Tú Sản canyon, within the limestone karst of the Đồng Văn plateau. The surrounding plateau is part of the UNESCO Global Geoparks network.

In 2019-2020, a multistory "Panorama" building near the pass prompted ministry statements addressing visual impacts on the heritage landscape and guidance on visitor-serving facilities intended to fit the surrounding scenery.

=== Management and protection framework ===
The pass lies within the Đồng Văn Karst Plateau UNESCO Global Geopark. UNESCO Global Geoparks operate under management plans that integrate conservation, education, and sustainable development; the program also requires periodic revalidation on a four-year cycle.

In 2019, the Ministry of Culture, Sports and Tourism called for visitor infrastructure to follow planning documents for the geopark area and for the monument's landscape setting to be maintained, with coordination involving the Department of Cultural Heritage. The ministry stated that a construction case at the pass was outside Protection Zone II of the national monument but within the geopark's planning area and cited Prime Minister decisions 310/QĐ-TTg, 438/QĐ-TTg, and 2075/QĐ-TTg as relevant planning instruments. It referenced Article 36 of Vietnam's Law on Cultural Heritage regarding projects outside protected zones that may affect a monument's landscape setting and called for an overall layout plan for the monument area and surrounding viewpoints. A 2020 follow-up urged Hà Giang provincial authorities to report handling results and coordinate enforcement by relevant departments.

== Visitor facilities, tourism, and development ==
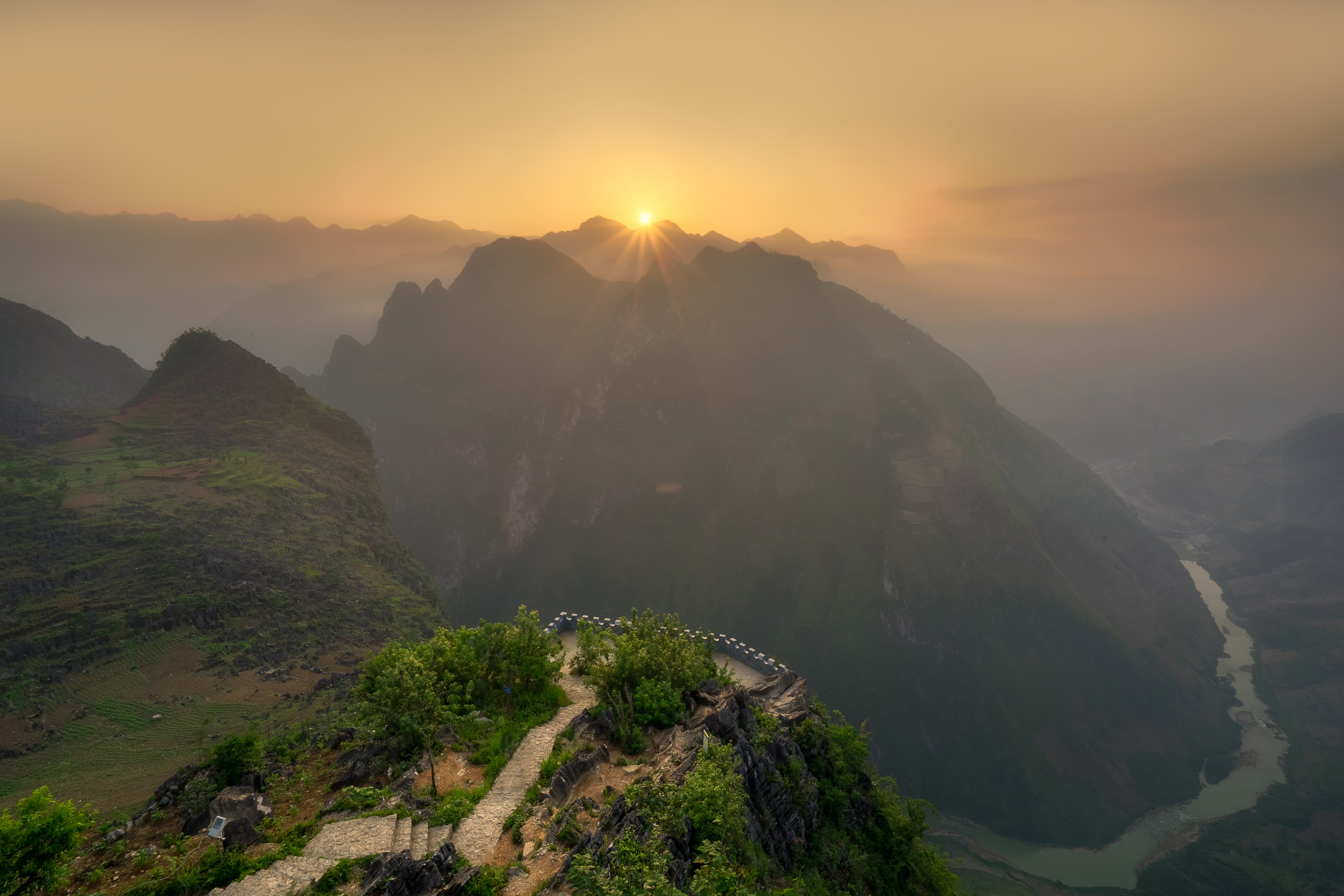
A tourism viewpoint at Mã Pí Lèng Pass overlooking the Nho Quế River

As the high point on the Đồng Văn plateau section of National Highway 4C, the pass is a regular stop on the Hà Giang Loop. Viewpoints near the crest and along the Nho Quế side look out over layered limestone ridges and the river gorge, with sightlines toward the Tú Sản canyon. Tour itineraries described in travel coverage include boat trips on the Nho Quế and short hikes to named lookouts such as "God Cliff". Roadside cafes and small service points have clustered near major viewpoints as visitor numbers have grown.

In 2019, a multistory "Panorama" complex built near the pass, combining a cafe and lodging, became a focal point for debate over unpermitted construction and visual impacts on the scenic landscape. Authorities ordered the operation to stop while the case was reviewed. The culture ministry later proposed redesigning the site as a controlled scenic stop with architecture intended to better fit the surroundings, while urging local authorities to address violations along the pass corridor.

== See also ==
- Đồng Văn Karst Plateau
- Nho Quế River
- National Highway 4C
- Mèo Vạc
- Đồng Văn
- Hà Giang Loop
- Khau Vai Love Market
