= National Highway 4C =

National highway in Hà Giang province, Vietnam

National Highway 4C
- Quốc lộ 4C
- Happiness Road

Location
- Country: Vietnam

Highway system
- Transport in Vietnam

National Highway 4C (Quốc lộ 4C) is a national highway in Hà Giang province in northern Vietnam. It links Hà Giang City with the highland areas of the Dong Van Karst Plateau Geopark and includes the road section over Mã Pí Lèng Pass. The highway is widely associated with the route commonly known as the "Happiness Road" (Con đường Hạnh Phúc), built from 1959 to 1965 as a road-access project for the plateau areas.

== Route and setting ==
National Highway 4C runs from Hà Giang City north and east across the province's karst plateau, connecting Quản Bạ, Yên Minh, Đồng Văn, and Mèo Vạc. Tourism coverage has treated the "Happiness Road" corridor as roughly 184–185 kilometers, while later rehabilitation planning has treated Highway 4C as roughly 200 kilometers of roadway targeted for repair and selective widening in steep terrain.

A core scenic segment runs across the Đồng Văn plateau and is closely associated with the Dong Van Karst Plateau Geopark, which is part of the UNESCO Global Geoparks network. The best-known pass section is the road over Mã Pí Lèng Pass, overlooking the gorge of the Nho Quế River, with viewpoints along cliffside alignment above the river corridor.

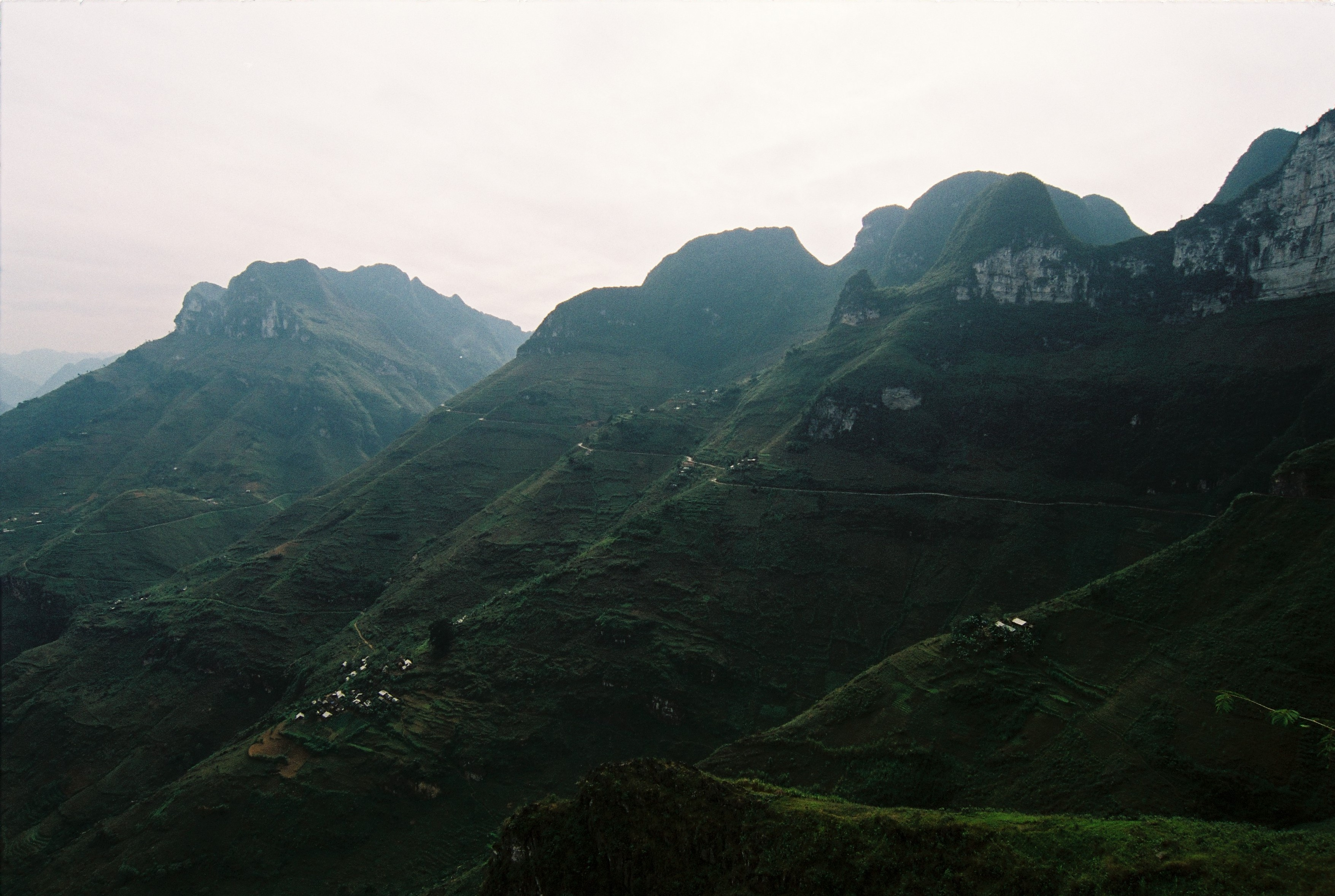
Landscape view of Mã Pí Lèng Pass seen from National Highway 4C.

== Construction and history ==
Before large-scale road construction, travel between highland communes and market towns in the plateau areas relied largely on footpaths and packhorse tracks. The main construction period of the "Happiness Road" project is dated to 1959–1965, providing road access from Hà Giang City to plateau areas including Đồng Văn and Mèo Vạc.

The project mobilized youth volunteer brigades and civilian labor from ethnic minority communities along the route corridor. VietnamPlus has listed participation by laborers from multiple ethnic groups, including the Hmong, Tày, Dao, Nùng, Pu Péo, and Lô Lô. Work on the plateau included extensive manual rock cutting in steep terrain, particularly on cliffside segments near Mã Pí Lèng Pass.

Reporting tied to the 2009 national-monument recognition of the Mã Pí Lèng landscape has stated that more than 1,000 youth volunteers and local residents were mobilized at the Mã Pí Lèng worksite and described the pass segment as taking nearly two years to complete because of sustained cliffside rock cutting above the Nho Quế River gorge. In 1961, Ho Chi Minh referred to the project as the "Happiness Road". A 1994 Bradt guidebook stated that the road through Mã Pí Lèng Pass was being repaired after sustaining damage described as coming from Chinese artillery.

== Designation, upgrades, and road conditions ==
The highway's Mã Pí Lèng landscape section was listed as a national monument in 2009 under Vietnam's cultural heritage administration, a designation used in provincial tourism promotion and management of viewpoints along the pass corridor.

Repairs and upgrading work have included stabilization and rehabilitation in steep terrain. Government planning published in 2025 described repair work and selective widening intended to improve safety and capacity, including segments planned for widening and the application of different technical classes depending on terrain constraints.

The pass section at Mã Pí Lèng Pass includes narrow mountain-road alignment, sustained exposure above a gorge, steep gradients, and tight curves, increasing technical demands for drivers in fog and heavy rain.

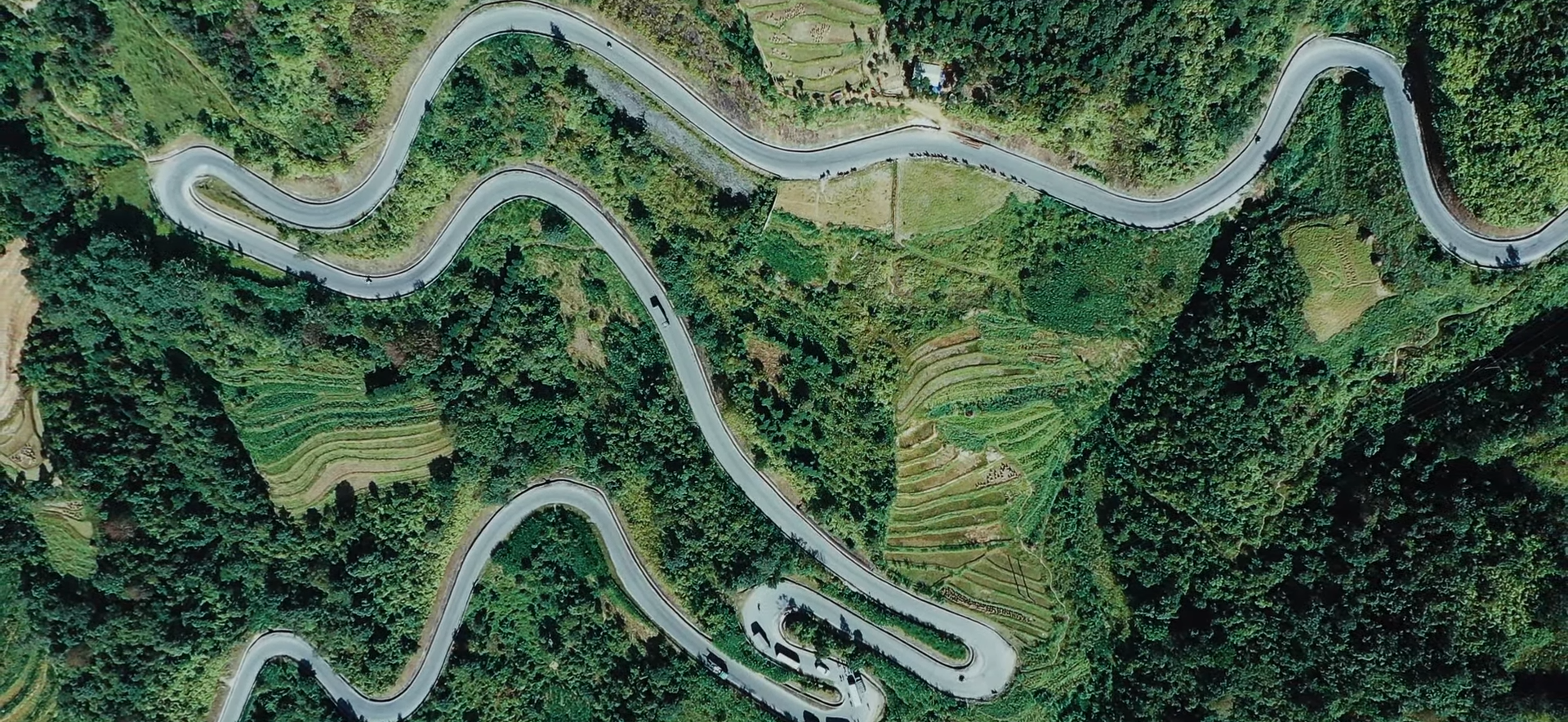
Hairpin bends on the road over Mã Pí Lèng Pass.

== Tourism and use ==
National Highway 4C forms part of the road network marketed to visitors as the backbone corridor for the travel circuit known as the Hà Giang Loop. The plateau corridor is linked in tourism promotion to karst scenery, upland towns, and viewpoints over the Nho Quế River gorge, with Mã Pí Lèng treated as a signature stop.

Provincial tourism plans have treated visitor growth as an economic priority, with VietnamPlus reporting a provincial target of about 3.5 million visitors for 2025 and reporting more than 848,000 arrivals in the first quarter of that year.

Expanded travel services on routes using Highway 4C have included guided trips marketed as "easy rider" services, in which local drivers operate motorcycles while visitors ride as passengers. A separate policy strand has addressed funding for infrastructure and conservation in geopark areas, including discussion of fees for overnight stays in the geopark area.

== Commemoration ==
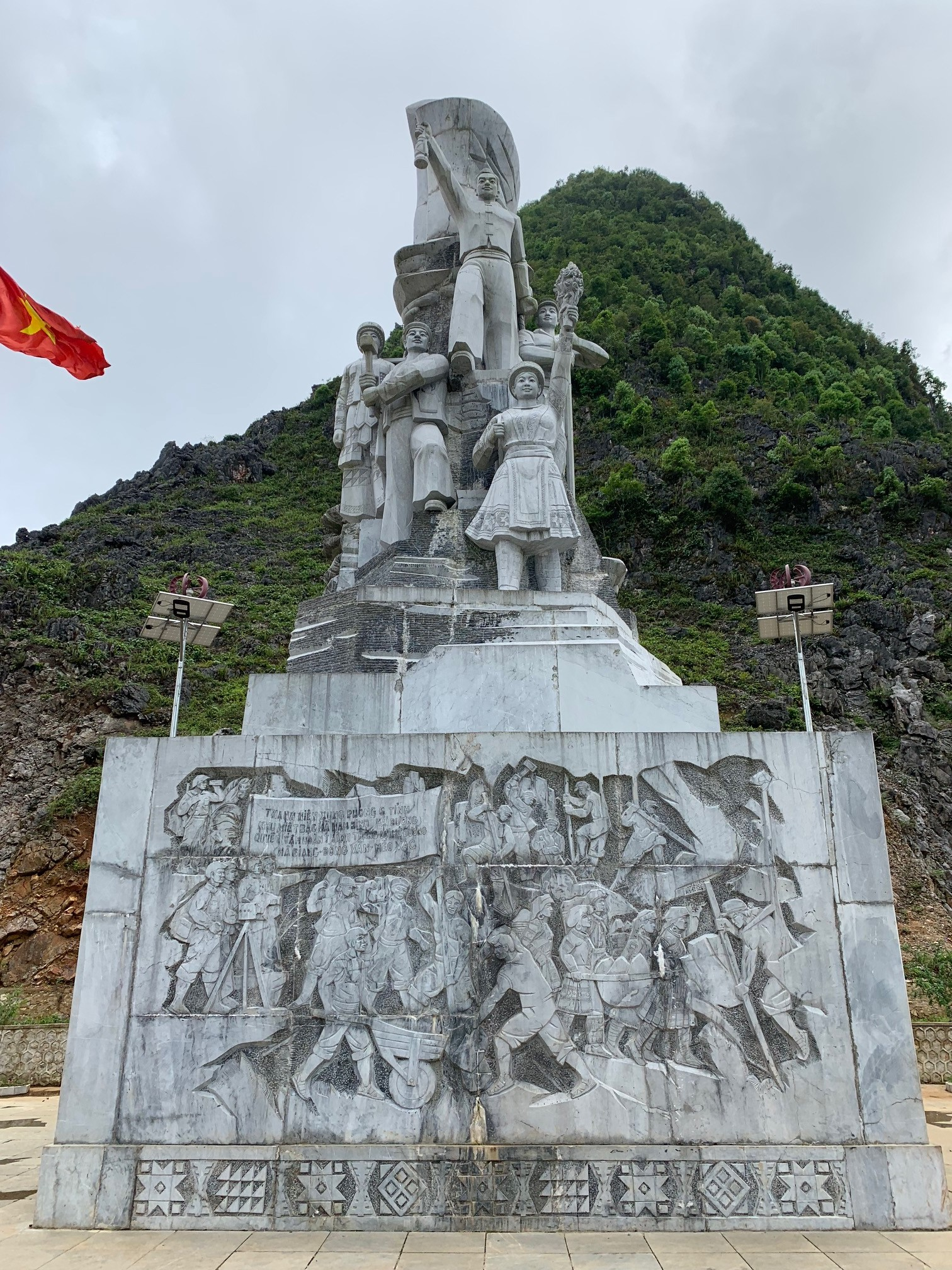
The Young Volunteers Monument at Ma Pi Leng Pass, built to honor the youth volunteers who helped construct the Happiness Road.

In addition to the 2009 national-monument listing for the Mã Pí Lèng landscape section, Vietnamese reporting has described commemorative efforts tied to the construction period, including the placement of markers and monuments associated with the youth volunteer brigades who worked on the plateau road corridor. A 2014 report in Nhân Dân described plans for a monument to the youth volunteers at Mã Pí Lèng in connection with anniversary commemorations of the Happiness Road construction period.

== See also ==
- National Highway 4 (Vietnam)
- Hà Giang Loop
- Mã Pí Lèng Pass
- Dong Van Karst Plateau Geopark
