= Ha Giang Loop =

Motorcycle touring route in northern Vietnam

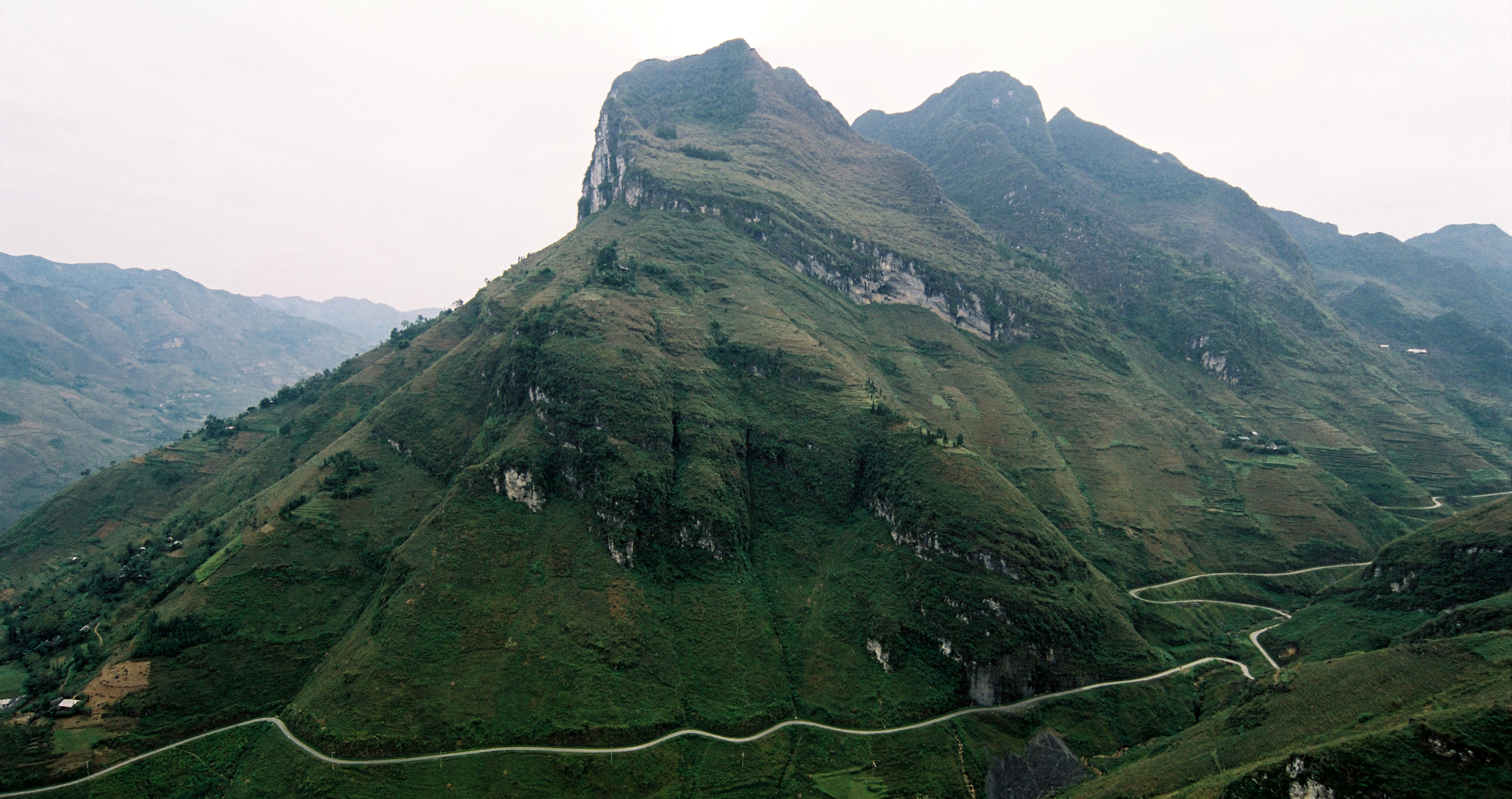
- A view of the road at Mã Pí Lèng Pass, a well-known stop on the route.
- Length: About 350 km (220 mi)
- Location: Ha Giang Province, Vietnam
- Trailheads: Ha Giang City
- Use: Motorcycle touring

Ha Giang Loop is an informal road-trip route in northern Vietnam, typically traveled by motorcycle. The loop is commonly described as beginning and ending in Ha Giang City and connecting mountain roads through districts of Ha Giang Province, including Quan Ba District, Yen Minh District, Dong Van District, and Meo Vac District.

== Overview ==
The Ha Giang Loop is commonly described as a roughly 350-kilometer circuit that takes several days to complete and is frequently done by motorcycle. The route's main north–south and east–west backbone is commonly tied to National Highway 4C. A core scenic segment follows the plateau highway associated with the "Happiness Road" name (Con đường Hạnh Phúc).

In the 2020s, the loop received increased coverage in online travel media and short-form video. Travel services include self-guided rentals and packaged tours, including "easy rider" trips where local drivers operate motorcycles while visitors ride as passengers.

== Route ==
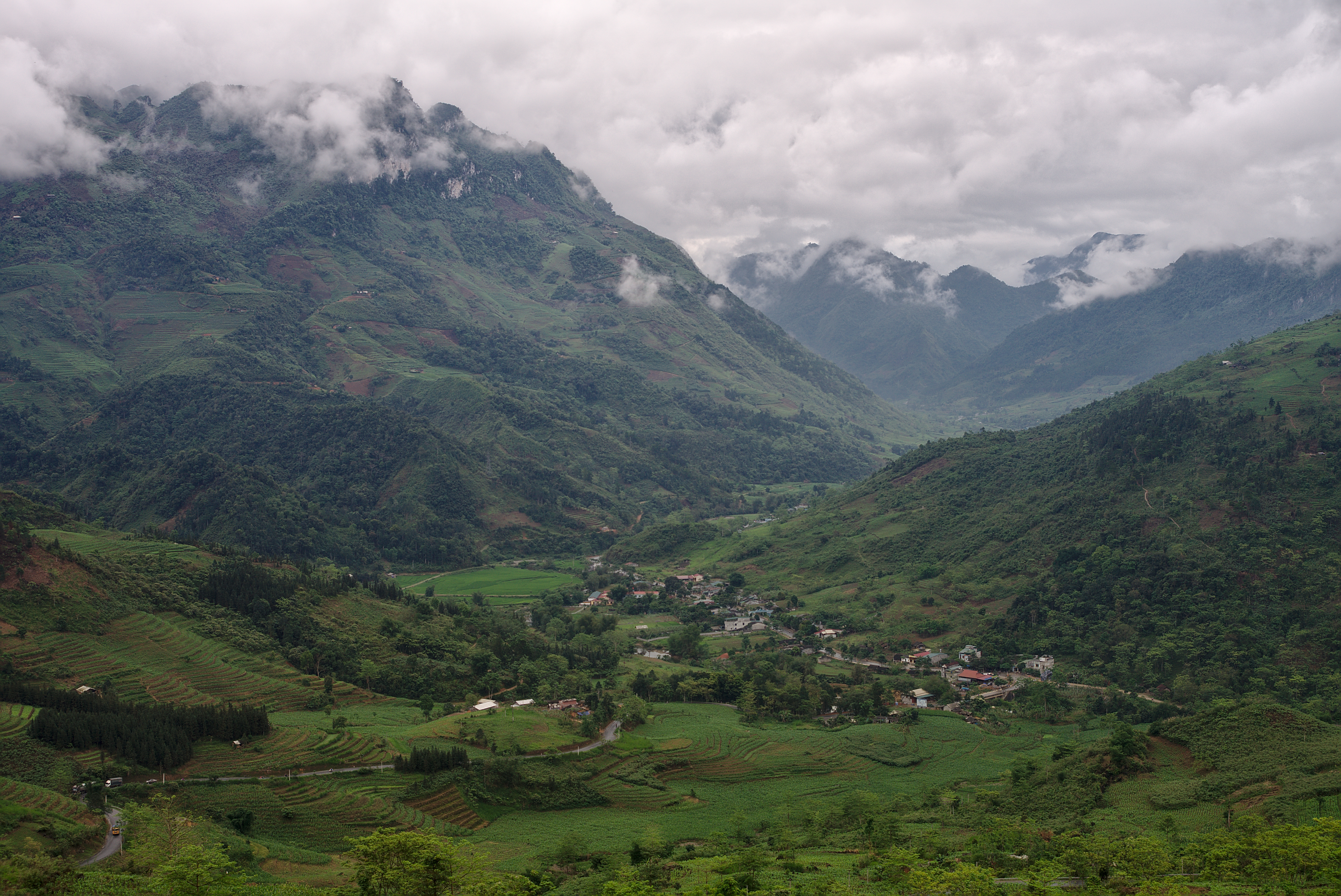
Road on Bac Sum Pass (Dốc Bắc Sum) on the approach to Quan Ba District.

A common itinerary starts in Ha Giang City and follows roads north and east through Quan Ba, Yen Minh, Dong Van, and Meo Vac before returning toward the provincial capital. The route is typically organized as a multi-day circuit with overnight stops in upland towns and villages along the plateau corridor. Travelers often schedule the loop around daylight riding time and weather, since fog and rain can reduce visibility on passes and ridge roads.

Detours and side routes are used to vary scenery, adjust distance, or reach viewpoints, depending on riding experience and available time. Independent travel commonly relies on motorcycle rentals and homestay-style lodging along the route corridor. Provincial proposals to collect visitor fees and overnight fees in the geopark districts have been discussed as applying across the districts most commonly included on the loop itinerary.

== Landscape and attractions ==
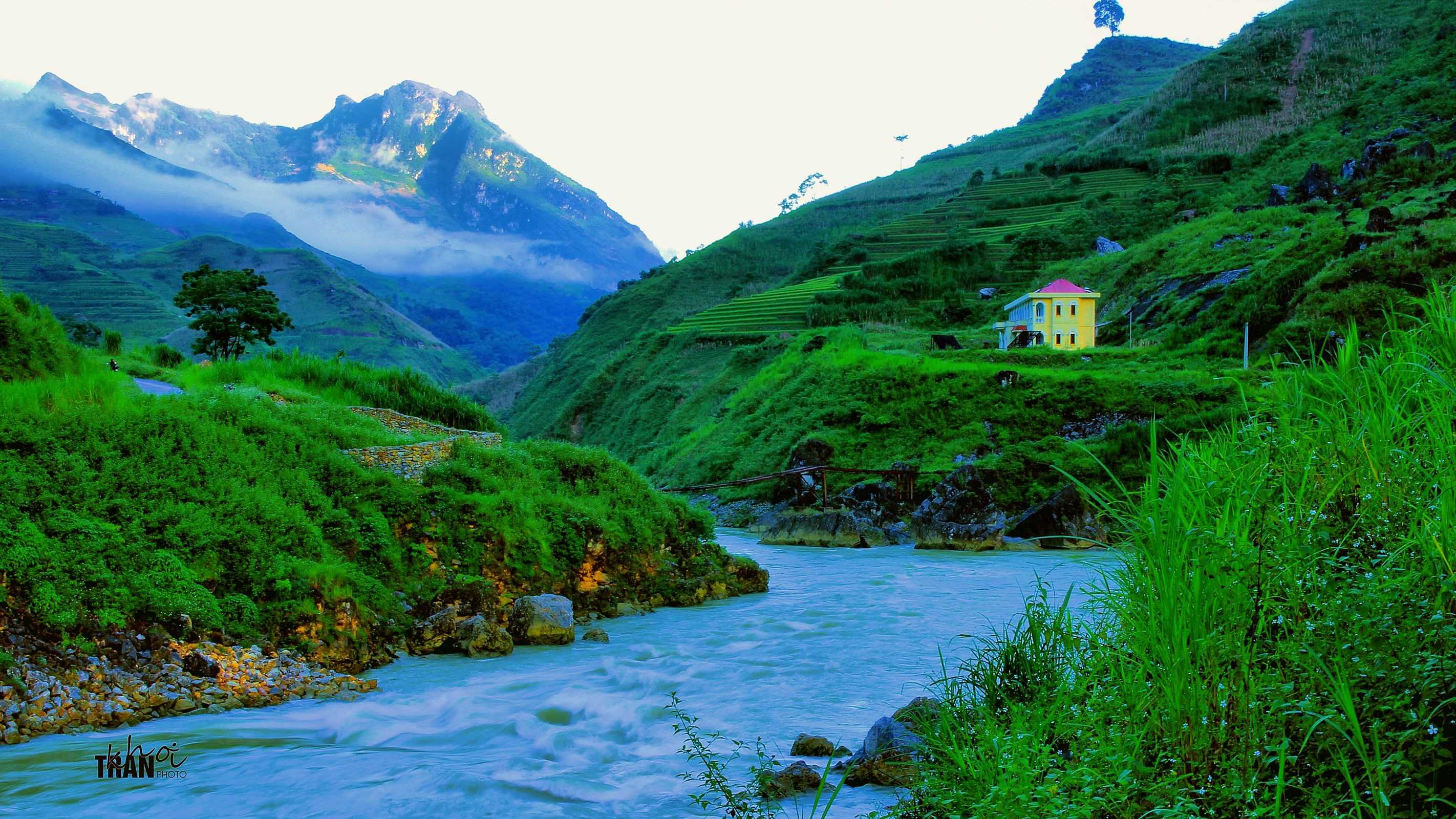
The Nho Que River in the gorge below the plateau road.

Ha Giang Loop, a 370 km (230-mile) road trip that circles through the Dong Van Karst Plateau, takes travelers over mountain passes in the clouds, through ethnic villages, and across majestic rivers before returning to downtown Ha Giang. The loop crosses mountainous terrain and limestone karst landscapes in the highland districts north of Ha Giang City. The route is closely associated with the Dong Van Karst Plateau Geopark, which is listed in the UNESCO Global Geoparks network. Coverage of provincial tourism administration treats the geopark as spanning Dong Van, Yen Minh, Meo Vac, and Quan Ba districts, which align with common loop itineraries.

The road section at Mã Pí Lèng Pass and viewpoints over the Nho Que River are among the best-known stops on the circuit. A geoheritage review of the plateau describes the Đồng Văn karst system as a distinctive geoheritage setting in northern Vietnam and discusses the plateau landscape in relation to geoheritage interpretation and tourism use. Research focused on district geosites likewise frames local geoheritage assessment as a basis for conservation and interpretation in the plateau districts.

== History ==
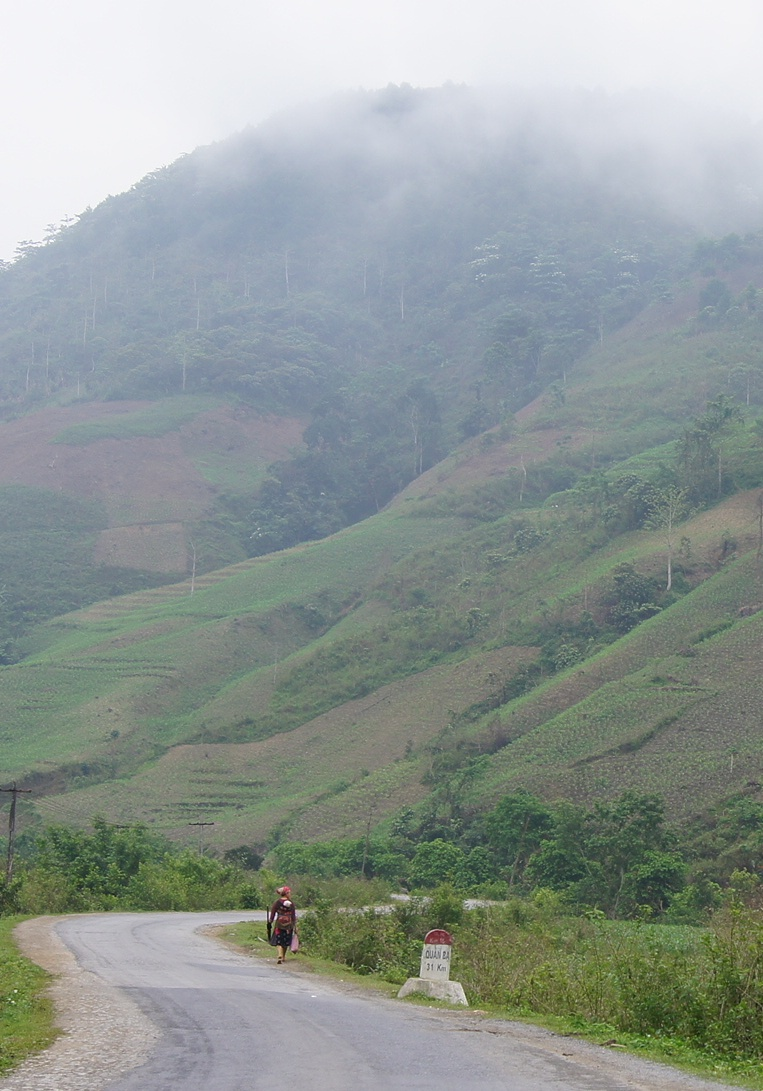
A roadside marker for National Highway 4C, the main alignment across the plateau.

The roads used for the modern loop largely follow the plateau highway widely known as the "Happiness Road" (Con đường Hạnh Phúc), built from 1959 to 1965 to connect Ha Giang City with plateau districts including Dong Van and Meo Vac. The route is commonly described as roughly 184–185 kilometers and running from Ha Giang City through districts such as Quan Ba, Yen Minh, Dong Van, and Meo Vac, with National Highway 4C treated as the modern alignment across the plateau. North Vietnam's leader Ho Chi Minh referred to the project as the "Happiness Road" in 1961.

Accounts of the road-building effort describe travel in the plateau districts before construction as relying largely on footpaths and packhorse tracks, followed by extensive manual work in steep terrain. VietnamPlus coverage describes participation by youth volunteer brigades and local labor mobilized from ethnic minority communities along the route. The road was started in 1959 with participation by volunteers and civilian laborers from 16 ethnic groups—including the Hmong, Tày, Dao, Nùng, Pu Péo, and Lô Lô. Ministry coverage tied to the 2009 national-monument recognition of the Mã Pí Lèng landscape describes the pass worksite as sustaining large-scale manual rock cutting and states that more than 1,000 youth volunteers and local residents were mobilized at the Mã Pí Lèng site, with the pass segment taking nearly two years to complete.

== Tourism and local economy ==
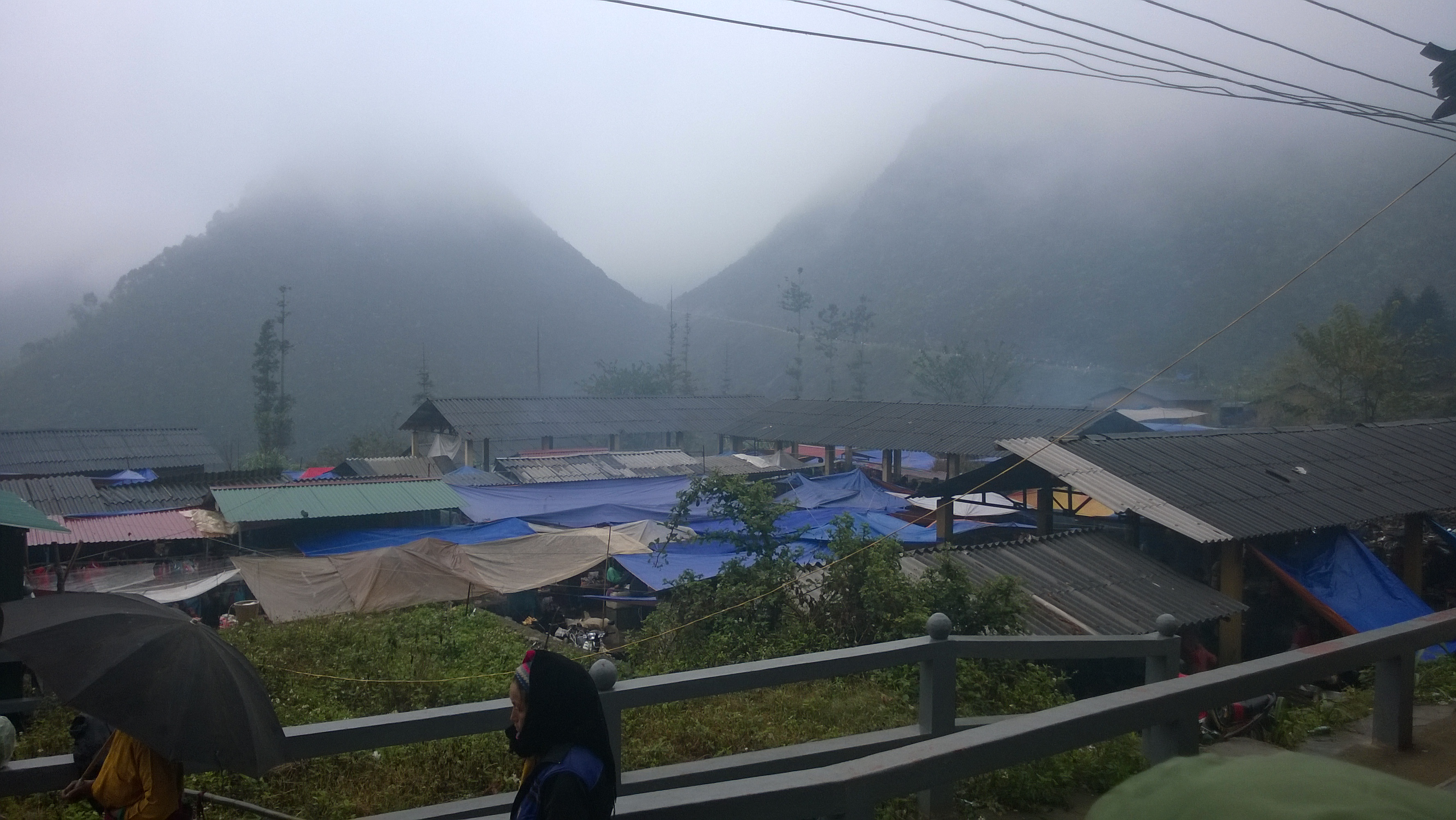
Market stalls in rural Ha Giang Province.

Ha Giang tourism planning has treated growth in visitor arrivals as a provincial economic priority, with VietnamPlus reporting a provincial target of about 3.5 million visitors for 2025 and reporting over 848,000 arrivals in the first quarter of 2025. VnExpress has described the loop corridor as a major draw for independent travelers in the province. Vietnamese-language travel coverage has likewise highlighted motorcycle travel in Ha Giang as a seasonal experience category tied to highland scenery.

Tourism reporting has also emphasized constraints tied to infrastructure, visitor services, and staffing capacity in the province. Proposals to collect fees from tourists for overnight stays within the Dong Van plateau geopark area have been described as a revenue measure intended for infrastructure and conservation-related spending. Discussion of fee collection has been linked to the plateau districts most often used in loop itineraries.

== Guiding and transport services ==
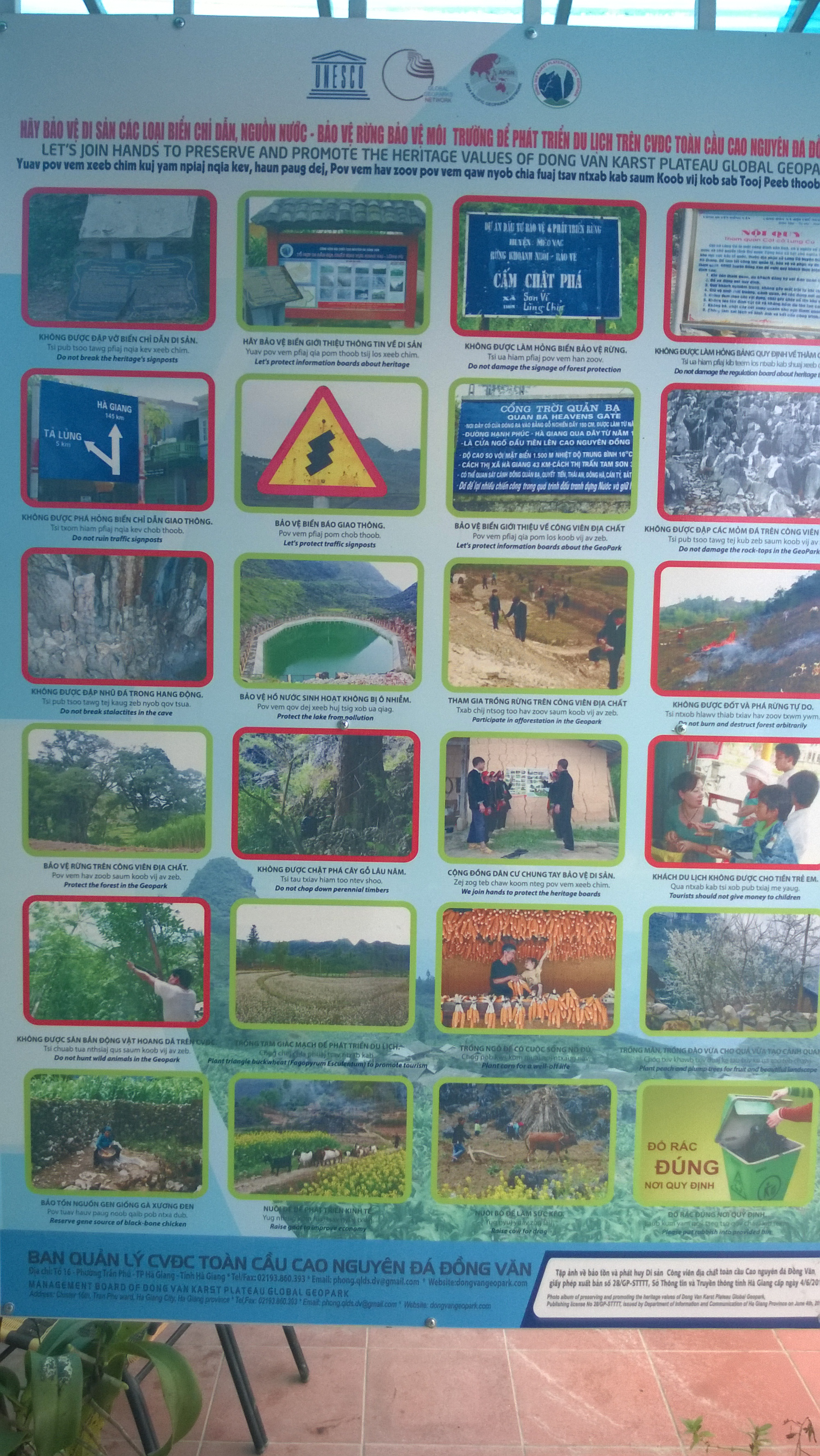
A tourist information board in Ha Giang Province.

Commercial tours for the loop include arrangements in which visitors ride as passengers on motorcycles driven by local riders, marketed as "easy rider" services. The growth of such services are connected to demand from visitors who do not want to operate motorcycles on steep mountain roads themselves. Tour formats range from private guides to group itineraries run by local companies and informal operators.

Reporting on guiding work along the loop has described training and work routines for local riders and guides, including English communication and safety practices used for foreign visitors. Separate provincial tourism coverage has described limits in service quality and staffing, including language constraints for guiding larger groups of international travelers. Guiding and motorcycle transport services have also been linked to livelihood opportunities in highland districts where agriculture remains prominent.

== Safety and regulation ==
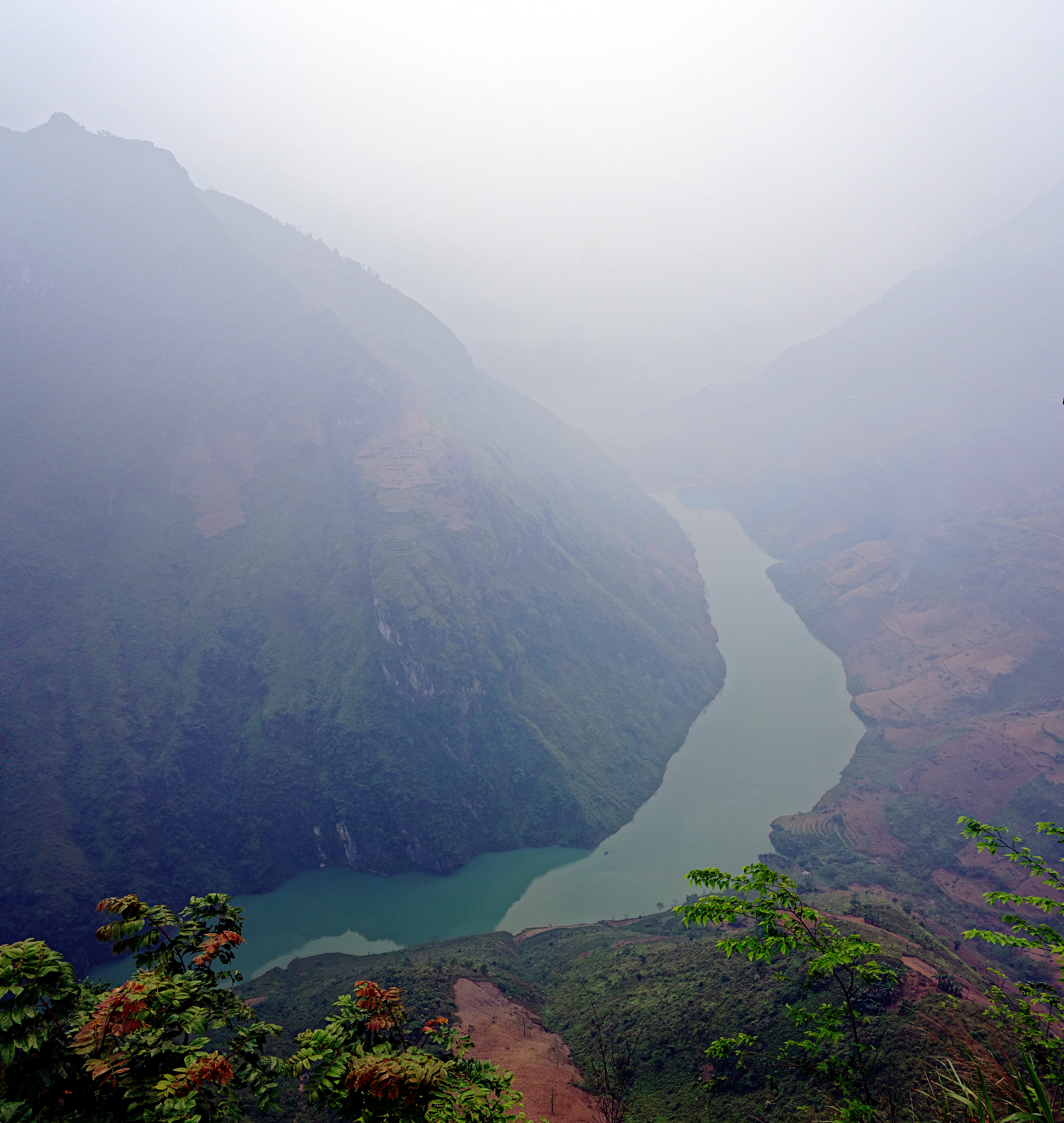
Cliffside terrain at Mã Pí Lèng Pass.

The route includes steep gradients, narrow road sections, and tight curves on mountain passes, increasing risk for inexperienced riders and in poor weather or visibility. The combination of cliffside road segments, sustained descents, and long climbs makes route pacing and braking technique important, especially on the plateau passes. The popularity of the loop has also been linked in reporting to safety concerns tied to independent motorbike rentals and varying rider experience.

The U.S. Department of State advises that a motorcycle license is required to operate a motorcycle or scooter in Vietnam and that international driving permits and U.S. driver's licenses are not valid in Vietnam. The same advisory states that foreigners renting vehicles risk penalties for driving without a Vietnamese license endorsed for the appropriate vehicle class.

== See also ==
- Khau Vai Love Market
