= Dong Van Karst Plateau Geopark =

Geopark in northern Vietnam

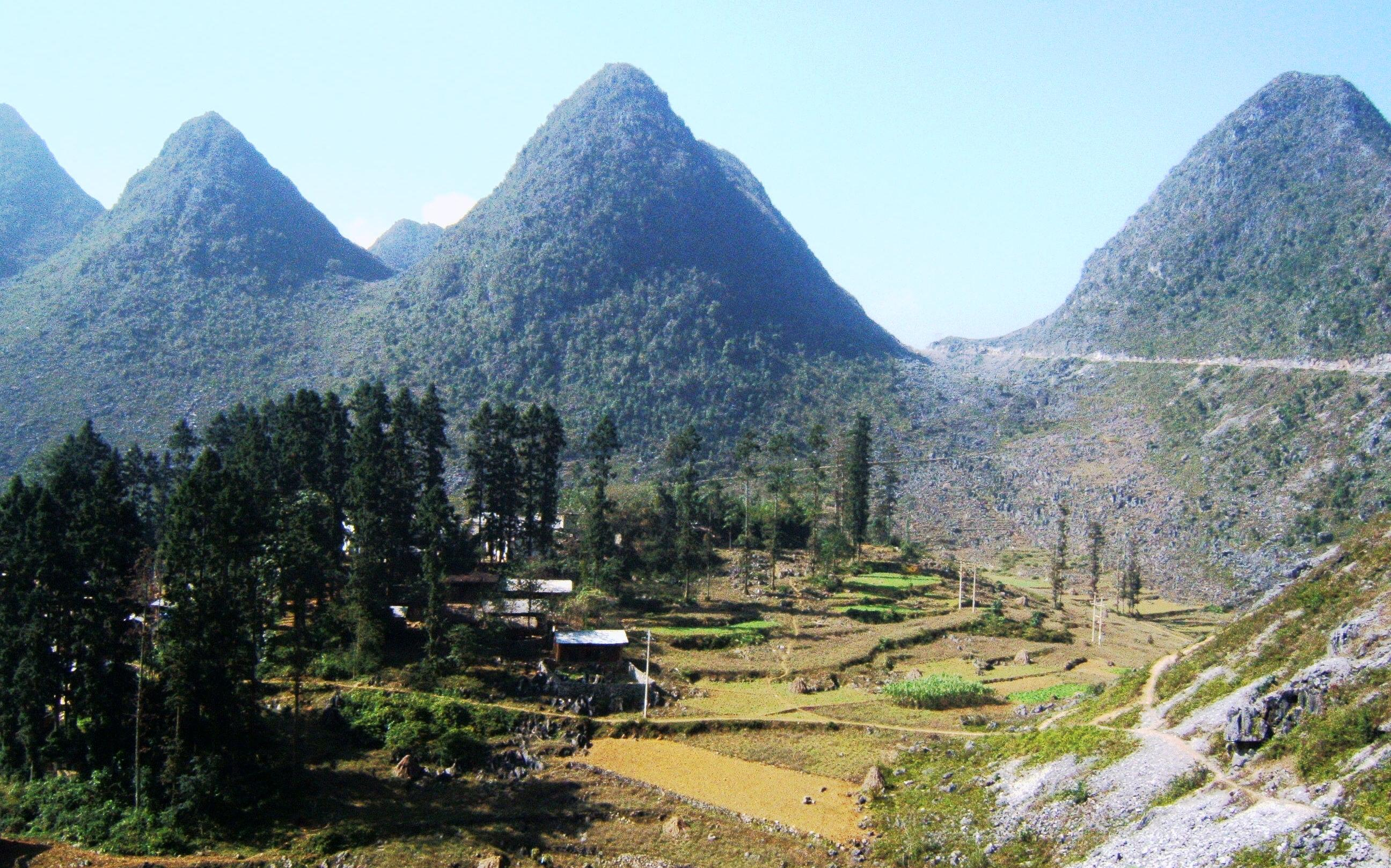
Residence of Hmong Lord on the Turtle Hill in Sà Phìn commune, Hà Giang province, Vietnam.

Dong Van Karst Plateau Geopark (Vietnamese: Cao nguyên đá Đồng Văn) is a geopark in northern Vietnam. It shares border with China in the north. It is a member of the UNESCO Global Geoparks Network and Asia Pacific Geoparks Network, officially since October 3, 2010.

== Nature ==
Dong Van Karst Plateau Geopark is located in Hà Giang Province, the northernmost province in Vietnam. It takes up most of the area of four of the province's districts: Mèo Vạc, Đồng Văn, Yên Minh, and Quản Bạ. The area of the geopark is 2356,8 km^{2}. The average elevation within the geopark is 1400 to 1600 meters above sea level.

About 80% of the area of the geopark is covered by limestone. There are many huge mountains here, the highest one is Mount Mieu Vac (1971 m), meanwhile, there are also many deep canyons, the deepest one is Tu San (about 800 m).

The climate of the geopark varies depending on elevation, but the majority of the park has a temperate climate with two seasons: rainy season and dry season. The annual mean temperature is 24 to 28°C, but it may drop down to 5°C in the winter.

== Geology ==
The geopark is located at an extension foot mount East of the Himalayas.

Geoheritages date from the Cambrian (about 550 million years ago) to the present in seven different stages and include palaeobiology, stratigraphy, geomorphology, tectonics, karst, caves and also important faults. The geology in this geopark reflects important events in Earth history, like of two mass extinction boundaries of Frasnian-Famennian (360 million years ago) and Permian-Triassic (250 million years ago). This includes 3 groups of sedimentary, igneous and metamorphic rocks, as well as stratigraphic, lithostratigraphic and biostratigraphic specificities. Its paleontological diversity shows 19 groups of valuable ancient organisms like ancient fish, ancient flora, brachiopods (eurispirifer tonkinesis), bivalves, trilobites, foraminifera, corals, conodonta, crinoidea and fossilized paths of molluscs.

The Geopark has two natural conservation areas rich in fauna and flora species such as conifers, Asian black bear, Southern serow (a solitary mountain goat) and many species of bird. Moreover, the unusual and mysterious Tonkin snub-nosed monkey is one of the 25 most endangered species of primate in the world. It is only found in Hà Giang province and was believed extinct until its rediscovery in the early 1990s.

The oldest fossil found in the park was found at Lũng Cú peak, and has been dated to 540 million years old.

== Inhabitants ==
17 ethnic minority groups live within the geopark, such as the Hmong, Dao, La Chí, Pu Péo, Lô Lô, Tày, and Nùng. They have a great, varied and valuable cultural heritage.

== Major Geosites ==
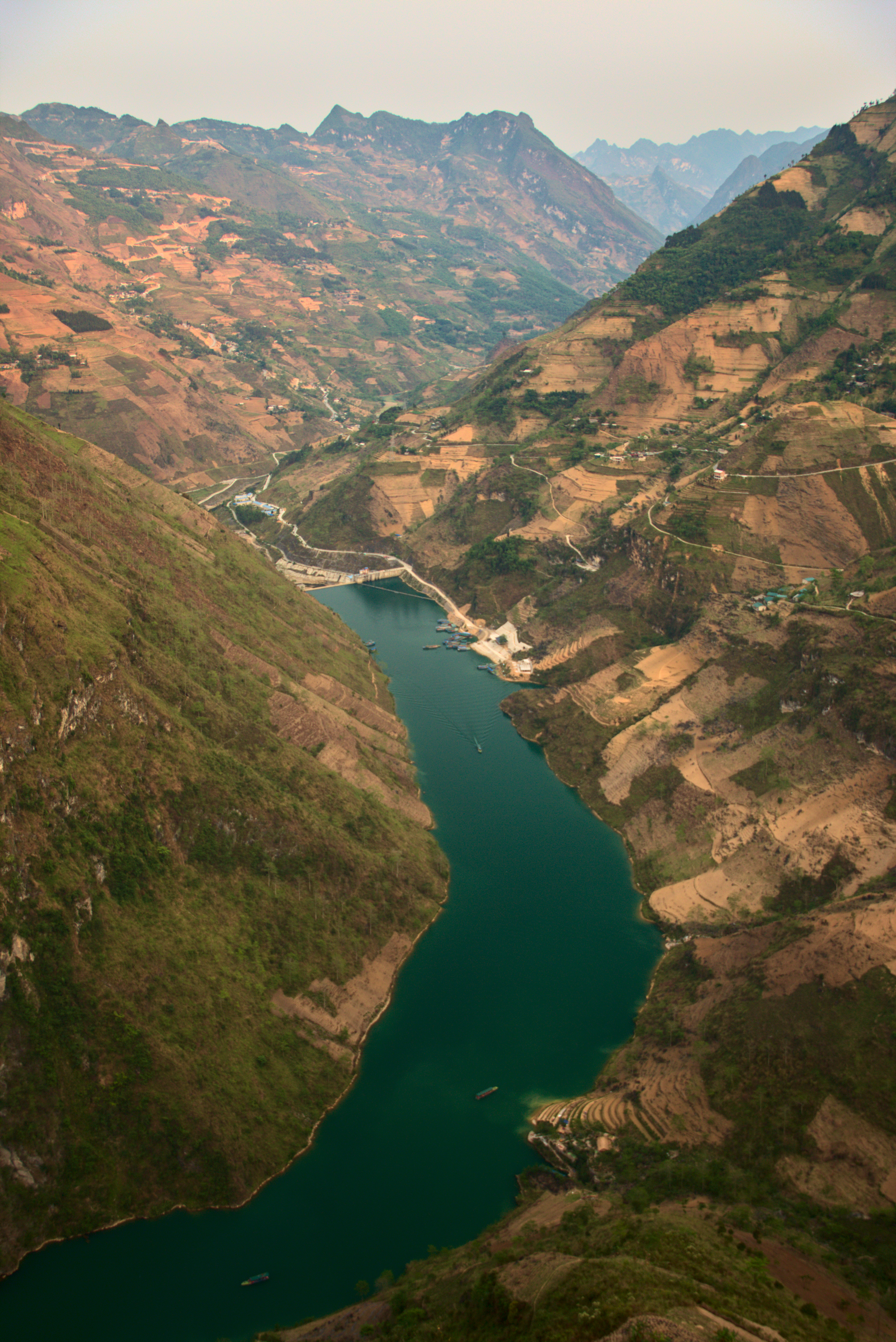
Tu San Canyon, the deepest in Vietnam.

- Mã Pí Lèng Pass (Mèo Vạc district)
- Tu San Canyon (Mèo Vạc district), the deepest canyon in Vietnam. It has a depth of about 800 m, a length of 1.7 km, and cliffs that slope 70° to 90°.
- Lũng Cú Peak (Đồng Văn district)
- Fairy bosom peaks (Quản Bạ district)
