= Mèo Vạc district =

Coordinates: 23.167°N 105.417°E

Mèo Vạc District Huyện Mèo Vạc
- District
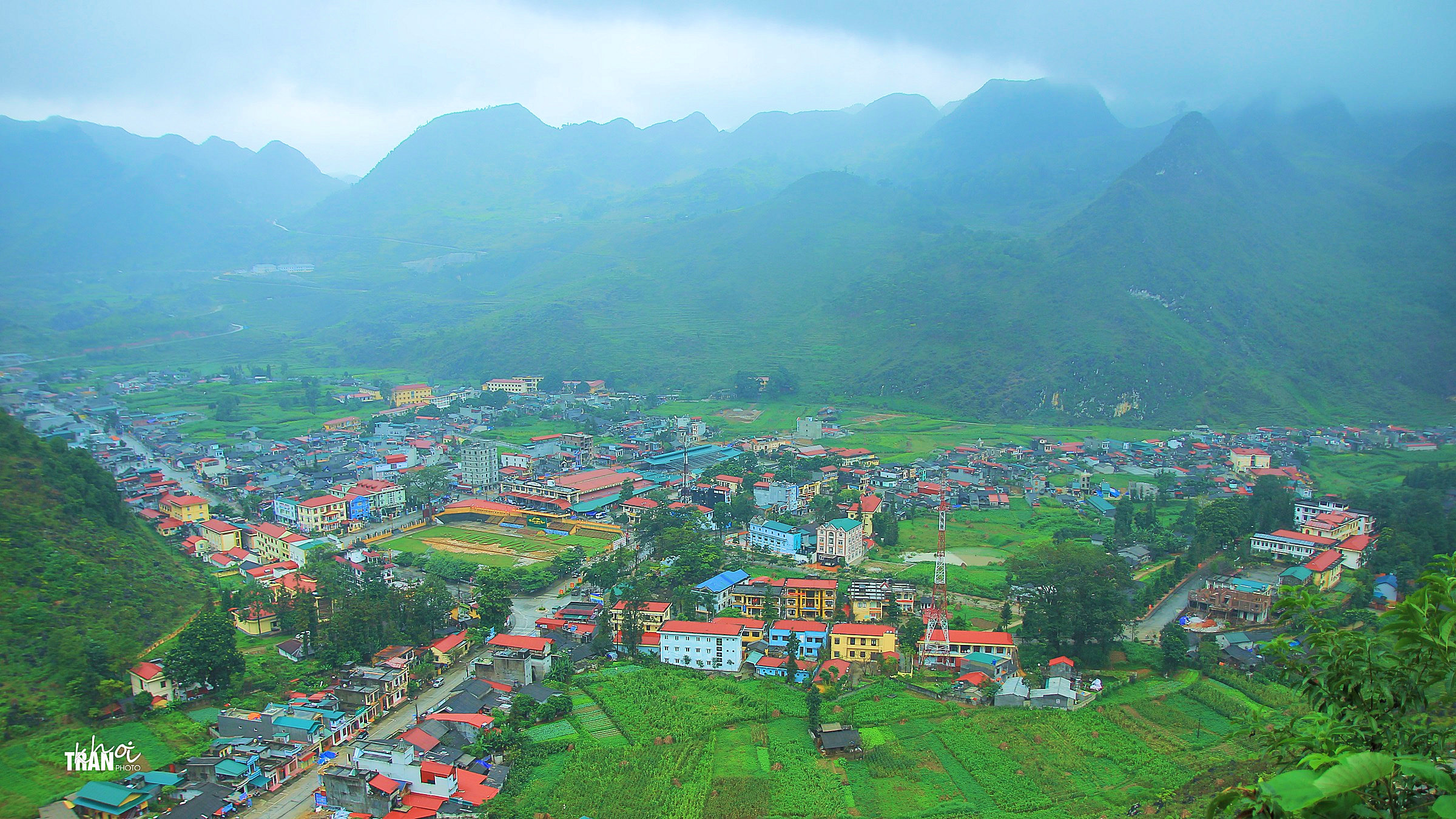

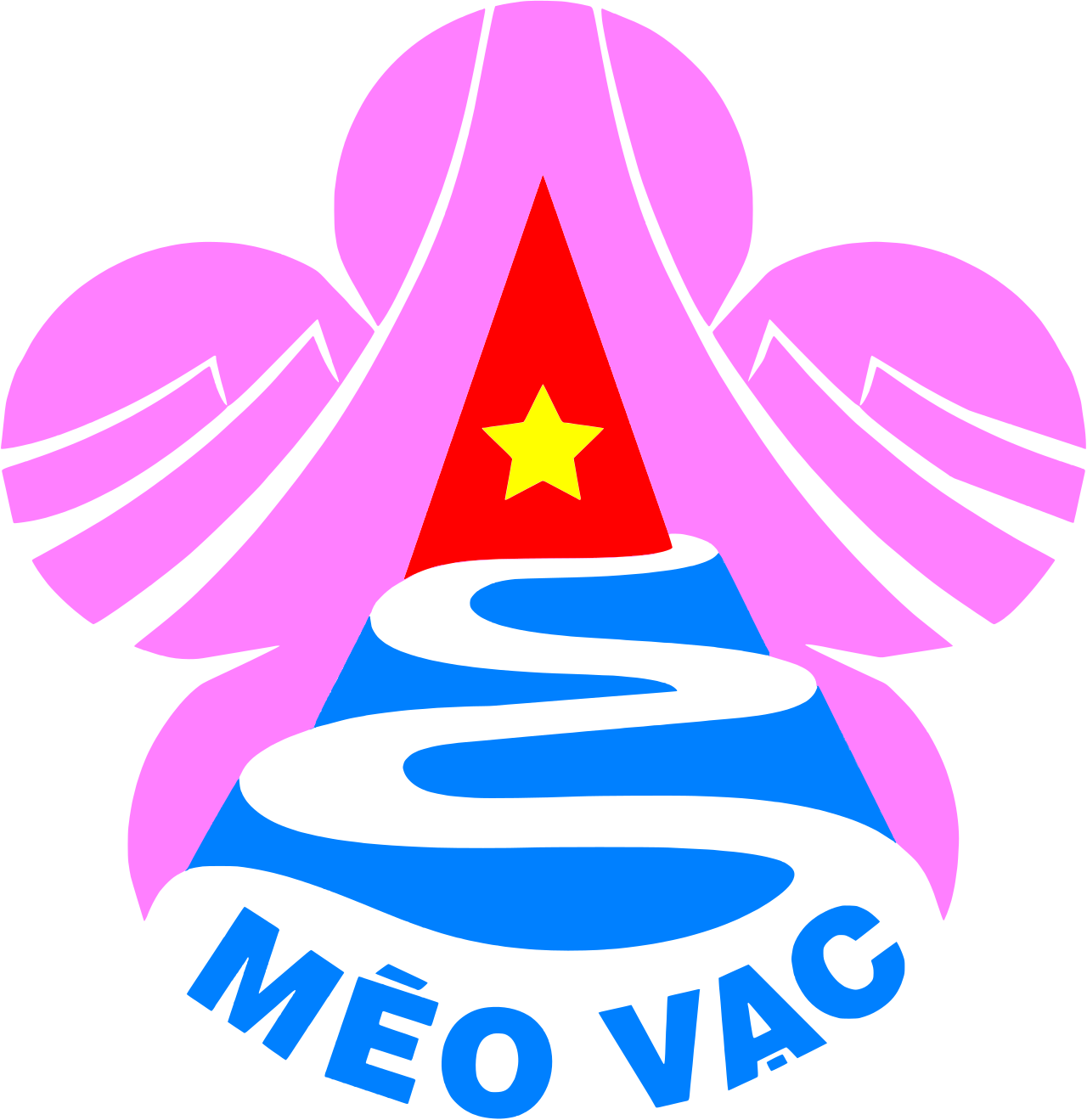
- Seal
- Interactive map of Mèo Vạc District
- Location within Vietnam
- Country: Vietnam
- Province: Hà Giang Province
- Administrative divisions: 1 townlet, 17 communes
- Capital: Mèo Vạc Town

Area
  - Total: 584.73 km^{2} (225.77 sq mi)

Population (2018)
  - Total: 82,000
  - Density: 140/km^{2} (360/sq mi)
- Time zone: UTC+7 (Indochina Time)
- Website: Mèo Vạc District E-Information Portal Website

Mèo Vạc District (Huyện Mèo Vạc) is a former district of Hà Giang Province, Vietnam. It covered an area of 584.73 km^{2} (225.77 sq mi), and had a population of 82,000 as of 2018.

== Geography ==
Mèo Vạc District bordered People's Republic of China's Yunnan Province and Guangxi Zhuang Autonomous Region to the north and east, Cao Bằng Province's Bảo Lâm District to the south, and Yên Minh District and Đồng Văn District to the west.

== History ==
On December 15, 1962, Mèo Vạc District was established by separating 16 communes from Đồng Văn District.

On December 27, 1975, Tuyên Quang Province and Hà Giang Province merged to form Hà Tuyên Province, and Mèo Vạc District was subsequently transferred to Hà Tuyên Province.

On May 14, 1981, two villages of Xín Cái Commune were transferred to the jurisdiction of Thượng Phùng Commune.

On October 21, 1982, three communes of Mèo Vạc District were transferred to Yên Minh District, while three communes of Yên Minh District were transferred to Mèo Vạc District.

On August 12, 1991, Hà Tuyên Province was re-divided into Tuyên Quang Province and Hà Giang Province, and Mèo Vạc District was subsequently transferred to Hà Giang Province.

On August 20, 1999, two villages of Sủng Trà Commune were transferred to Mèo Vạc Commune, and Mèo Vạc Commune was divided into Mèo Vạc Townlet and Tả Lủng Commune.

On August 9, 2005, Niêm Tòng Commune was separated from Niêm Sơn Commune and Khâu Vai Commune.

On June 12, 2025, Tuyên Quang Province and Hà Giang Province merged to form a new Tuyên Quang Province, and Mèo Vạc District was briefly transferred to Tuyên Quang Province. On June 16, the National Assembly of Vietnam abolished district-level administrative divisions, and Mèo Vạc District was abolished. The former district's territory was reorganized as follows, with all new communes directly under Tuyên Quang Province:

- Mèo Vạc Townlet, Tả Lủng Commune, Giàng Chu Phìn Commune, and Pả Vi Commune merged to form Mèo Vạc Commune
- Cán Chủ Phìn Commune, Lũng Pù Commune, and Khâu Vai Commune merged to form a new Khâu Vai Commune
- Niêm Tòng Commune and Niêm Sơn Commune merged to form a new Niêm Sơn Commune
- Nậm Ban Commune and Tát Ngà Commune merged to form a new Tát Ngà Commune
- Lũng Chinh Commune, Sủng Trà Commune, and Sủng Máng Commune merged to form a new Sủng Máng Commune
- Thượng Phùng Commune, Xín Cái Commune, and Sơn Vĩ Commune merged to form a new Sơn Vĩ Commune
- Pải Lủng Commune was incorporated into Đồng Văn Commune

== Administrative divisions ==
Mèo Vạc District covers one township and 17 communes, with its capital located at Mèo Vạc Township.

- Mèo Vạc Township (Thị trấn Mèo Vạc)
- Cán Chu Phìn Commune (Xã Cán Chu Phìn)
- Giàng Chu Phìn Commune (Xã Giàng Chu Phìn)
- Khâu Vai Commune (Xã Khâu Vai)
- Lũng Chinh Commune (Xã Lũng Chinh)
- Lũng Pù Commune (Xã Lũng Pù)
- Nậm Ban Commune (Xã Nậm Ban)
- Niêm Sơn Commune (Xã Niêm Sơn)
- Niêm Tòng Commune (Xã Niêm Tòng)
- Pả Vi Commune (Xã Pả Vi)
- Pải Lủng Commune (Xã Pải Lủng)
- Sơn Vĩ Commune (Xã Sơn Vĩ)
- Sủng Máng Commune (Xã Sủng Máng)
- Sủng Trà Commune (Xã Sủng Trà)
- Tả Lủng Commune (Xã Tả Lủng)
- Tát Ngà Commune (Xã Tát Ngà)
- Thượng Phùng Commune (Xã Thượng Phùng)
- Xín Cái Commune (Xã Xín Cái)
