= Nho Quế River =

River in Vietnam

Nho Quế River Nanli River / Pumei River Sông Nho Quế / Sông Nam Lợi / Sông Phổ Mai
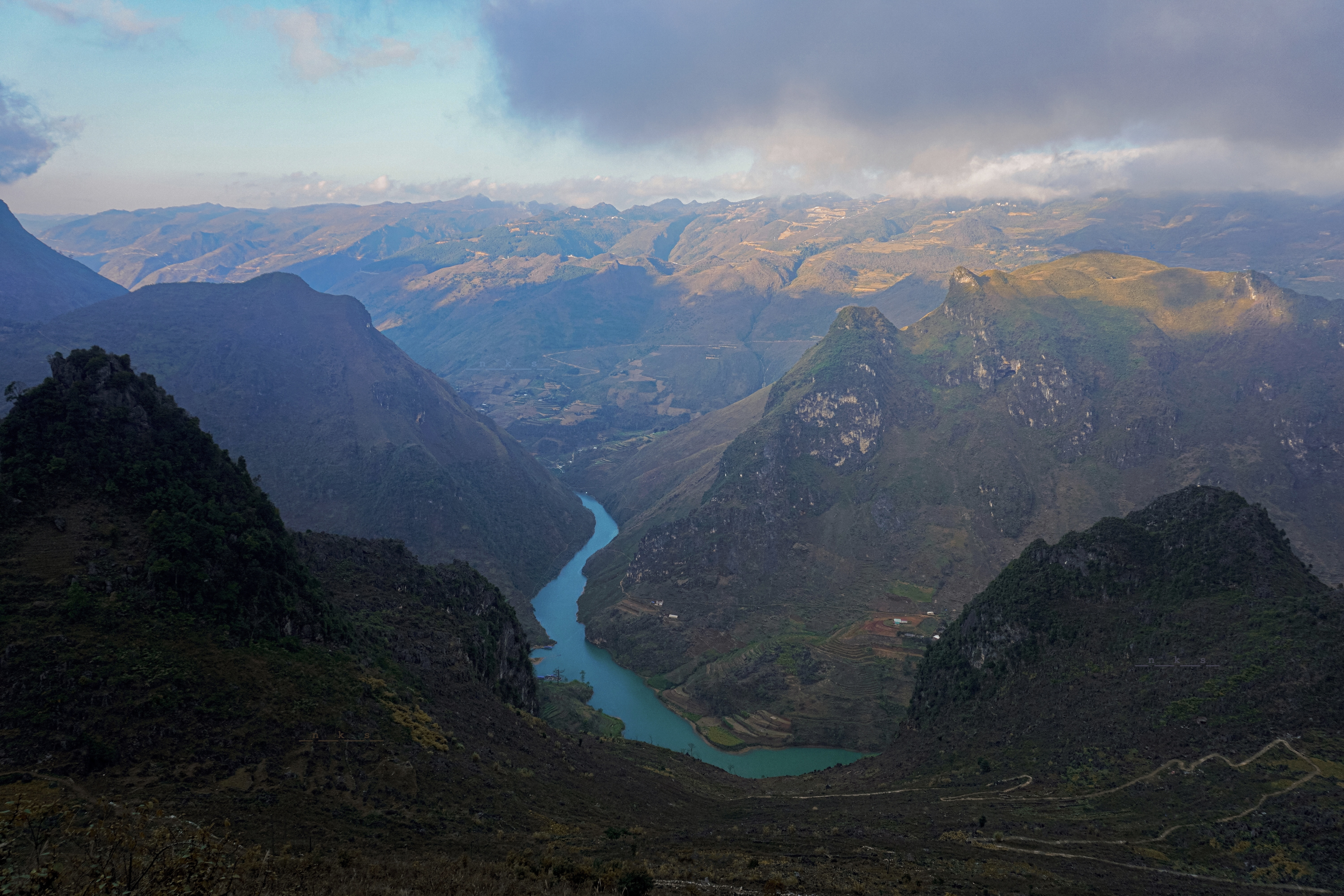

Location
- Countries: China, Vietnam
- Regions: Southeast Yunnan; Northwest Vietnam

Physical characteristics
- Source
  - location: Jiangna Town, Yanshan County, Yunnan, China
  - coordinates: 23°27′29″N 104°36′38″E
  - elevation: 1,500 m (4,900 ft)
- Mouth
  - location: Na Phong, Lý Bôn Commune, Cao Bằng province, Vietnam
  - coordinates: 22°56′45″N 105°32′59″E
- Length: 192 km (119 mi)
- Basin size: 6,052 km^{2} (2,337 sq mi)
- Discharge
  - average: 85 m^{3}/s (3,000 cu ft/s)

Basin features
- Progression: Rnn→ Gâm River→ Red River→ Gulf of Tonkin
- River system: Red River drainage basin
- Tributaries
  - right: Sông Nhiệm

The Nho Quế River (Vietnamese: sông Nho Quế), also known as the Nanli River (Chinese: 南利河; pinyin: Nán lì hé) or Pumei River (Chinese: 普梅河; pinyin: Pǔ méi hé) in China, and historically as the Phổ Mai River (Vietnamese: sông Phổ Mai) or Nam Lợi River (Vietnamese: sông Nam Lợi) in Vietnam, is a tributary of the Gâm River (a major tributary of the Red River system, known as the Panlong River or Lujiang in China). It flows through the southeast of China's Yunnan province and the northwest of Vietnam.

== Course ==
The river originates from Gunniang Mountain (姑娘山) near Jiangna Town, Yanshan County, Wenshan Prefecture, Yunnan Province, China, at an elevation of about 1,500 meters. It flows southwards蜿蜒南流 and near Wengda Village, Panlong Yi Ethnic Township, it goes underground for approximately 3 km as a subterranean river. Resurfacing, it is known as the Baga River (八嘎河) as it passes through Baga Township in Yanshan County. Turning southeast and then east near Sanxing Village in Baga Township, it enters Xichou County, where it is called the Jijie River (鸡街河) along Jijie Township. It then flows along the border of Guangnan County and Malipo County under the name "Dahe" (大河, "Big River"). Turning south, it forms the border between Malipo County and Funing County, and from this point onwards it is consistently called the Nanli River (南利河).

For a 16.4 km stretch along the border of Funing County's Muyang Town and Tianpeng Town, the Nanli River serves as the international boundary between China and Vietnam. It exits China northwest of Tianpeng Town in Funing County.

Upon entering Vietnam in Lũng Cú Commune, Tuyên Quang province, the river is known as the Sông Nho Quế (儒桂河). It flows through the communes of Đồng Văn and Mèo Vạc in Hà Giang province before converging with the Gam River at Nà Phòng in Lý Bôn Commune, Cao Bằng province.

The total length of the river is approximately 192 km. The section within China is 185.7 km long, while the section within Vietnam is about 46 km long. The total drainage basin area is 6,052 km², with 3,716.6 km² (excluding separately exiting tributaries) lying within China and 2,010 km² within Vietnam. The average elevation of the basin is 1,255 m, with an average gradient of 18.7%. The karst landscape along its course features numerous peaks, basins, and underground rivers.

== Hydrology ==
The average annual flow volume is approximately 2.69 km³, corresponding to an average discharge of 85 m³/s at the mouth and a specific discharge of 15.8 L/s/km².

== Tributaries ==
A major right-bank tributary in Vietnam is the Nhiem River (Sông Nhiệm), which joins the Nho Quế near the border of Niêm Sơn Commune (Tuyên Quang), Cốc Pàng Commune, and Lý Bôn Commune (Cao Bằng).

== Hydroelectricity ==
There are several hydroelectric power plants on the Vietnamese section of the Nho Quế River.

=== Nho Quế River Cascade ===
- Nho Quế 3 Hydropower Plant: Capacity 110 MW, annual output 507 GWh. Located in Khâu Vai and Sơn Vĩ communes, Mèo Vạc commune, Tuyên Quang Province. Construction started in 2007, completed June 2012.
- Nho Quế 2 Hydropower Plant: Capacity 48 MW, annual output 225 GWh. Located in Mèo Vạc commune, Tuyên Quang Province. Construction started August 2012, completed August 2016.
- Nho Quế 1 Hydropower Plant 23°14′35.7″N 105°24′54.8″E: Capacity 32 MW, annual output 129 GWh. Located in Sơn Vĩ and Mèo Vạc communes, Tuyên Quang Province. Construction started 2013, completed June 2015.

=== Bảo Lâm Cascade ===
- Bảo Lâm 3 Hydropower Plant 23°00′47″N 105°29′12″E: Capacity 46 MW. Located on the border of Cốc Pàng Commune (Cao Bằng) and Niêm Tòng Commune (Tuyên Quang). Construction period: 2015–2017.
- Thủy điện Bảo Lâm 3A công suất 8 MW, tại xã Cốc Pàng và Lý Bôn, tỉnh Cao Bằng, thời gian thực hiện: 2016 – 2018
- Bảo Lâm 3A Hydropower Plant: Capacity 8 MW. Located in Cốc Pàng and Lý Bôn communes, Cao Bằng Province. Construction period: 2016–2018.

A dam for hydroelectric power is also located in China, approximately 6 km from the border.

== Toponymy ==
The river has various local names along its course due to the diverse ethnic groups inhabiting the region. Sources provide different names for the river in China:

- The Chinese Wikipedia lists the primary name as 南利河 (Nán lì hé, Nanli River), with alternates 普梅河 (Pǔ méi hé, Pumei River) and 八嘎河 (Bā gā hé, Baga River).
- Some maps, including a 1:500,000 scale map ("F-48-B Cao Bằng"), refer to it as the Phổ Mai River (Sông Phổ Mai) or Phổ Mai hà, with its upper reaches called "Quy Mô Đại hà".
- A 1:50,000 scale map ("F-48-19-B Đồng Văn") labels the section within China as "Nan Li He" and the border section with the parallel names "Pu Mei He" and "Ru Gui He".
- Google Maps labels the upper reaches as "Dahe River" and the section near and on the border as "Nanli River".

In Vietnam, the official name is Sông Nho Quế, but historical names like Sông Phổ Mai (from the Chinese Pumei) and Sông Nam Lợi (from the Chinese Nanli) are also known.

== Tourism ==
Popular activities around the Nho Quế River include boating through Tu Sản Canyon, kayaking, motorbike along the surrounding mountain roads, and overnight camping by the river. The area is also visited by motorcyclists travelling the Hà Giang Loop, the routes can be steep and challenging.

== See also ==
- Khau Vai Love Market
