= Hà Nam =

Hà Nam Phường Hà Nam
- Ward
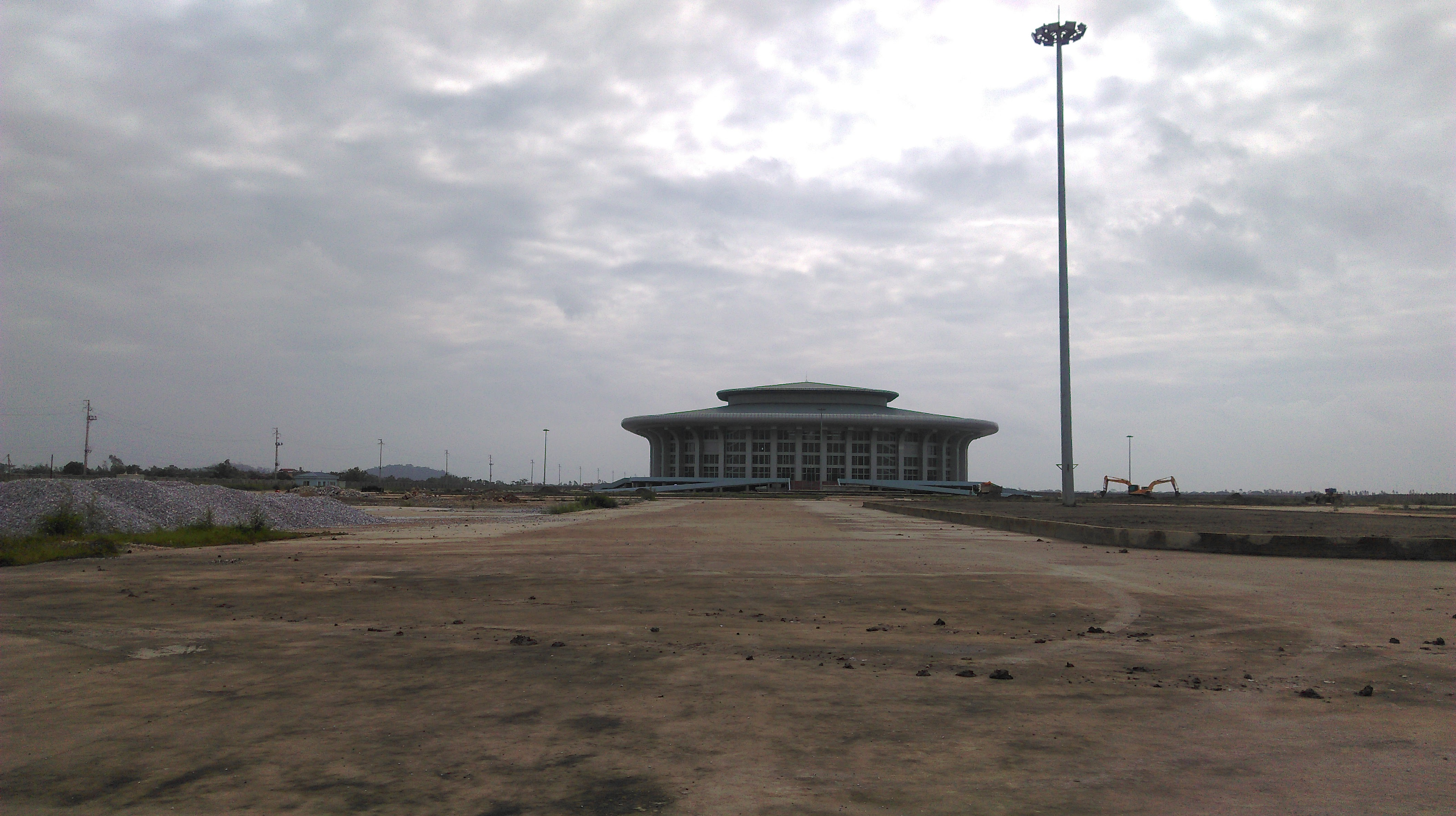
- Ha Nam Sports Arena
- Interactive map of Hà Nam
- Country: Vietnam
- Regions: Red River Delta
- Province: Ninh Bình province
- Established: June 16, 2025

Area
  - Total: 29.98 km^{2} (11.58 sq mi)

Population (2025)
  - Total: 33,343
  - Density: 1,112/km^{2} (2,881/sq mi)
- Time zone: UTC+07:00 (Indochina Time)

Hà Nam is a ward (phường) of Ninh Bình province, Vietnam.

== Geography ==
Hà Nam Ward located in northern Ninh Bình Province, and adjacent to:

- Duy Hà ward to the north
- Phủ Lý ward and Liêm Tuyền ward to the south
- Kim Thanh ward, Kim Bảng ward and Phù Vân ward to the west
- Tiên Sơn ward to the east.

== History ==
On June 12, 2025, the National Assembly of Vietnam issued Resolution No. 202/2025/QH15 on the arrangement of provincial-level administrative units (effective from June 12, 2025). Accordingly, the entire land area and population of Hà Nam province, Nam Định province and Ninh Bình province were merged to form a new province named Ninh Bình province.

On June 16, 2025, the Standing Committee of the National Assembly of Vietnam issued Resolution No. 1674/NQ-UBTVQH15 on the arrangement of commune-level administrative units of Ninh Bình Province in 2025 (effective from June 16, 2025). Accordingly, the entire land area and population of Lam Hạ ward, Tân Hiệp ward, part of Quang Trung ward (Phủ Lý City), and the remaining part of Hoàng Đông ward, Tiên Nội ward, Tiên Ngoại commune after being arranged (Duy Tiên Town) were merged to form a new ward named Hà Nam.
