= Phù Vân =

Ward in Red River Delta, Vietnam

Phù Vân Phường Phù Vân
- Ward
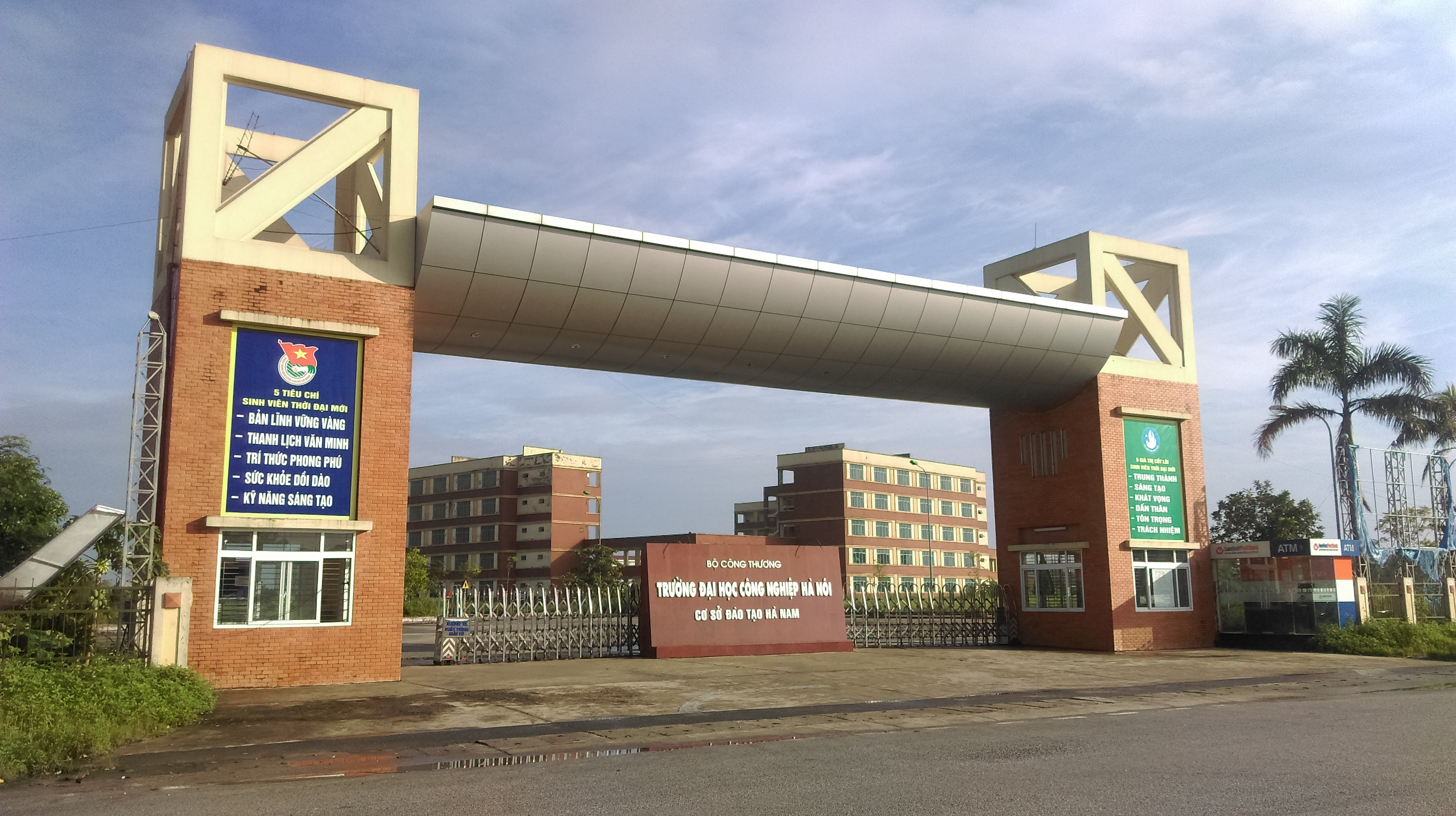
- Hanoi University of Industry – Campus 3
- Interactive map of Phù Vân
- Location in Vietnam
- Country: Vietnam
- Regions: Red River Delta
- Province: Ninh Bình Province
- Established: June 16, 2025

Area
  - Total: 19.34 km^{2} (7.47 sq mi)

Population (2025)
  - Total: 40,927
  - Density: 2,116/km^{2} (5,481/sq mi)
- Time zone: UTC+07:00 (Indochina Time)

Phù Vân is a ward (phường) of Ninh Bình Province, Vietnam.

== Geography ==
Phù Vân Ward located in northern Ninh Bình Province, and adjacent to:

- Kim Bảng Ward to the north
- Châu Sơn Ward to the south
- Lý Thường Kiệt Ward to the west
- Hà Nam Ward and Phủ Lý Ward to the east.

== History ==
On June 12, 2025, the National Assembly of Vietnam issued Resolution No. 202/2025/QH15 on the arrangement of provincial-level administrative units (effective from June 12, 2025). Accordingly, the entire land area and population of Hà Nam Province, Nam Định Province and Ninh Bình Province were merged to form a new province named Ninh Bình Province.

On June 16, 2025, the Standing Committee of the National Assembly of Vietnam issued Resolution No. 1674/NQ-UBTVQH15 on the arrangement of commune-level administrative units of Ninh Bình Province in 2025 (effective from June 16, 2025). Accordingly, the entire land area and population of Lê Hồng Phong Ward, Kim Bình Commune and Phù Vân Commune were merged to form a new ward named Phù Vân Ward.
