= Lý Thường Kiệt (ward) =

Ward in Ninh Binh province, Vietnam

Lý Thường Kiệt Phường Lý Thường Kiệt
- Ward
- Interactive map of Lý Thường Kiệt
- Country: Vietnam
- Regions: Red River Delta
- Province: Ninh Bình Province
- Established: June 16, 2025

Area
  - Total: 53.66 km^{2} (20.72 sq mi)

Population (2025)
  - Total: 22,958
  - Density: 427.8/km^{2} (1,108/sq mi)
- Time zone: UTC+07:00 (Indochina Time)

Lý Thường Kiệt is a ward (phường) of Ninh Bình Province, Vietnam.

== Geography ==
Lý Thường Kiệt Ward located in northern Ninh Bình Province, and adjacent to:

- Kim Bảng Ward to the north
- Tân Thanh Commune and Phú Thọ Province to the south
- Tam Chúc Ward to the northwest
- Phù Vân Ward and Châu Sơn Ward to the east.

== History ==
On June 12, 2025, the National Assembly of Vietnam issued Resolution No. 202/2025/QH15 on the arrangement of provincial-level administrative units (effective from June 12, 2025). Accordingly, the entire land area and population of Hà Nam Province, Nam Định Province and Ninh Bình Province were merged to form a new province named Ninh Bình Province.

On June 16, 2025, the Standing Committee of the National Assembly of Vietnam issued Resolution No. 1674/NQ-UBTVQH15 on the arrangement of commune-level administrative units of Ninh Bình Province in 2025 (effective from June 16, 2025). Accordingly, the entire land area and population of Liên Sơn Commune, Thanh Sơn Commune and Thi Sơn Ward (Kim Bảng Town) were merged to form a new ward named Lý Thường Kiệt Ward.
