= Lê Hồ =

Lê Hồ Phường Lê Hồ
- Ward
- Interactive map of Lê Hồ
- Country: Vietnam
- Regions: Red River Delta
- Province: Ninh Bình Province
- Established: June 16, 2025

Area
  - Total: 22.27 km^{2} (8.60 sq mi)

Population (2025)
  - Total: 32,373
  - Density: 1,454/km^{2} (3,765/sq mi)
- Time zone: UTC+07:00 (Indochina Time)

Lê Hồ is a ward (phường) of Ninh Bình Province, Vietnam.

== Geography ==
Lê Hồ Ward located in northern Ninh Bình Province, and adjacent to:

- Hanoi City to the north
- Kim Bảng Ward to the south
- Nguyễn Úy Ward and Duy Hà Ward to the west
- Kim Thanh Ward to the east.

== History ==
On June 12, 2025, the National Assembly of Vietnam issued Resolution No. 202/2025/QH15 on the arrangement of provincial-level administrative units (effective from June 12, 2025). Accordingly, the entire land area and population of Hà Nam Province, Nam Định Province and Ninh Bình Province were merged to form a new province named Ninh Bình Province.

On June 16, 2025, the Standing Committee of the National Assembly of Vietnam issued Resolution No. 1674/NQ-UBTVQH15 on the arrangement of commune-level administrative units of Ninh Bình Province in 2025 (effective from June 16, 2025). Accordingly, the entire land area and population of Đại Cương, Đồng Hóa and Lê Hồ Wards were merged to form a new ward named Lê Hồ Ward.
