= Đồng Văn, Ninh Bình =

Đồng Văn Phường Đồng Văn
- Ward
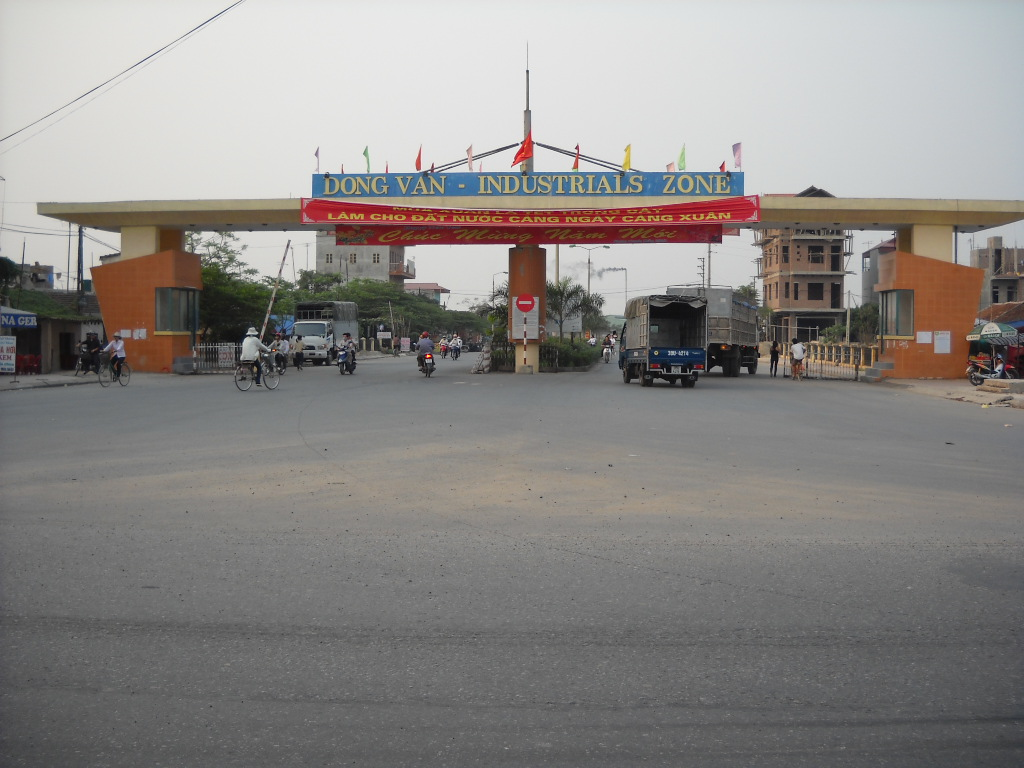
- Đồng Văn I Industrial Park
- Interactive map of Đồng Văn
- Location in Vietnam
- Country: Vietnam
- Regions: Red River Delta
- Province: Ninh Bình Province
- Established: June 16, 2025

Area
  - Total: 18.88 km^{2} (7.29 sq mi)

Population (2025)
  - Total: 34,484
  - Density: 1,826/km^{2} (4,731/sq mi)
- Time zone: UTC+07:00 (Indochina Time)

Đồng Văn is a ward (phường) of Ninh Bình Province, Vietnam.

== Geography ==
Đồng Văn Ward located in northern Ninh Bình Province, and adjacent to:

- Hanoi City to the north
- Tiên Sơn Ward and Duy Tiên Ward to the south
- Duy Hà Ward to the west
- Duy Tân Ward to the east.

== History ==
On June 12, 2025, the National Assembly of Vietnam issued Resolution No. 202/2025/QH15 on the arrangement of provincial-level administrative units (effective from June 12, 2025). Accordingly, the entire land area and population of Hà Nam Province, Nam Định Province and Ninh Bình Province were merged to form a new province named Ninh Bình Province.

On June 16, 2025, the Standing Committee of the National Assembly of Vietnam issued Resolution No. 1674/NQ-UBTVQH15 on the arrangement of commune-level administrative units of Ninh Bình Province in 2025 (effective from June 16, 2025). Accordingly, the entire land area and population of Bạch Thượng, Yên Bắc, Đồng Văn Wards were merged to form a new ward named Đồng Văn Ward.
