= Duy Hà =

Duy Hà Phường Duy Hà
- Ward
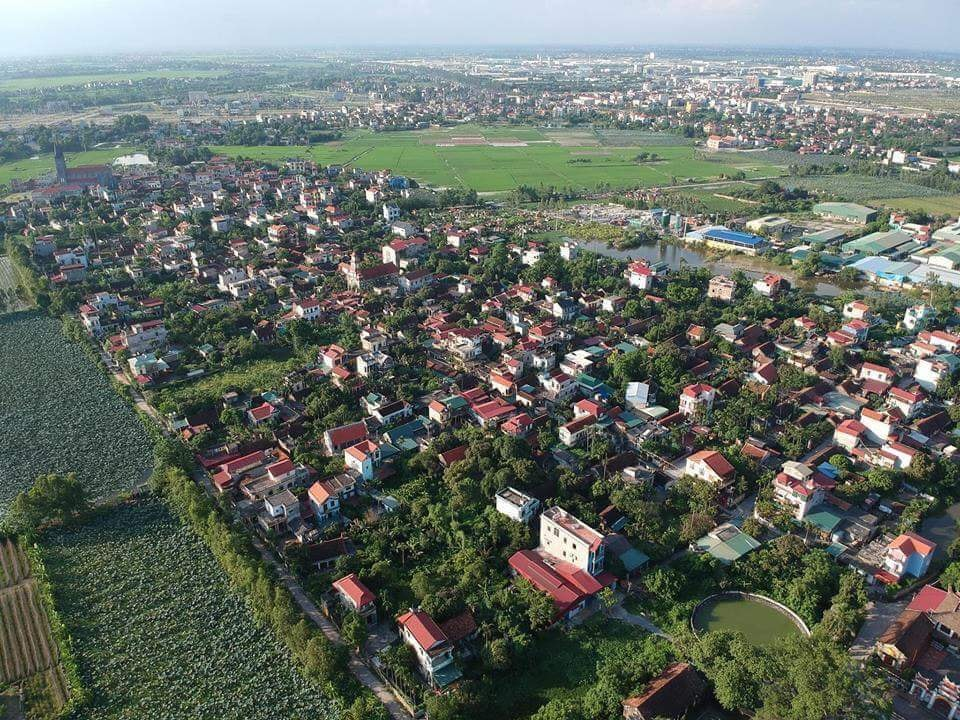
- View of Duy Hà Ward
- Interactive map of Duy Hà
- Country: Vietnam
- Regions: Red River Delta
- Province: Ninh Bình Province
- Established: June 16, 2025

Area
  - Total: 15.46 km^{2} (5.97 sq mi)

Population (2025)
  - Total: 24,310
  - Density: 1,572/km^{2} (4,073/sq mi)
- Time zone: UTC+07:00 (Indochina Time)

Duy Hà is a ward (phường) of Ninh Bình Province, Vietnam.

== Geography ==
Duy Hà Ward located in northern Ninh Bình Province, and adjacent to:

- Hanoi City to the north
- Tiên Sơn Ward and Hà Nam Ward to the south
- Lê Hồ Ward and Kim Thanh Ward to the west
- Đồng Văn Ward to the east.

== History ==
On June 12, 2025, the National Assembly of Vietnam issued Resolution No. 202/2025/QH15 on the arrangement of provincial-level administrative units (effective from June 12, 2025). Accordingly, the entire land area and population of Hà Nam Province, Nam Định Province and Ninh Bình Province were merged to form a new province named Ninh Bình Province.

On June 16, 2025, the Standing Committee of the National Assembly of Vietnam issued Resolution No. 1674/NQ-UBTVQH15 on the arrangement of commune-level administrative units of Ninh Bình Province in 2025 (effective from June 16, 2025). Accordingly, the entire land area and population of Duy Minh Ward, Duy Hải Ward and part of Hoàng Đông Ward were merged to form a new ward named Duy Hà Ward.
