= Đồng Văn =

Đồng Văn may refer to several places in Vietnam:

- Đồng Văn, Ninh Bình, a ward of Ninh Bình Province
- Đồng Văn, Tuyên Quang, a rural commune of Tuyên Quang Province
- Đồng Văn District, a former rural district of Hà Giang Province
- Dong Van Karst Plateau Geopark located in Tuyên Quang
