= Liêm Tuyền =

Ward in Ninh Binh province, Vietnam

Liêm Tuyền Phường Liêm Tuyền
- Ward
- Bạch Mai Hospital's Ninh Bình Branch
- Interactive map of Liêm Tuyền
- Country: Vietnam
- Regions: Red River Delta
- Province: Ninh Bình Province
- Established: June 16, 2025

Area
  - Total: 21.44 km^{2} (8.28 sq mi)

Population (2025)
  - Total: 27,781
  - Density: 1,296/km^{2} (3,356/sq mi)
- Time zone: UTC+07:00 (Indochina Time)

Liêm Tuyền is a ward (phường) of Ninh Bình Province, Vietnam.

== Geography ==
Liêm Tuyền Ward located in northern Ninh Bình Province, and adjacent to:

- Hà Nam Ward and Tiên Sơn Ward to the north
- Liêm Hà Commune and Bình Mỹ Commune to the south
- Phủ Lý Ward to the west
- Bình Lục Commune to the east.

== History ==
On June 12, 2025, the National Assembly of Vietnam issued Resolution No. 202/2025/QH15 on the arrangement of provincial-level administrative units (effective from June 12, 2025). Accordingly, the entire land area and population of Hà Nam Province, Nam Định Province and Ninh Bình Province were merged to form a new province named Ninh Bình Province.

On June 16, 2025, the Standing Committee of the National Assembly of Vietnam issued Resolution No. 1674/NQ-UBTVQH15 on the arrangement of commune-level administrative units of Ninh Bình Province in 2025 (effective from June 16, 2025). Accordingly, the entire land area and population of Tân Liêm Ward, Đinh Xá Commune and Trịnh Xá Commune were merged to form a new ward named Liêm Tuyền Ward.
