= Đọi Sơn Pagoda =

Pagoda in Duy Tiên District, Vietnam

Coordinates: 20.58475°N 105.97511°E

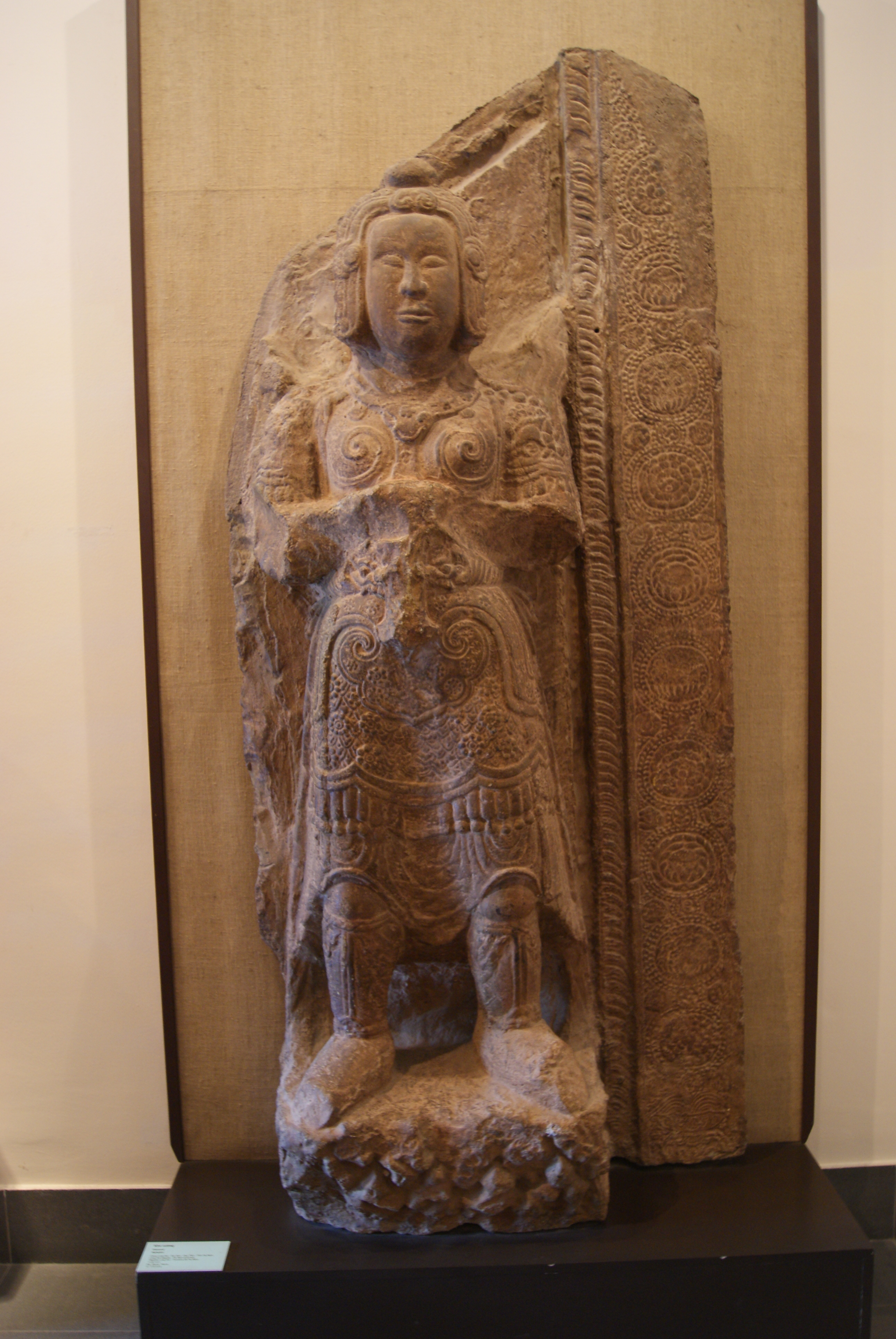
Statue of Vajrapāṇi, Long Đọi Pagoda, Hà Nam Province (1118–1121), Vietnam National Museum of Fine Arts, Hanoi, Vietnam - 20131030

Đọi Sơn Pagoda (Vietnamese: Chùa Đọi Sơn) is located on the top of Mt. Doi which is a unique mouth in the field of Đọi Sơn village, in Duy Tiên District, Hà Nam province, Vietnam. It was built at the beginning of the 12th century on the order of Emperor Lý Nhân Tông. The architecture consists of many houses for worshiping Buddha, for monks, nuns, novices, and for kitchen. The most remarkable is the tower named Sùng Thiện Diên Linh.

In the 15th century, the original pagoda including the tower were damaged by Ming dynasty invaders after having been existed for more than 300 years. The pagoda was terribly destroyed, and the tower was completely demolished until 1591, the pagoda was renovated by the local people. In the middle of the 19th century, it was restored one more. At the pagoda, there are a lot of remains which have been preserved since the period of the Lý dynasty. The most valuable thing is the stele sculptured in 1121, with a height of 2.88 m and a width of 1.40 m. The contents on the stele says about the establishing and guarding our country, about the people's life, the economy, culture, science, technology, 800 years ago. Some other remains can be seen here such as nine rock statues of Kim Cuong, the guardians for Buddha, the statues of divine birds with human head and bird trunk, put on the timbers, ornamental bricks with the picture of dancing girls (also used for the decoration of the tower).

Đọi Sơn is an aged pagoda. It is one of the typical architectural works in the 12th century. The pagoda is also a famous sight in Hà Nam Province for its beauty.
