= Phố Bảng =

Phố Bảng Xã Phố Bảng
- Commune
- Phố Bảng commune
- Location within Vietnam
- Coordinates: 23°15′23″N 105°11′04″E
- Country: Vietnam
- Region: Northeast
- Province: Tuyên Quang
- Time zone: UTC+7 (UTC + 7)

Phố Bảng is a commune (xã) of Tuyên Quang Province, Vietnam.
