= Duy Tân (ward) =

- Ward
- Country: Vietnam
- Province: Ninh Bình

Area
  - Total: 4.95 sq mi (12.81 km^{2})

Population
  - Total: 17,219
  - Density: 3,480/sq mi (1,344/km^{2})
- Time zone: UTC+07:00 (Indochina Time)

Duy Tân is a ward (phường) of Ninh Bình province, Vietnam.
