= Đồng Văn, Tuyên Quang =

Đồng Văn Xã Đồng Văn
- Commune
- Đồng Văn commune
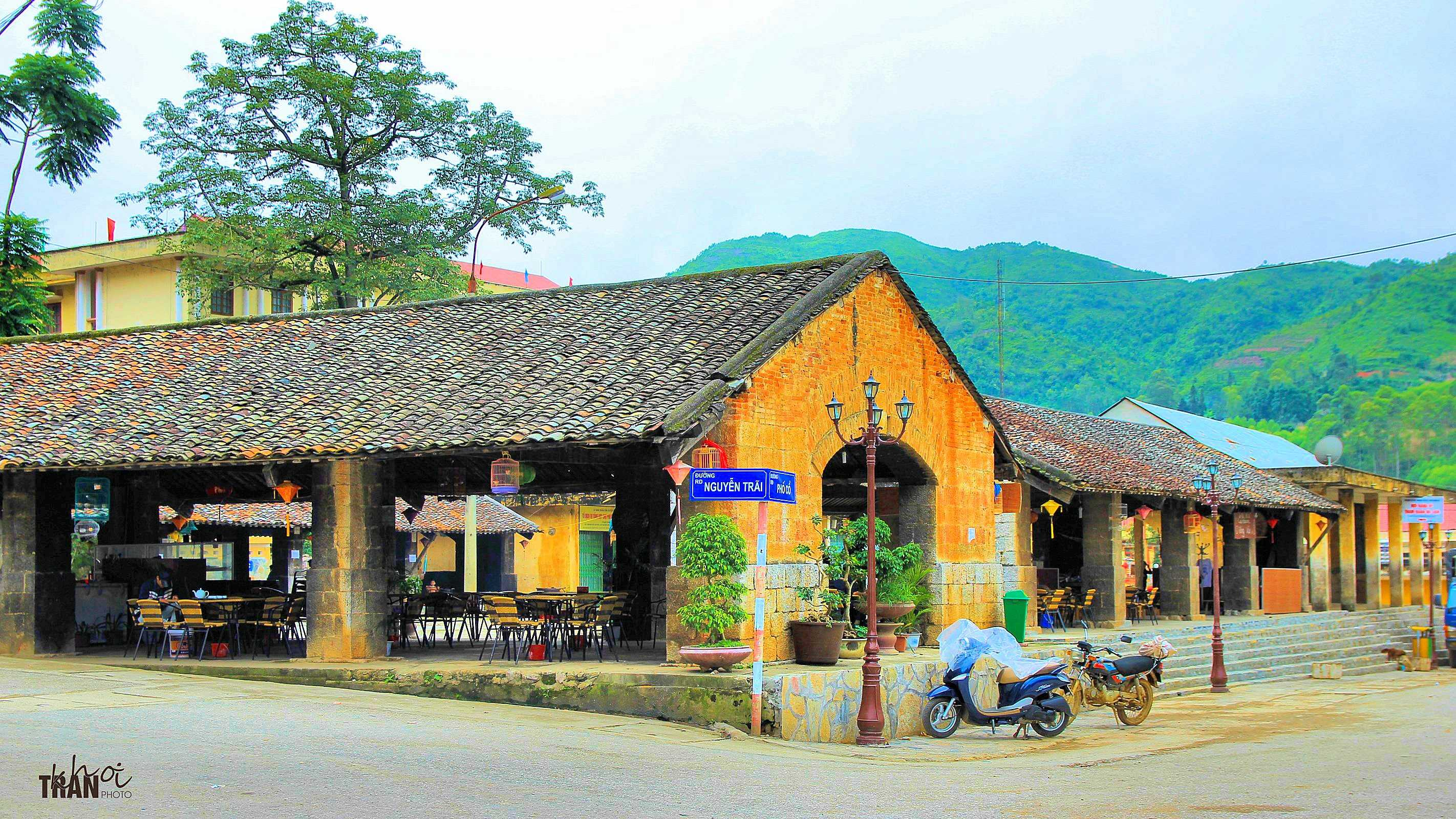

- Location within Vietnam
- Coordinates: 23°16′41″N 105°21′43″E
- Country: Vietnam
- Region: Northeast
- Province: Tuyên Quang
- Time zone: UTC+7 (UTC + 7)

Đồng Văn is a Commune (xã) in Tuyên Quang Province, Vietnam.

== Geography ==
Đồng Văn township is located in the center of Đồng Văn District and has the following geographical boundaries:

- To the east, it borders Mèo Vạc District
- To the west, it borders Thài Phìn Tủng commune
- To the south, it borders Mèo Vạc District and the communes of Thài Phìn Tủng, Tả Phìn, and Tả Lủng
- To the north, it borders China and Má Lé commune.

Đồng Văn township has an area of 27.65 km² and a population of 7,912 people in 2019, giving it a population density of 286 people/km².
