= Phủ Lý =

- Ward
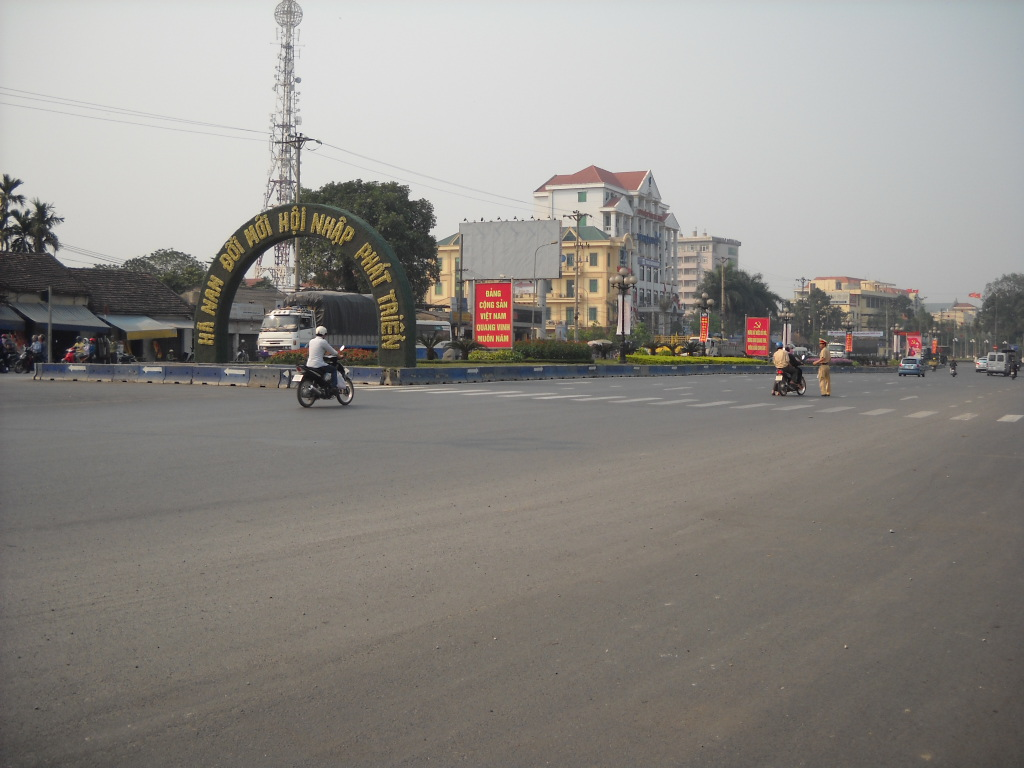
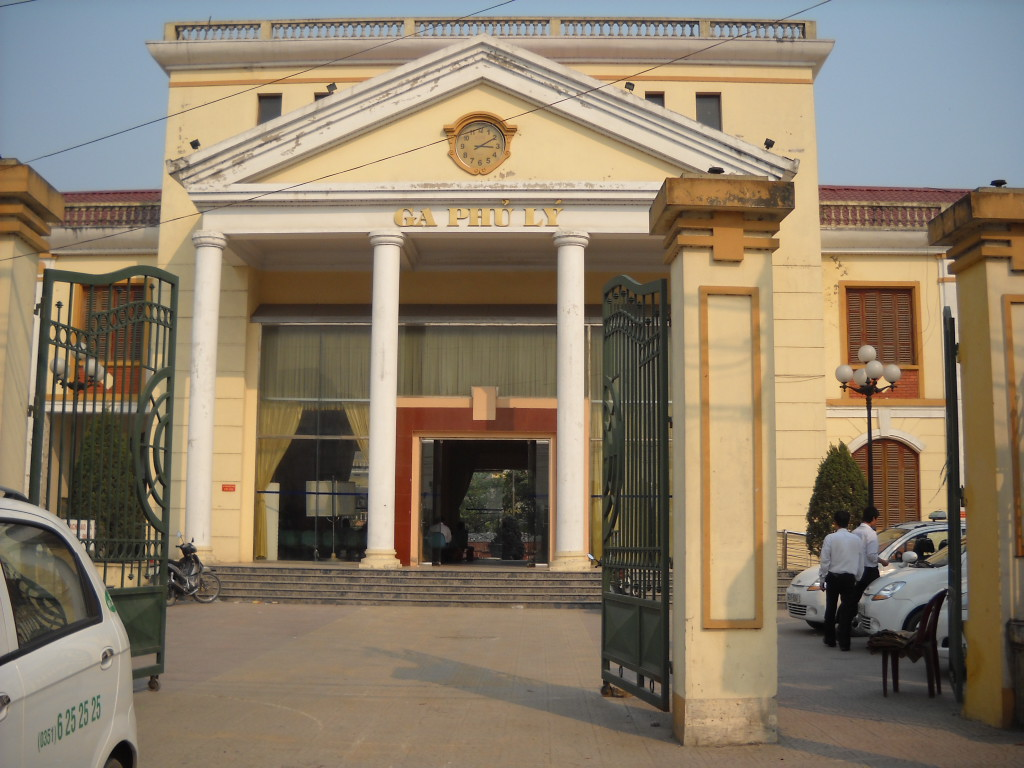
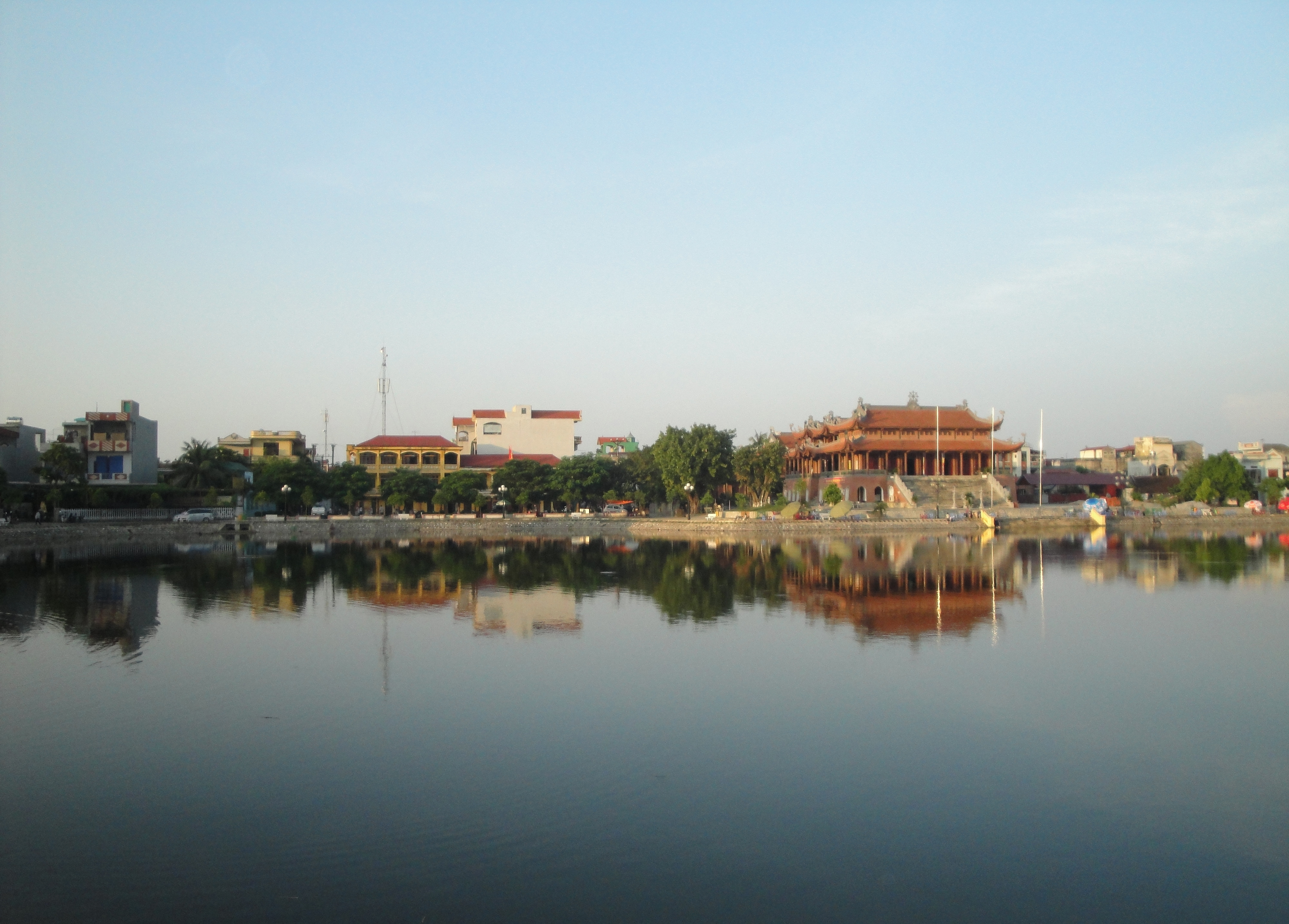
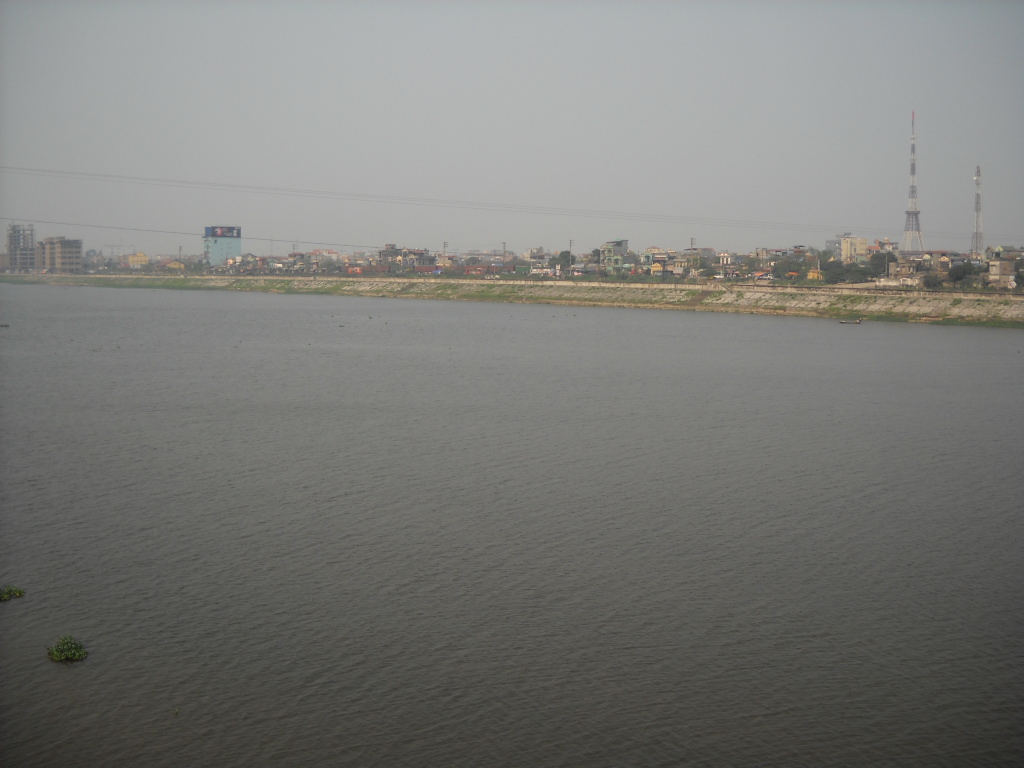
- National Route 1 through the ward Phủ Lý railway station A view of the ward at night Bầu Pagoda A view of the ward along the Đáy River
- Interactive map of Phủ Lý
- Coordinates: 20.53342926673946°N 105.91998875199855°E
- Country: Vietnam
- Region: Red River Delta
- Province: Ninh Bình
- Established: 16 June 2025
- Administrative headquarters: 39 Biên Hòa Street

Area
  - Total: 11.84 km^{2} (4.57 sq mi)

Population (2025)
  - Total: 62,893
  - Density: 5,311/km^{2} (13,760/sq mi)
- Postal code: 18128
- Website: phuly.ninhbinh.gov.vn

Phủ Lý is a ward in the northern part of Ninh Bình province, Vietnam. It is one of 129 new communes and wards in Ninh Bình province established as part of the 2025 Vietnamese administrative reforms. The ward inherited its name from the former city of Phủ Lý, the provincial capital of the former Hà Nam province.

== History ==
The area of present-day Phủ Lý Ward was formerly part of Phủ Lý, Hà Nam province.

On 12 June 2025, the National Assembly of Vietnam adopted Resolution No. 202/2025/QH15 on the reorganization of provincial-level administrative units, which merged Hà Nam province and Nam Định province into Ninh Bình province.

On 16 June 2025, the National Assembly of Vietnam adopted Resolution No. 203/2025/QH15 amending and supplementing several articles of the Constitution of Vietnam, which provided for the termination of district-level administrative units nationwide from 1 July 2025.

On the same date, the Standing Committee of the National Assembly of Vietnam issued Resolution No. 1674/NQ-UBTVQH15 on the arrangement of commune-level administrative units in Ninh Bình province in 2025. Under the resolution, the entire area and population of Châu Cầu, Thanh Châu, and Liêm Chính wards, together with part of Quang Trung Ward of the former Phủ Lý city, were merged to form a new ward named Phủ Lý.
