= Duy Tiên (town) =

Coordinates: 20.617°N 105.950°E

- District-level town (Class-4)
- Duy Tiên Town; Thị xã Duy Tiên
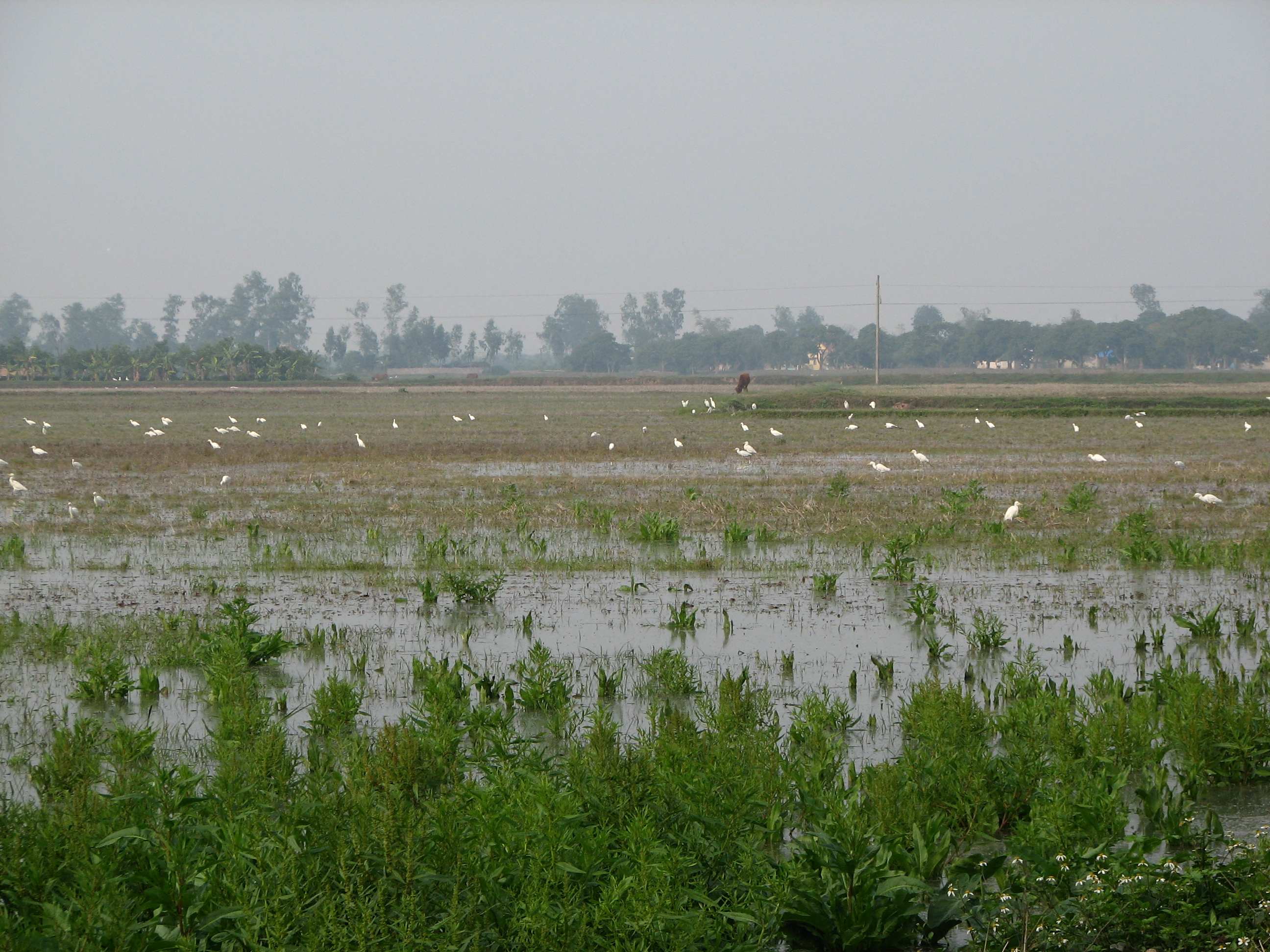
- View of Stock Field (Đồng Cò) in 2008.

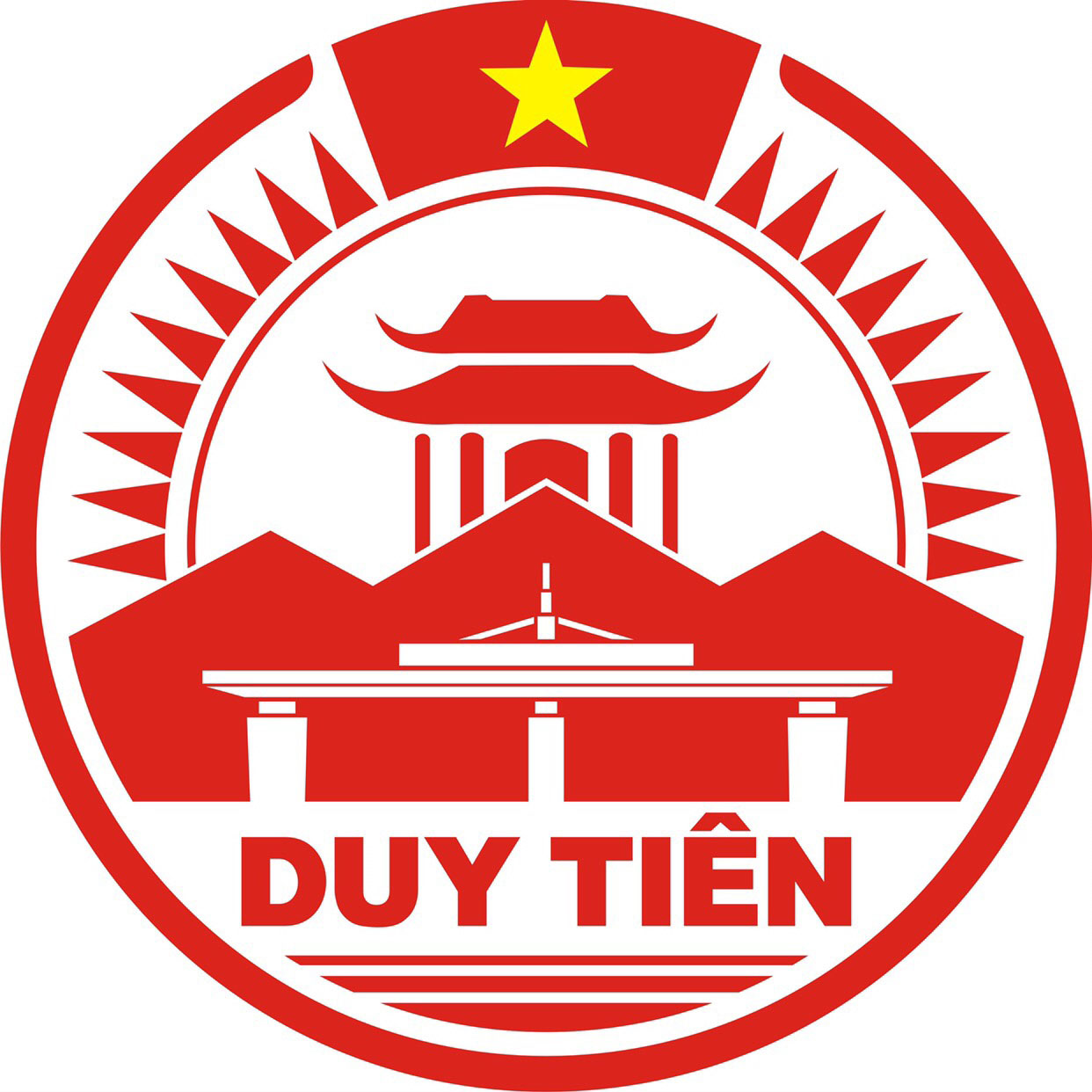
- Seal
- Country: Vietnam
- Region: Red River Delta
- Province: Hà Nam
- Capital: Hòa Mạc

Area
  - Total: 47 sq mi (121 km^{2})

Population (2018)
  - Total: 154,016
- Time zone: UTC+07:00 (Indochina Time)

Duy Tiên was formerly a town of former Hà Nam Province in the Red River Delta region of Vietnam. As of 2003, the town had a population of 131,244. The town covers an area of 134 km^{2}. The district capital lies at Hòa Mạc.

== See also ==
- Đọi Sơn Pagoda
- Châu Giang
