= Kim Thanh =

- Ward
- Interactive map of Kim Thanh
- Coordinates: 20.60716243729763°N 105.89384297460641°E
- Country: Vietnam
- Region: Red River Delta
- Province: Ninh Bình
- Established: 16 June 2025
- Administrative headquarters: Nhật Tân 5 Residential Group

Area
  - Total: 13.49 km^{2} (5.21 sq mi)

Population (2025)
  - Total: 26,050
  - Density: 1,930/km^{2} (5,000/sq mi)
- Postal code: 18326
- Website: kimthanh.ninhbinh.gov.vn

Kim Thanh is a ward in the northern part of Ninh Bình province, Vietnam. It is one of 129 new communes and wards in Ninh Bình province established as part of the 2025 Vietnamese administrative reforms. The ward inherited its name from the former Kim Thanh district, Hà Nam Ninh province, which is now part of Ninh Bình province.

On 12 June 2025, the National Assembly of Vietnam adopted Resolution No. 202/2025/QH15 on the reorganization of provincial-level administrative units (effective from 12 June 2025). Under the resolution, Hà Nam province and Nam Định province were merged into Ninh Bình province.

On 16 June 2025:

- The National Assembly of Vietnam adopted Resolution No. 203/2025/QH15 amending and supplementing several articles of the Constitution of Vietnam (effective from 16 June 2025). Under the resolution, district-level administrative units nationwide ceased to operate from 1 July 2025.
- The Standing Committee of the National Assembly of Vietnam issued Resolution No. 1674/NQ-UBTVQH15 on the arrangement of commune-level administrative units in Ninh Bình province in 2025 (effective from 16 June 2025). Under the resolution, the entire area and population of Tân Tựu ward and Hoàng Tây commune, formerly part of Kim Bảng town, were merged to form a new ward named Kim Thanh.
