= Phủ Lý (city) =

Phủ Lý Hà Nam
- Provincial city (Class-3)
- Phủ Lý City; Thành phố Phủ Lý
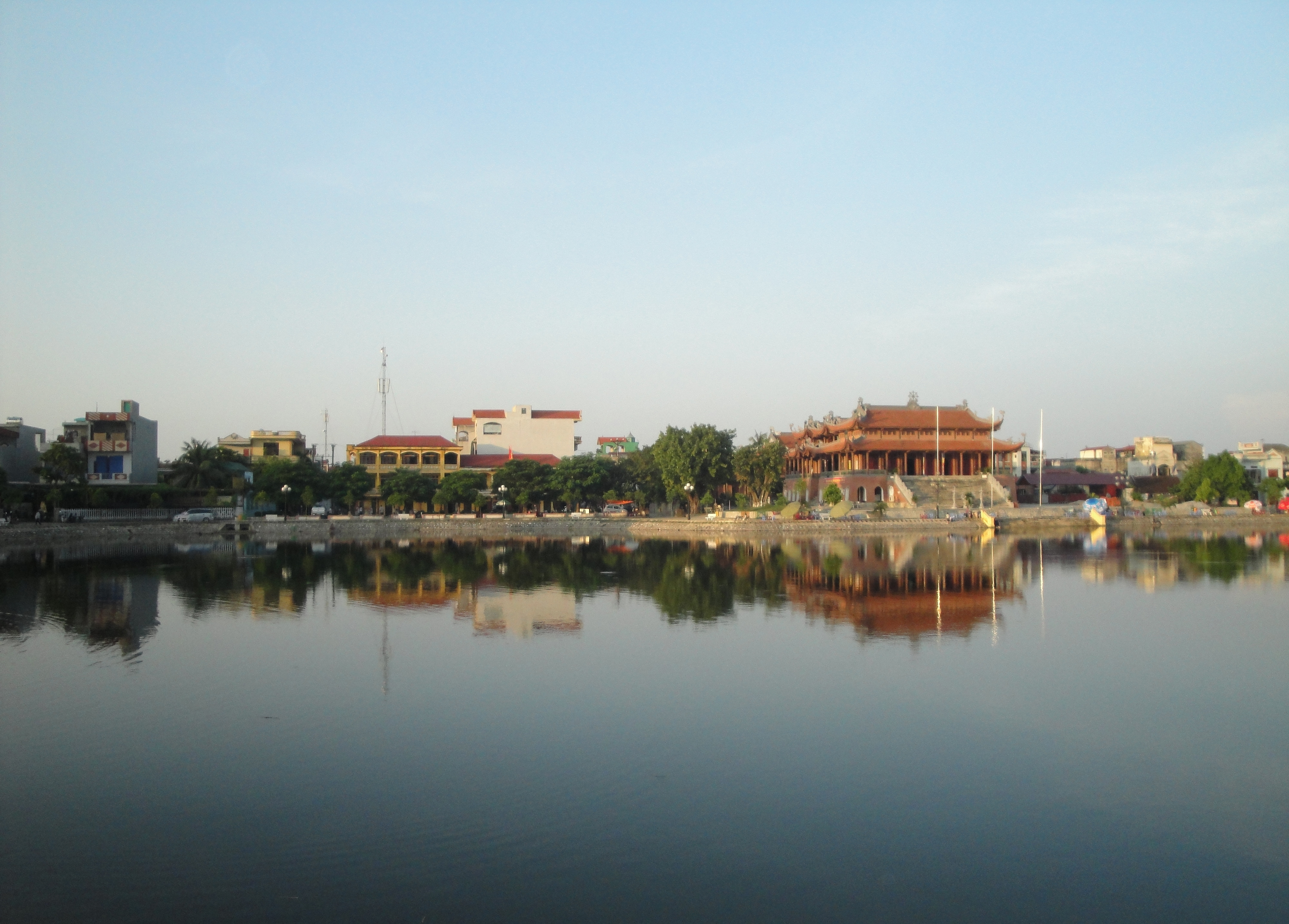
- Phủ Lý on the river Đáy

- Seal

- Location of Phủ Lý in Vietnam Phủ Lý (Southeast Asia) Phủ Lý (Asia)
- Coordinates: 20°32′28″N 105°54′50″E
- Country: Vietnam
- Province: Hà Nam

Area
  - Total: 87.87 km^{2} (33.93 sq mi)

Population (2013)
  - Total: 136,654
  - Density: 1,555.1/km^{2} (4,028/sq mi)
- Climate: Cwa
- Website: phuly.hanam.gov.vn

Phủ Lý was formerly the capital city of former Hà Nam Province of Vietnam 60 km south of Hanoi on the river Đáy.

== History ==
Phủ Lý was taken by the French canonnière l'Espingole and 28 men captained by Adrien-Paul Balny d'Avricourt on October 26 1873, shortly before Balny's death together with Francis Garnier at Hanoi's West Gate.

In the aftermath of World War II, Phủ Lý was where a significant number of VNQDĐ leaders were captured by the Việt Minh in 1946. The city was attacked by retreating French forces on June 30 1954, shortly before the country was liberated.

It was almost completely destroyed by the Americans in five days of bombing between July 14 and November 5, 1966.

Michael Maclear writes of the area afterwards as 'a wasteland without life':

"The inhabitants would have had no warning of the rain of bombs. Squadrons of B-52s flying six miles high, unseen and unheard, would systematically obliterate sections of their target, day after day. Unlike Hanoi, which was ringed with Soviet SAM missiles, here in the rural areas there was no adequate defense."

== Climate ==
Climate data for Phủ Lý
Month	Jan	Feb	Mar	Apr	May	Jun	Jul	Aug	Sep	Oct	Nov	Dec	Year
Record high °C (°F)	32.8 (91.0)	36.9 (98.4)	37.3 (99.1)	41.8 (107.2)	40.1 (104.2)	41.0 (105.8)	40.4 (104.7)	40.2 (104.4)	37.0 (98.6)	35.9 (96.6)	35.2 (95.4)	31.5 (88.7)	41.8 (107.2)
Mean daily maximum °C (°F)	19.5 (67.1)	20.3 (68.5)	22.8 (73.0)	27.1 (80.8)	31.2 (88.2)	33.1 (91.6)	33.0 (91.4)	31.8 (89.2)	30.6 (87.1)	28.5 (83.3)	25.3 (77.5)	21.7 (71.1)	27.1 (80.8)
Daily mean °C (°F)	16.4 (61.5)	17.4 (63.3)	20.0 (68.0)	23.7 (74.7)	27.2 (81.0)	29.0 (84.2)	29.2 (84.6)	28.4 (83.1)	27.2 (81.0)	24.8 (76.6)	21.5 (70.7)	18.0 (64.4)	23.6 (74.5)
Mean daily minimum °C (°F)	14.3 (57.7)	15.6 (60.1)	18.1 (64.6)	21.5 (70.7)	24.4 (75.9)	26.1 (79.0)	26.4 (79.5)	25.8 (78.4)	24.7 (76.5)	22.3 (72.1)	19.0 (66.2)	15.5 (59.9)	21.2 (70.2)
Record low °C (°F)	5.2 (41.4)	5.9 (42.6)	6.9 (44.4)	12.2 (54.0)	17.1 (62.8)	19.4 (66.9)	20.8 (69.4)	21.8 (71.2)	16.3 (61.3)	14.0 (57.2)	9.5 (49.1)	5.5 (41.9)	5.2 (41.4)
Average rainfall mm (inches)	33.5 (1.32)	29.7 (1.17)	56.4 (2.22)	87.6 (3.45)	209.1 (8.23)	243.2 (9.57)	257.8 (10.15)	307.6 (12.11)	310.0 (12.20)	215.5 (8.48)	78.6 (3.09)	34.3 (1.35)	1,862.7 (73.33)
Average rainy days	10.5	13.6	17.8	14.5	14.9	14.9	15.5	16.8	14.8	12.0	7.9	6.6	159.4
Average relative humidity (%)	84.3	86.6	88.6	88.2	85.1	82.2	82.0	85.9	85.9	83.0	81.5	80.8	84.5
Mean monthly sunshine hours	70.6	43.4	42.9	86.1	176.3	170.5	185.0	164.5	162.7	151.6	131.6	113.9	1,497.2
Source: Vietnam Institute for Building Science and Technology, Nchmf.gov.vn (August record high)

== Gallery ==
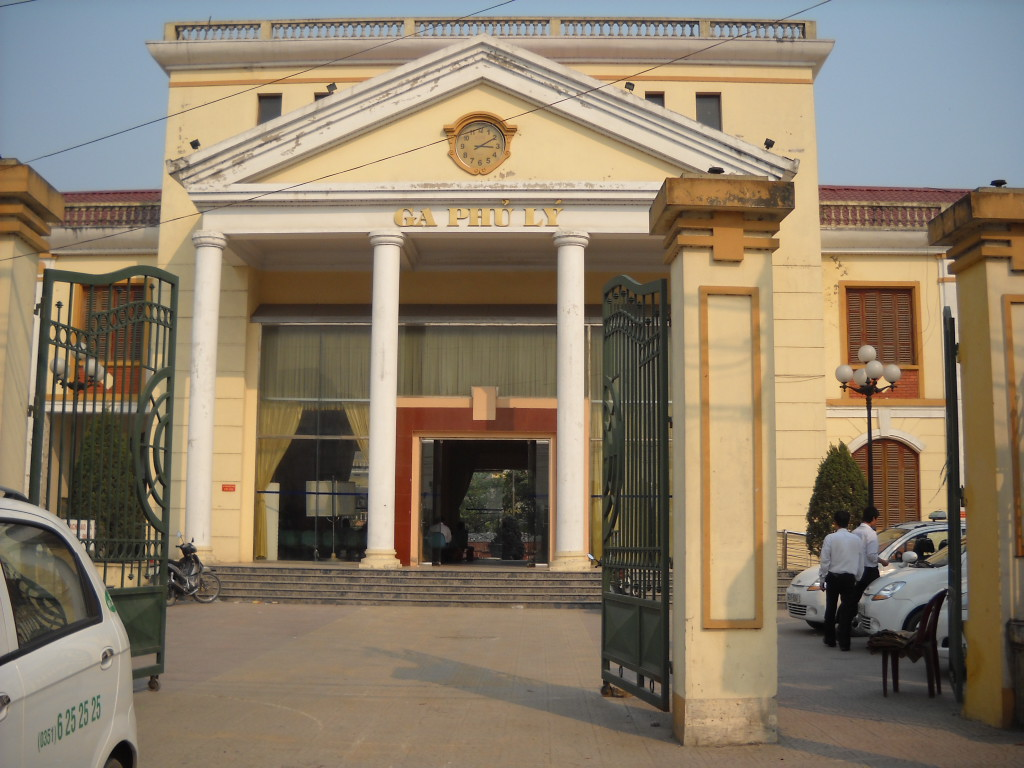
Phủ Lý railway station, Hà Nam

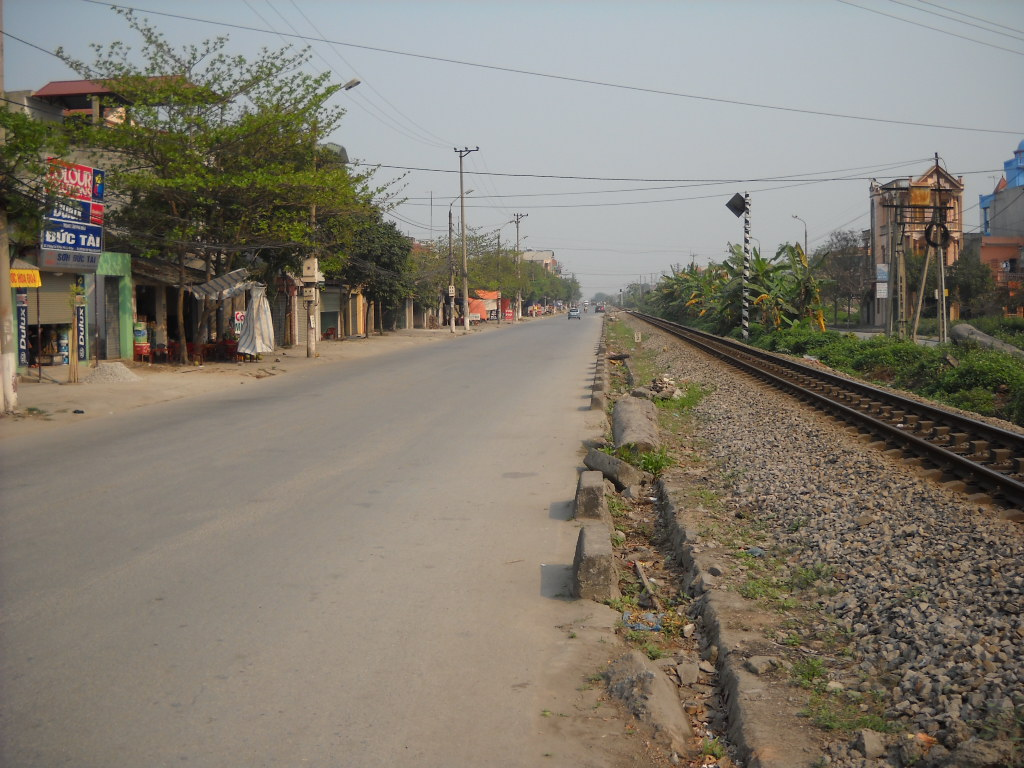
21B National Highway, the road from Phủ Lý to Nam Định

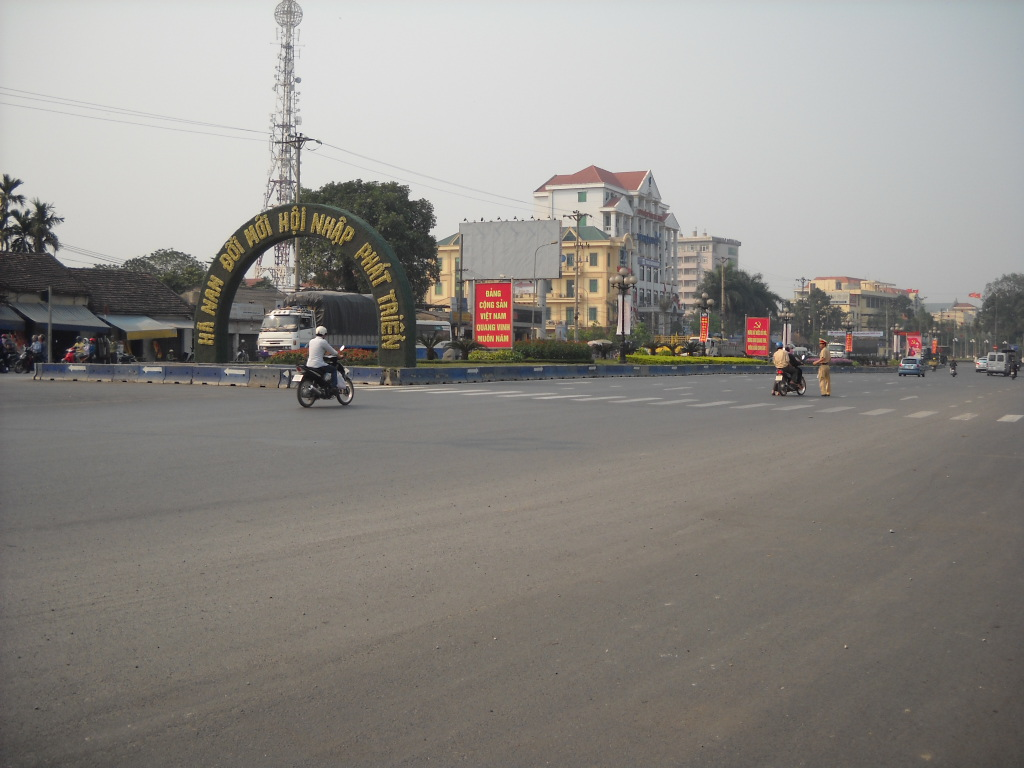
Phủ Lý City Center, Hà Nam
