= Châu Sơn =

Châu Sơn Phường Châu Sơn
- Ward
- Châu Sơn ward
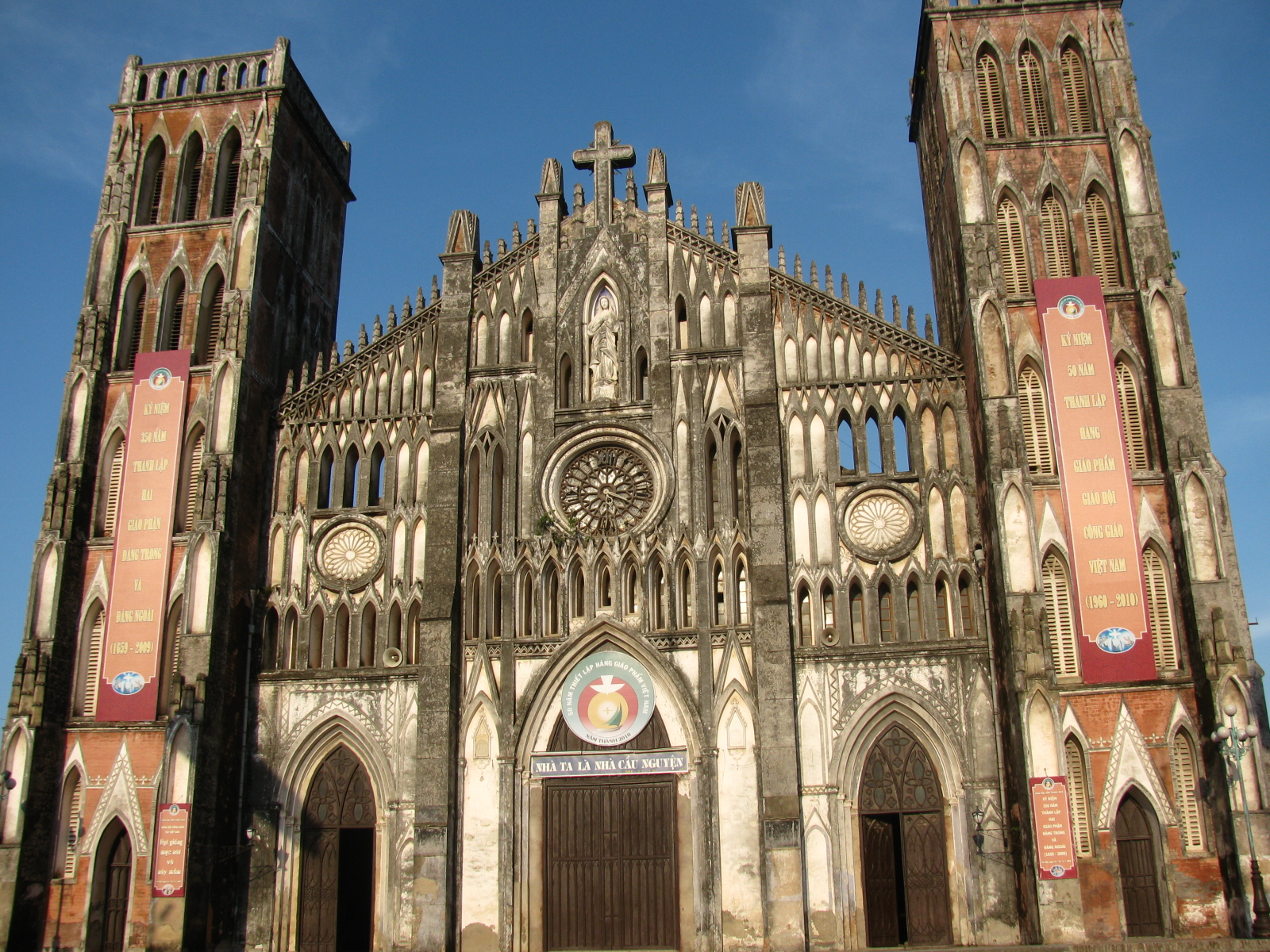
- Sở Kiện Cathedral

- Location within Vietnam
- Coordinates: 20°30′02″N 105°53′34″E
- Country: Vietnam
- Region: Red River Delta
- Province: Ninh Bình
- Time zone: UTC+7 (UTC + 7)

Châu Sơn is a ward (phường) of Ninh Bình province, Vietnam.
