= Tam Chúc =

Tam Chúc Phường Tam Chúc
- Ward
- Tam Chúc ward
- Location within Vietnam
- Coordinates: 20°33′13″N 105°48′58″E
- Country: Vietnam
- Region: Red River Delta
- Province: Ninh Bình
- Time zone: UTC+7 (UTC + 7)

Tam Chúc is a ward (phường) of Ninh Bình province, Vietnam.
