= Tiên Sơn =

- Ward
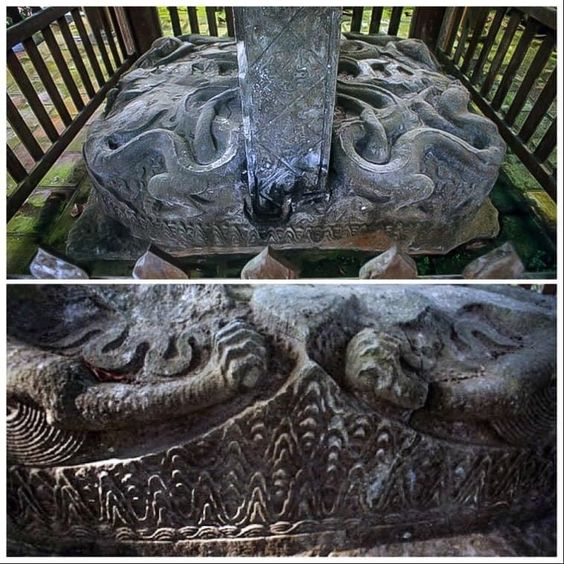
- Base of the Sùng Thiện Diên Linh stele, located at Long Đọi Sơn Pagoda
- Interactive map of Tiên Sơn
- Coordinates: 20.606961836371696°N 105.95612624992654°E
- Country: Vietnam
- Region: Red River Delta
- Province: Ninh Bình
- Established: 1 January 2020 (commune); 16 June 2025 (ward)
- Administrative headquarters: Tiên Ngoại Residential Group

Area
  - Total: 23.96 km^{2} (9.25 sq mi)

Population (2025)
  - Total: 27,062
  - Density: 1,129/km^{2} (2,920/sq mi)
- Postal code: 18219
- Website: tienson.ninhbinh.gov.vn

Tiên Sơn is a ward in Ninh Bình province, Vietnam. It is one of 129 new communes and wards in Ninh Bình province established as part of the 2025 Vietnamese administrative reforms. The ward inherited its name from Tiên Sơn commune, Duy Tiên town, Hà Nam province.

On 12 June 2025, the National Assembly of Vietnam adopted Resolution No. 202/2025/QH15 on the reorganization of provincial-level administrative units (effective from 12 June 2025). Under the resolution, the entire area and population of Hà Nam province, Nam Định province, and Ninh Bình province were reorganized to form a new province named Ninh Bình.

On 16 June 2025:

- The National Assembly of Vietnam adopted Resolution No. 203/2025/QH15 amending and supplementing several articles of the Constitution of Vietnam (effective from 16 June 2025). Under the resolution, district-level administrative units nationwide ceased to operate from 1 July 2025.
- The Standing Committee of the National Assembly of Vietnam issued Resolution No. 1674/NQ-UBTVQH15 on the arrangement of commune-level administrative units in Ninh Bình province in 2025 (effective from 16 June 2025). Under the resolution, the entire area and population of Tiên Sơn commune, part of Tiên Nội ward, and part of Tiên Ngoại commune, formerly part of Duy Tiên town, were merged to form a new ward named Tiên Sơn.
