= Kim Bảng, Ninh Bình =

Kim Bảng Phường Kim Bảng
- Ward
- Kim Bảng ward
- Location within Vietnam
- Coordinates: 20°34′40″N 105°52′23″E
- Country: Vietnam
- Region: Red River Delta
- Province: Ninh Bình
- Time zone: UTC+7 (UTC + 7)

Kim Bảng is a ward (phường) of Ninh Bình province, Vietnam.
