= Ba Vì =

Ba Vì or Ba Vi may refer to:

- Ba Vì District, a former rural district of Hanoi
- Ba Vì (commune)
- Ba Vì mountain range
- Ba Vì National Park
