= Quercus ngochoaensis =

Scientific classification
- Kingdom: Plantae
- Clade: Embryophytes
- Clade: Tracheophytes
- Clade: Angiosperms
- Clade: Eudicots
- Clade: Rosids
- Order: Fagales
- Family: Fagaceae
- Genus: Quercus
- Subgenus: Quercus subg. Cerris
- Section: Quercus sect. Cyclobalanopsis
- Species: Q. ngochoaensis

Binomial name
- Quercus ngochoaensis H.T.Binh & T.S.Hoang

Species of flowering plant

Quercus ngochoaensis is a species of oak. It is a tree endemic to Vietnam. It is known from Mt. Ngoc Hoa in Ba Vi National Park, where it grows in montane mixed broadleaf and conifer forest at 1100 metres elevation.

The species was described by Hoàng Thị Bình and Thanh Son Hoang in 2021.
