= Place names of Vietnam =

Place names of Vietnam primarily deals with Vietnamese place names meaning endonyms for places in Vietnam. The names of Vietnam itself is a distinct historical and political subject.

== Vietnam place name origins ==
The origins of Vietnam's place names are diverse. They include vernacular Vietnamese language, tribal and montagnard, Chinese language (both from the Chinese domination of Vietnam and the indigenous Confucian administration afterward 1100-1900), Champa and Khmer language names, as well as a number of names influenced by contact with traders and French Indochina. Chinese geographical terms occur frequently in the place names of Vietnam.

== Vietnamese demotic vs. Sino-Vietnamese names ==
Many rivers and mountains have two or three names. For example, the Đuống River has 3 names:

- sông Đuống - Vietnamese "river" sông, followed by a fully local Vietnamese demotic name Đuống
- sông Thiên Đức - Vietnamese "river" sông followed by a formal tên chữ in Hán "Heavenly Virtue"
- Thiên Đức giang - Chinese name "Heavenly Virtue" (天德), followed by fully Chinese word for "river" (江)

As in this example it is usual to follow Vietnamese syntax for sông prefix (placing it before the name), and Chinese syntax for suffix giang (placing it after the name). The 4th alternative Đuống giang does not (or should not) exist.

Villages often have a local Vietnamese name (often unwritten but known to people who live there), and a formal Hán tên chữ name assigned by Vietnamese Confucian administrators in previous centuries for taxation and other purposes. Larger towns and Cities however generally only have 1 name - though historically a local demotic name may be remembered, or, as in the case of Saigon, the local purely Vietnamese name may have grown into the official name and a Chinese name created to mimic the sound of the Vietnamese name.

== Changing names ==
=== Names of states and provinces ===
In addition to the many changes of the names of Vietnam, states such Tonkin and Cochinchina, provinces have had many changes due to administrative and political changes.

=== Changing names of capitals and major cities ===
Hanoi has had many names. Many other cities have also experienced name changes.

=== District and Street names ===
The District and Street names of Vietnam's cities have been fluid in recent history. The French gave French names to most of the streets of Hanoi, Saigon and other major cities, often ignorant of existing Vietnamese names. When French control of Vietnam ended in 1954, these names were replaced in both the North and the South.
