= Sơn Tây (town) =

Sơn Tây Town Thị xã Sơn Tây Tỉnh Sơn Tây
- District-level town
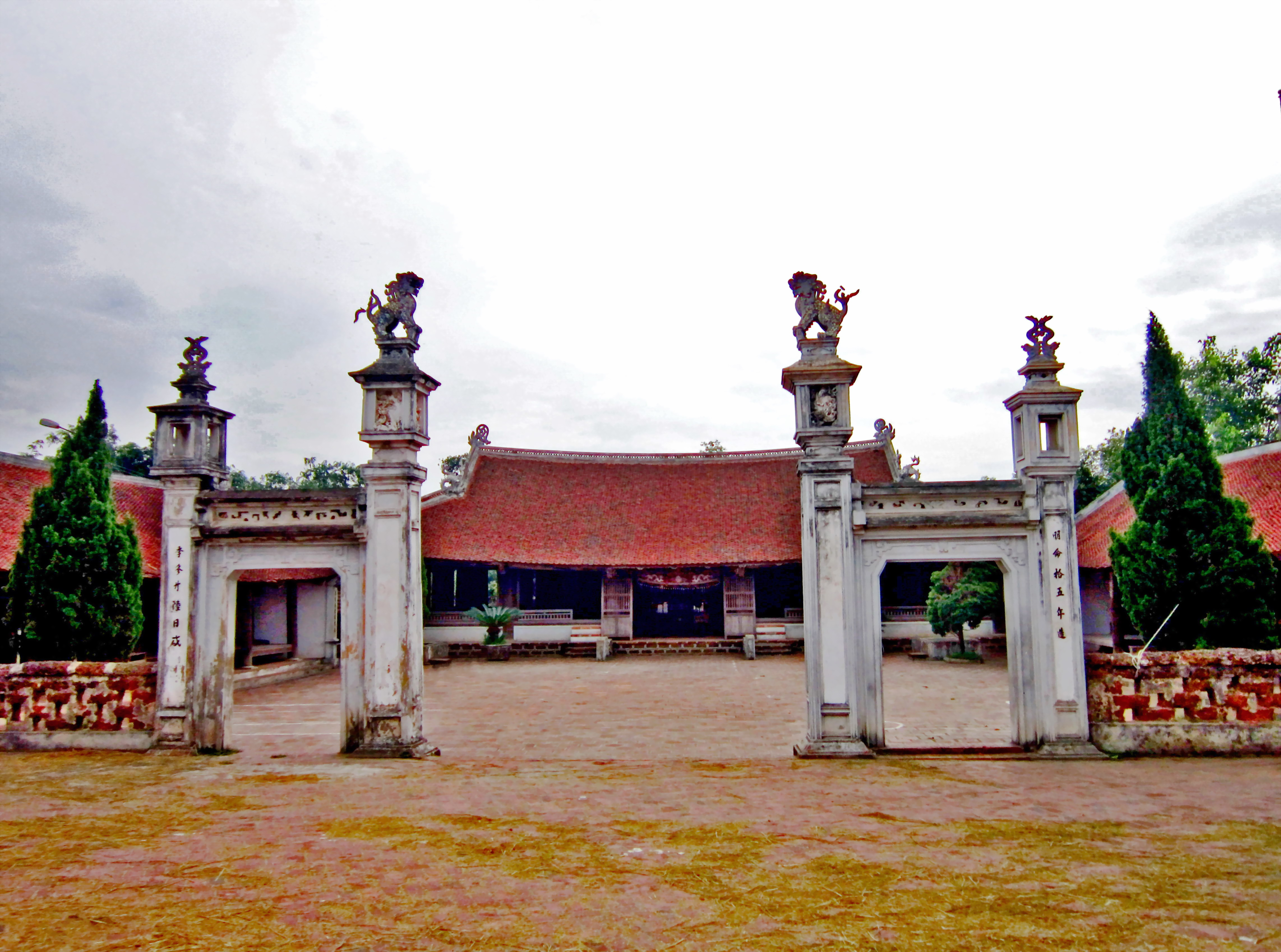
- View of Mông Phụ communal hall.

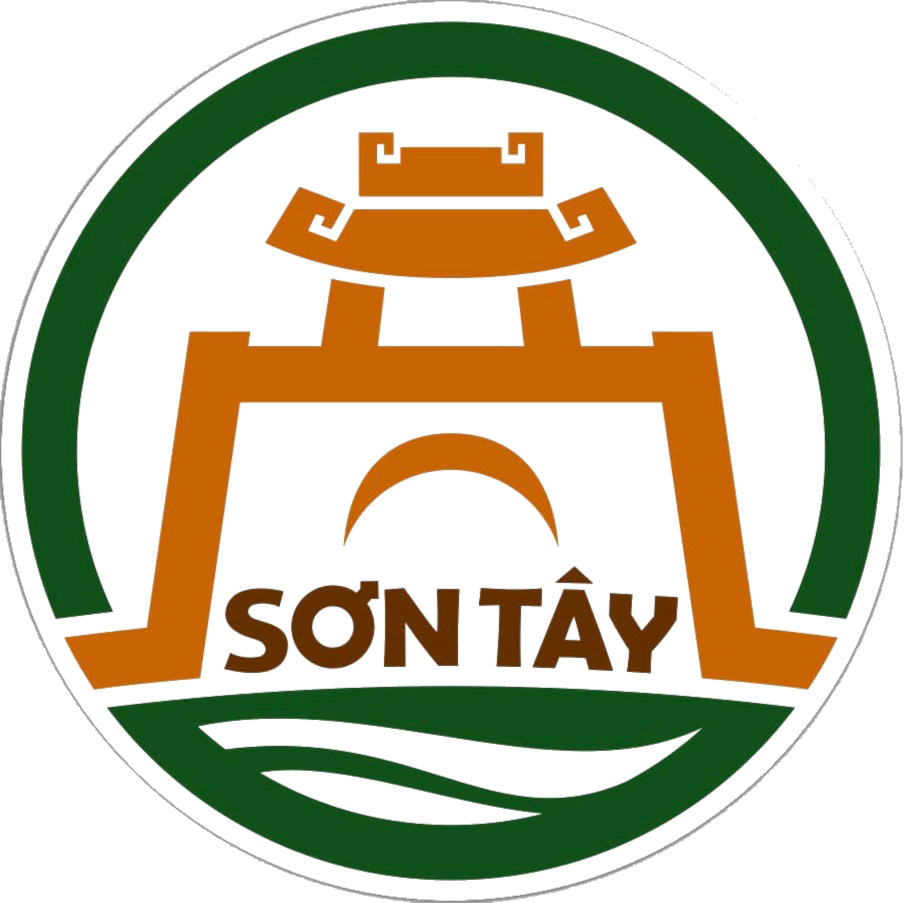
- Seal
- Interactive map of Sơn Tây Town
- Location within Vietnam
- Country: Vietnam
- Region: Red River Delta
- Municipality: Hà Nội
- Established: May 8, 2009
- Dissolved: June 16, 2025

Government
  - Type: Ward-level authority
  - People Committee's Chairman: Nguyễn Thị Thu Hương
  - People Council's Chairman: Ngô Đình Ngũ
  - Front Committee's Chairman: Hứa Đức Tuấn
  - Party Committee's Secretary: Ngô Đình Ngũ

Area
  - Total: 113.5 km^{2} (43.8 sq mi)

Population (April 1, 2019)
  - Total: 230,577
  - Density: 2,032/km^{2} (5,262/sq mi)
  - Ethnicities: Kinh
- Time zone: UTC+7 (Indochina Time)
- ZIP code: 10000–12700 (Note: An official code from December 31, 2023, to present.)
- Climate: Cwa
- Website: sontay.hanoi.gov.vn

Sơn Tây (IPA: [ʂɤ̄n tʌ̄j],) is a former district-level town of Hanoi, the capital of Vietnam.

== History ==
The name Sơn Tây means "the west of the mountain", which was derived from its geographical location. This term Sơn Tây only referred to the Old Citadel, which lies to the northwest of Tản Viên Peak.

=== 20th century ===
The town used to be Sơn Tây city, which was the capital of Sơn Tây province before merging with Hà Đông province to form Hà Tây province in 1965. Sơn Tây lies 35 kilometres (22 mi) west of the capital Hanoi. However, when Hà Tây was absorbed into Hanoi, Sơn Tây was demoted from a city to a town.

It is often referred to as “soldier town” due to the proliferation of army barracks and military institutions that surrounds the town, including the Vietnamese People's Army Infantry Academy.

=== 21st century ===
Sơn Tây's future is seen as being very much that of a satellite city of Hanoi and as a result there are plans to relocate universities and other public facilities to Sơn Tây where land is cheaper and more plentiful. The government has planned to complete this project by duplicating the main Hanoi—Sơn Tây carriageway which is expected to be completed in 2009.

== Culture ==
Sơn Tây is known for its thousand year old villages, such as Đường Lâm which retains a collection of vernacular architecture with buildings and temples built using laterite bricks. Và Temple, or Đông Cung, dedicated to Tản Viên, is located on a hill covered with ironwood trees in Vân Giã hamlet, Trung Hưng commune. (Note: Minh Trị Lưu - Historical remains & beautiful places of Hanoi and the surrounding areas - Page 204 ▪︎ 2000 "Và Temple locates on a hill covered with green of old-age ironwood trees in Vân Gia hamlet, Trung Hưng ward, Sơn Tây town. Và Temple is differently called Đông Cung (East palace), dedicating to God Tản Viên".) Phạm Văn Đổng, a general of the Republic of Vietnam, was from Sơn Tây.

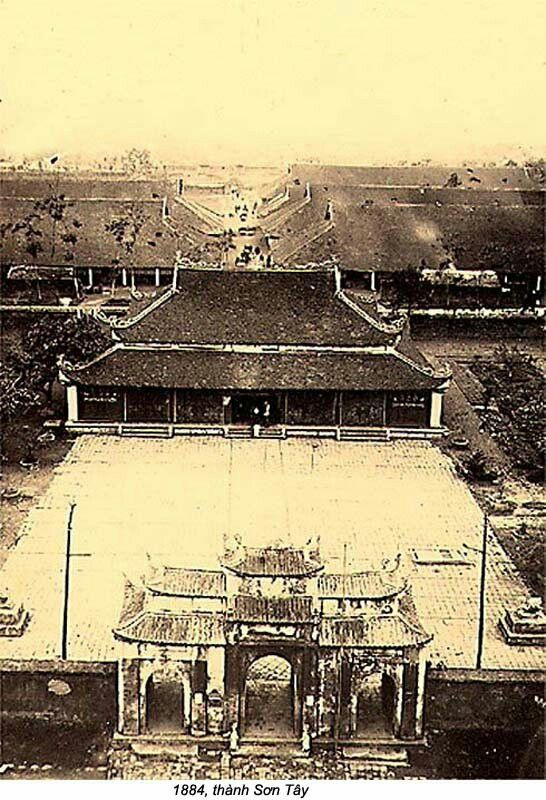
Sơn Tây citadel, 1884

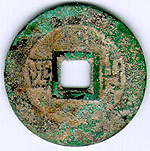
A Vietnamese cash coin with the characters Sơn Tây (山西) written on it from right-to-left. This coin was produced by the Sơn Tây Mint.

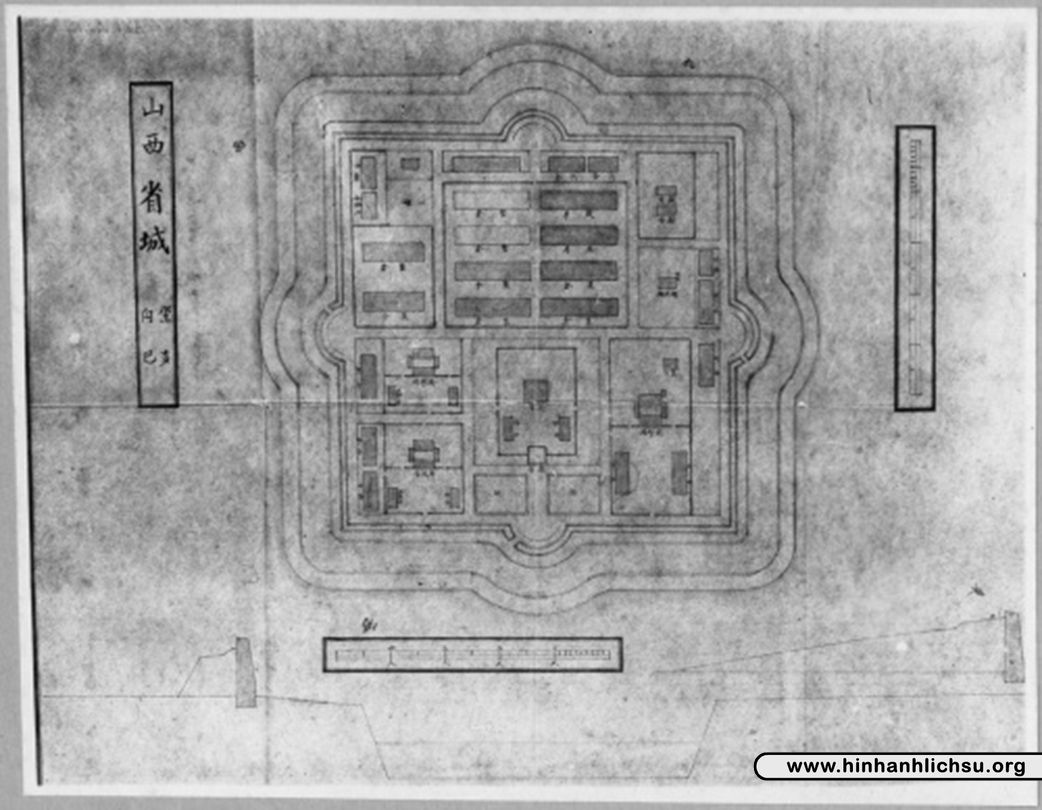
Drawing of Sơn Tây citadel in the Nguyễn dynasty

== Geography ==
=== Climate ===
Climate data for Sơn Tây Ward
Month	Jan	Feb	Mar	Apr	May	Jun	Jul	Aug	Sep	Oct	Nov	Dec	Year
Record high °C (°F)	31.4 (88.5)	34.0 (93.2)	38.0 (100.4)	40.4 (104.7)	40.5 (104.9)	41.6 (106.9)	40.1 (104.2)	39.1 (102.4)	37.5 (99.5)	35.6 (96.1)	34.0 (93.2)	31.2 (88.2)	41.6 (106.9)
Mean daily maximum °C (°F)	19.7 (67.5)	20.7 (69.3)	23.4 (74.1)	27.7 (81.9)	31.8 (89.2)	33.2 (91.8)	33.2 (91.8)	32.5 (90.5)	31.5 (88.7)	29.3 (84.7)	25.8 (78.4)	22.1 (71.8)	27.6 (81.7)
Daily mean °C (°F)	16.3 (61.3)	17.6 (63.7)	20.2 (68.4)	24.0 (75.2)	27.2 (81.0)	28.9 (84.0)	28.9 (84.0)	28.4 (83.1)	27.3 (81.1)	25.0 (77.0)	21.5 (70.7)	17.9 (64.2)	23.6 (74.5)
Mean daily minimum °C (°F)	14.1 (57.4)	15.6 (60.1)	18.2 (64.8)	21.5 (70.7)	24.2 (75.6)	25.9 (78.6)	26.0 (78.8)	25.7 (78.3)	24.7 (76.5)	22.3 (72.1)	18.5 (65.3)	15.3 (59.5)	21.1 (70.0)
Record low °C (°F)	4.6 (40.3)	5.4 (41.7)	4.5 (40.1)	13.0 (55.4)	17.3 (63.1)	20.4 (68.7)	19.5 (67.1)	19.8 (67.6)	17.2 (63.0)	14.4 (57.9)	9.2 (48.6)	5.1 (41.2)	4.5 (40.1)
Average rainfall mm (inches)	25.6 (1.01)	24.6 (0.97)	43.3 (1.70)	96.1 (3.78)	216.6 (8.53)	262.9 (10.35)	311.8 (12.28)	314.6 (12.39)	224.3 (8.83)	158.4 (6.24)	63.0 (2.48)	22.0 (0.87)	1,751.2 (68.94)
Average rainy days	9.7	11.1	14.6	13.5	15.5	15.6	16.9	16.5	13.1	9.7	6.9	6.0	149.1
Average relative humidity (%)	83.8	85.0	86.7	87.2	84.6	82.9	83.6	85.4	84.6	82.4	81.3	80.4	84.0
Mean monthly sunshine hours	65.5	48.8	49.3	91.6	172.4	165.4	181.1	173.4	170.5	151.3	130.5	108.9	1,494.7
Source: Vietnam Institute for Building Science and Technology

== See also ==
- Ba Vì
- Đan Phượng
- Phúc Thọ
