= Ba Vì district =

Ba Vì district Huyện Ba Vì
- District
- Seal

- Map of Hanoi area
- Interactive map of Ba Vì district
- Location within Vietnam
- Coordinates: 21.198884°N 105.423679°E
- Country: Vietnam
- Region: Red River Delta
- Municipality: Hanoi
- Capital: Tây Đằng

Area
  - Total: 165 sq mi (428 km^{2})

Population (2003)
  - Total: 265,000
  - Density: 1,600/sq mi (619/km^{2})
- Time zone: UTC+7 (Indochina Time)
- Website: bavi.hanoi.gov.vn

Ba Vì is a former district of Hanoi, Vietnam. Ba Vì district was established on July 26, 1968.

== History ==
Ba Vì was consolidated basis of the old districts Bất Bạt, Tùng Thiện and Quảng Oai, Hà Tây province. From 1975 to 1978, Ba Vì district belonged to Hà Sơn Bình province, and from 1978 to 1991, it belonged to Hanoi city. In 1982, seven communes: Cổ Đông, Đường Lâm, Kim Sơn, Sơn Đông, Thanh Mỹ, Trung Sơn Trầm and Xuân Sơn, were managed by Sơn Tây town; and two communes: Tích Giang and Trạch Mỹ Lộc, were managed by Phúc Thọ district. In 1987, Quảng Oai town was established and belonged to Hà Tây from 1991 to 2008. In 1994, the town of Quảng Oai and Tây Đằng commune were consolidated to form Tây Đằng town. From August 1, 2008, Ba Vì became a district of Hanoi again. At the same time, Tân Đức moved to the management of Việt Trì city, Phú Thọ province.

Ba Vì is the large supplied province for cow milk in Vietnam which is farmed and taken care well for dairy production.

Ba Vì is known for its Muslim mixed Moroccan population who defected from French Far East Expeditionary Corps during the Indochina War and intermarried with local Viet women here.

== Geography ==
Ba Vì is the district lying in northwest Hanoi, containing a majority of Ba Vì mountain running through the south of the district. It borders Sơn Tây town to the east and Thạch Thất to the southeast. It also borders Lương Sơn district to the southeast and Kỳ Sơn of Hòa Bình province to the southwest. To the north, the district is bordered by Việt Trì City, Phú Thọ, with the boundary of the Red River (Thao River) located in the north. Bordering the west of the district are Lâm Thao, Tam Nông and Thanh Thủy districts of Phú Thọ. Ba Vì is also bordered by Vĩnh Tường district, Vĩnh Phúc province to the northeast via the boundary of the Red River.

Ba Vì has an area of 428.0 km^{2}, the largest district of Hanoi, which includes two large lakes: Suối Hai Lake and Đồng Mô Lake (at Đồng Mô tourist area); both are artificial lakes being located in the watershed of the Tích River, which flows through Sơn Tây town and some western districts of Hanoi, which then flows into the Đáy river. Notably Ba Vì National Park is an important destination in the district. At the boundaries of the district and Phú Thọ province, there are two junctions: Trung Hà junction between the Đà River and the Red River (in Phong Vân) and the Bạch Hạc junction between the Red River and the Lô River (Tân Hồng and Phú Cường communes, opposite to Việt Trì city).

== Districts ==
The four location points are as follows:

- The north limit is Phú Cường commune.
- The west limit is Thuần Mỹ commune.
- The south limit is Khánh Thượng commune.
- The east limit is Cam Thượng commune.

== Climate ==
Climate data for Ba Vì District
Month	Jan	Feb	Mar	Apr	May	Jun	Jul	Aug	Sep	Oct	Nov	Dec	Year
Record high °C (°F)	31.9 (89.4)	34.8 (94.6)	38.9 (102.0)	41.2 (106.2)	41.6 (106.9)	40.8 (105.4)	39.6 (103.3)	39.0 (102.2)	37.3 (99.1)	35.5 (95.9)	35.0 (95.0)	32.4 (90.3)	41.6 (106.9)
Mean daily maximum °C (°F)	19.4 (66.9)	20.7 (69.3)	23.3 (73.9)	27.6 (81.7)	31.5 (88.7)	33.1 (91.6)	32.9 (91.2)	32.4 (90.3)	31.4 (88.5)	29.0 (84.2)	25.5 (77.9)	21.8 (71.2)	27.4 (81.3)
Daily mean °C (°F)	16.0 (60.8)	17.6 (63.7)	20.2 (68.4)	24.0 (75.2)	27.1 (80.8)	28.7 (83.7)	28.7 (83.7)	28.1 (82.6)	27.0 (80.6)	24.5 (76.1)	21.0 (69.8)	17.4 (63.3)	23.4 (74.1)
Mean daily minimum °C (°F)	13.7 (56.7)	15.5 (59.9)	17.9 (64.2)	21.5 (70.7)	24.0 (75.2)	25.6 (78.1)	25.7 (78.3)	25.3 (77.5)	24.2 (75.6)	21.7 (71.1)	17.9 (64.2)	14.4 (57.9)	20.6 (69.1)
Record low °C (°F)	4.0 (39.2)	6.1 (43.0)	7.0 (44.6)	12.4 (54.3)	17.1 (62.8)	20.1 (68.2)	19.9 (67.8)	21.0 (69.8)	17.3 (63.1)	12.8 (55.0)	6.7 (44.1)	2.8 (37.0)	2.8 (37.0)
Average rainfall mm (inches)	27.4 (1.08)	32.8 (1.29)	51.9 (2.04)	97.2 (3.83)	263.4 (10.37)	276.1 (10.87)	328.0 (12.91)	344.9 (13.58)	245.4 (9.66)	189.9 (7.48)	56.2 (2.21)	22.4 (0.88)	1,935.6 (76.20)
Average rainy days	11.0	12.0	15.5	14.6	16.5	16.5	17.4	17.0	13.2	10.6	7.1	5.9	157.6
Average relative humidity (%)	84.7	86.0	86.6	86.8	84.2	82.5	83.7	85.8	84.5	83.0	81.6	81.3	84.3
Mean monthly sunshine hours	63.2	50.3	48.2	78.9	157.0	160.8	173.3	170.9	175.1	151.8	134.4	115.0	1,477.2
Source: Vietnam Institute for Building Science and Technology

== Population ==
According to the results of the 2019 Population Census, Ba Vì district's population is more than 290,000, including the Kinh, Muong and Dao ethnicities.

== Administration ==
Before merging into Hanoi, Ba Vì district had 1 town and 31 communes. On August 1, 2008, as well as other districts of Hà Tây province, Ba Vì district merged into Hanoi. Before that, however, on July 10, 2008, the total natural area of 454.08 ha and the population of 2,701 people of Tân Đức commune was merged into Việt Trì City, Phú Thọ (according to the Decree of the 3rd session, the XII Congress on adjusting the administrative boundary between Hà Tây and Phú Thọ provinces).

Currently, Ba Vì district has one town (Tây Đằng) and 30 communes: Ba Trại, Ba Vì, Cẩm Lĩnh, Cam Thượng, Châu Sơn, Chu Minh, Cổ Đô, Đông Quang, Đồng Thái, Khánh Thượng, Minh Châu, Minh Quang, Phong Vân, Phú Châu, Phú Cường, Phú Đông, Phú Phương, Phú Sơn, Sơn Đà, Tản Hồng, Tản Lĩnh, Thái Hòa, Thuần Mỹ, Thụy An, Tiên Phong, Tòng Bạt, Vân Hòa, Vạn Thắng, Vật Lại and Yên Bài.

== Traffic ==
- Roads: The district has National Highway 32 that runs through Tây Đằng town, connects Sơn Tây with Hưng Hóa, Phú Thọ province and the Northern-Northwest provinces. On this highway, the last part at Thái Hòa commune has Trung Hà bridge, spanning the Đà River.
- Waterways: Red River, the Đà River and the Tích River
