= Names of Vietnam =

Linguistic history of country name

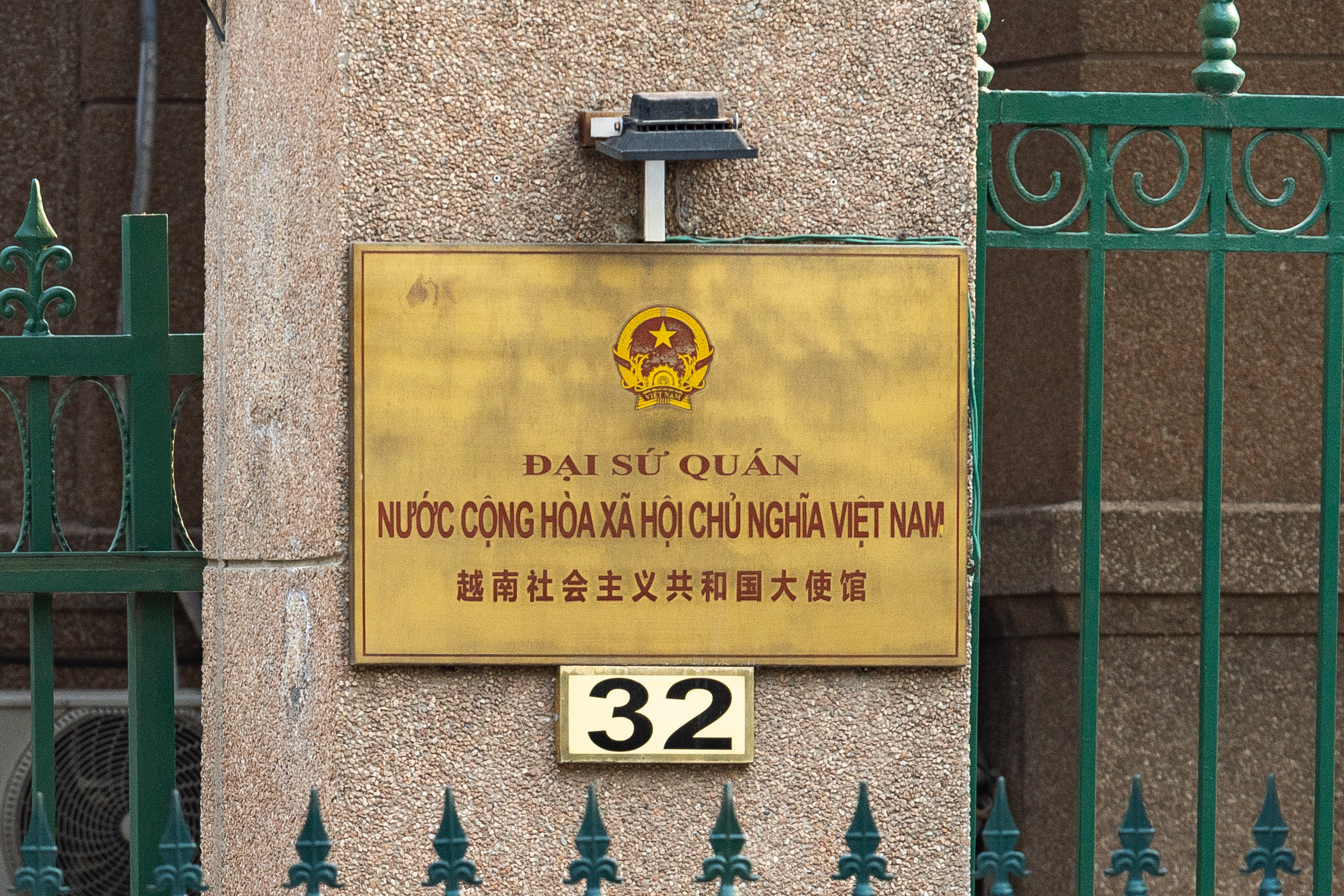
Plaque of the Embassy of the Socialist Republic of Viet Nam in Beijing, being inscribed in standard Vietnamese and Chinese.

History of Vietnam
(by names of Vietnam)
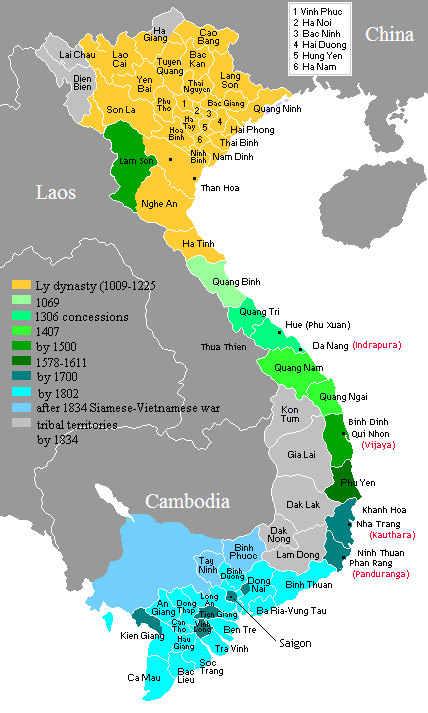

~2879–2524 BC	Xích Quỷ (Note: legendary)
~700–258 BC	Văn Lang
257–179 BC	Âu Lạc
204–111 BC	Nam Việt
111 BC – 40 AD	Giao Chỉ
40–43	Lĩnh Nam
43–203	Giao Chỉ
203–544	Giao Châu
544–602	Vạn Xuân
602–679	Giao Châu
679–757	An Nam
757–766	Trấn Nam
766–866	An Nam
866–968	Tĩnh Hải quân
968–1054	Đại Cồ Việt
1054–1400	Đại Việt
1400–1407	Đại Ngu
1407–1427	Giao Chỉ
1428–1804	Đại Việt
1804–1839	Việt Nam
1839–1945	Đại Nam
1887–1954	Đông Dương
1945–	Việt Nam
Main template
History of Vietnam

Throughout its history, Vietnam has been referred to by many names, either for the whole country or parts of it.

== History ==
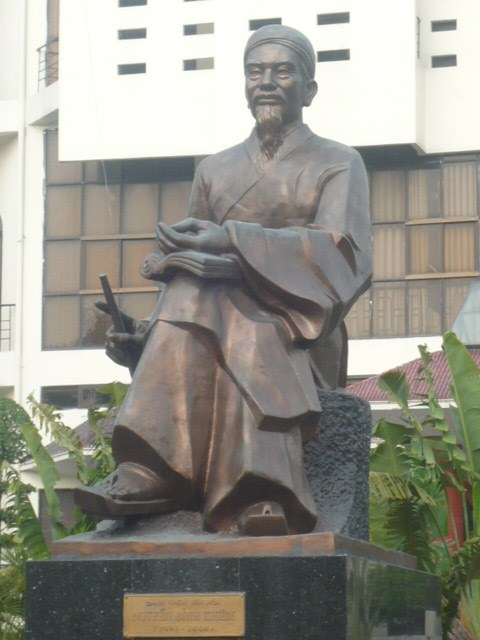
The endonym Vietnam was supposedly coined by 16th century poet Nguyễn Bỉnh Khiêm.

Throughout the history of Vietnam, official and unofficial names have been used in reference to the territory of Vietnam. Its early northern polity was called Văn Lang during the Hồng Bàng dynasty, Âu Lạc under Thục dynasty, Nam Việt during the Triệu dynasty, Vạn Xuân during the Early Lý dynasty, Đại Cồ Việt during the Đinh dynasty and Early Lê dynasty. Starting in 1054, the country was called Đại Việt (Great Việt). During the Hồ dynasty, Vietnam was called Đại Ngu.

Việt Nam ( in Vietnamese) is a variation of Nam Việt (Southern Việt), a name that can be traced back to the Triệu dynasty (2nd century BC, also known as Nanyue Kingdom). The word Việt originated as a shortened form of Bách Việt, a word used to refer to a people who lived in what used to be southern China, during ancient times. The name Việt Nam, with the syllables in the modern order, first appears in the 16th century in a poem attributed to Nguyễn Bỉnh Khiêm. Vietnam was mentioned in Josiah Conder's 1834 Dictionary of Geography, Ancient and Modern as the other name to refer to Annam.

Annam, which originated as a Chinese name in the seventh century, remained the common name for the country until and during the French colonial period. Nationalist writer Phan Bội Châu revived the name Vietnam in the early 20th century. From 1945, when rival communist and anti-communist governments were established, both adopted this as the country's official name. In English, the two syllables are usually combined into one word, Vietnam. However, Viet Nam is still recognized as the standard name by the United Nations, by ISO and by the Vietnamese government, with the government even recently endorsing using Viet Nam over Vietnam. In the past, the hyphenated spelling "Viet-Nam" was the standardized spelling for the country being recognized by all three Vietnamese governments (Democratic Republic of Viet-Nam, Republic of Viet-Nam and Republic of South Viet-Nam); however, this spelling has become obsoleted in modern context.

=== Origin of Vietnam ===
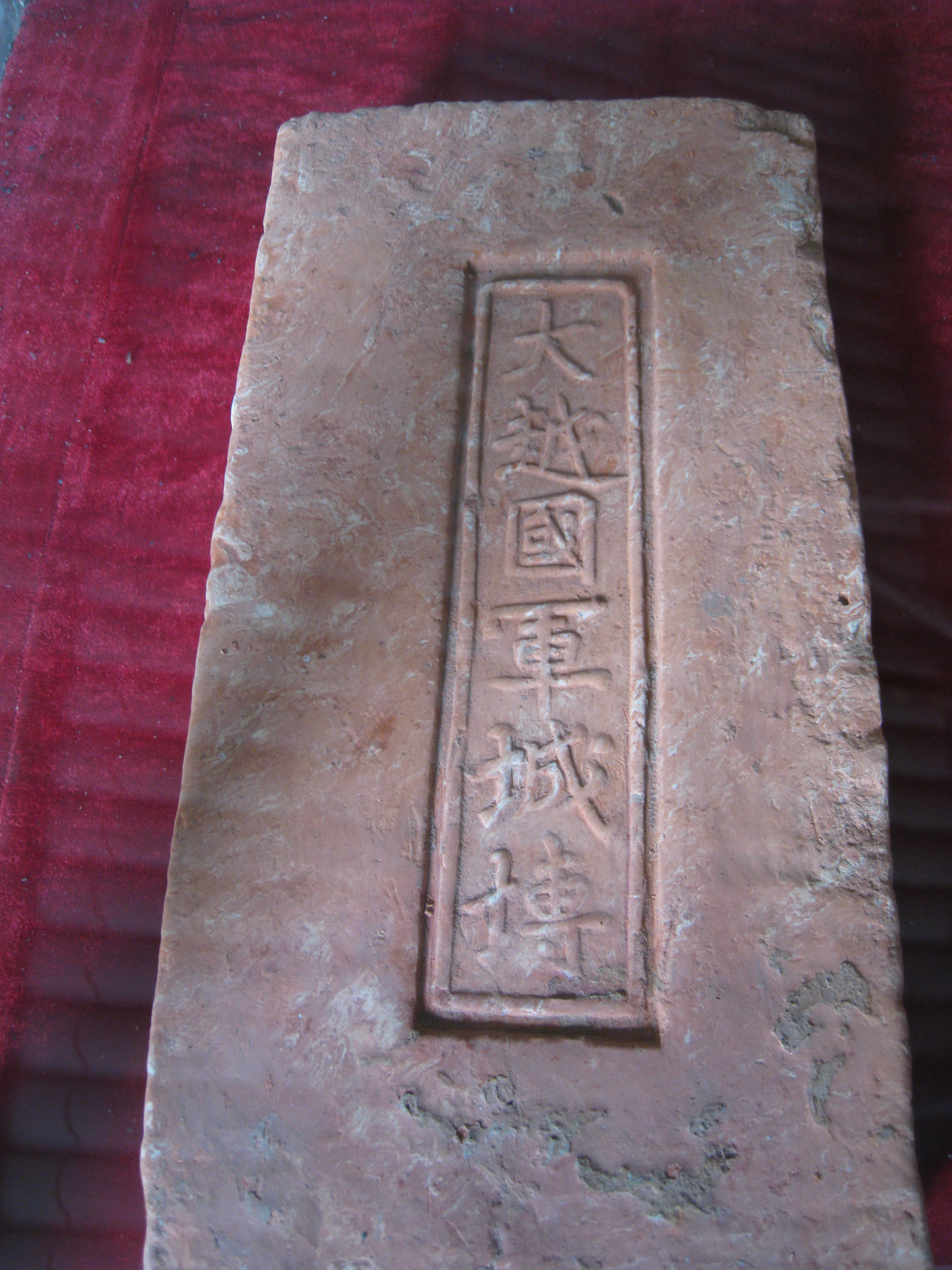
10th century brick with Chữ Hán inscription: 大越國軍城塼 "Brick [to build] the Đại Việt State's military forts"

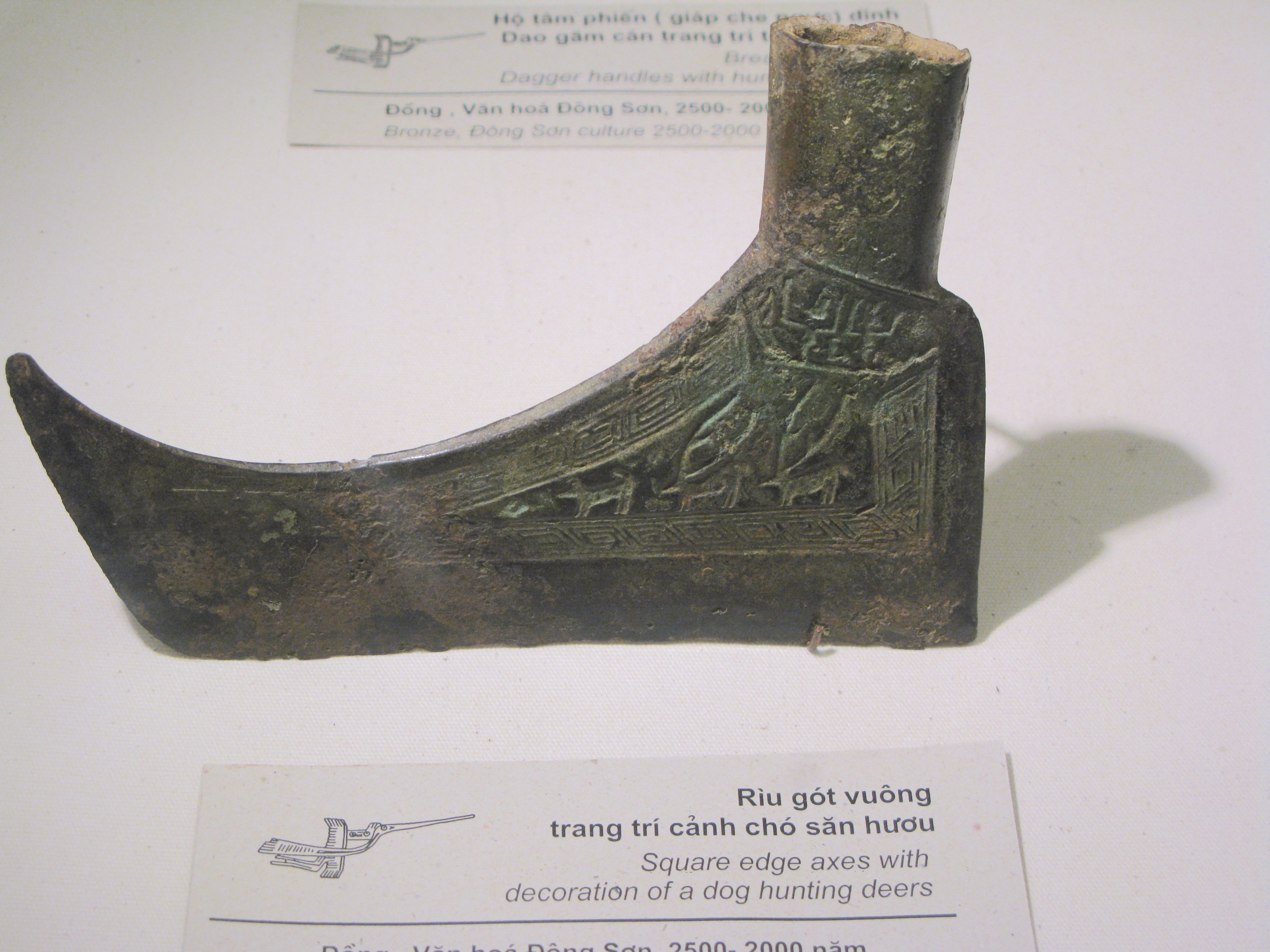
Scholar consensus believes that the exonym of Yue, Yueh, and Viet peoples are related to their notorious axes. A bronze ax from Dong Son burial site, Thanh Hoa, North-central Vietnam, dated 500 BC.

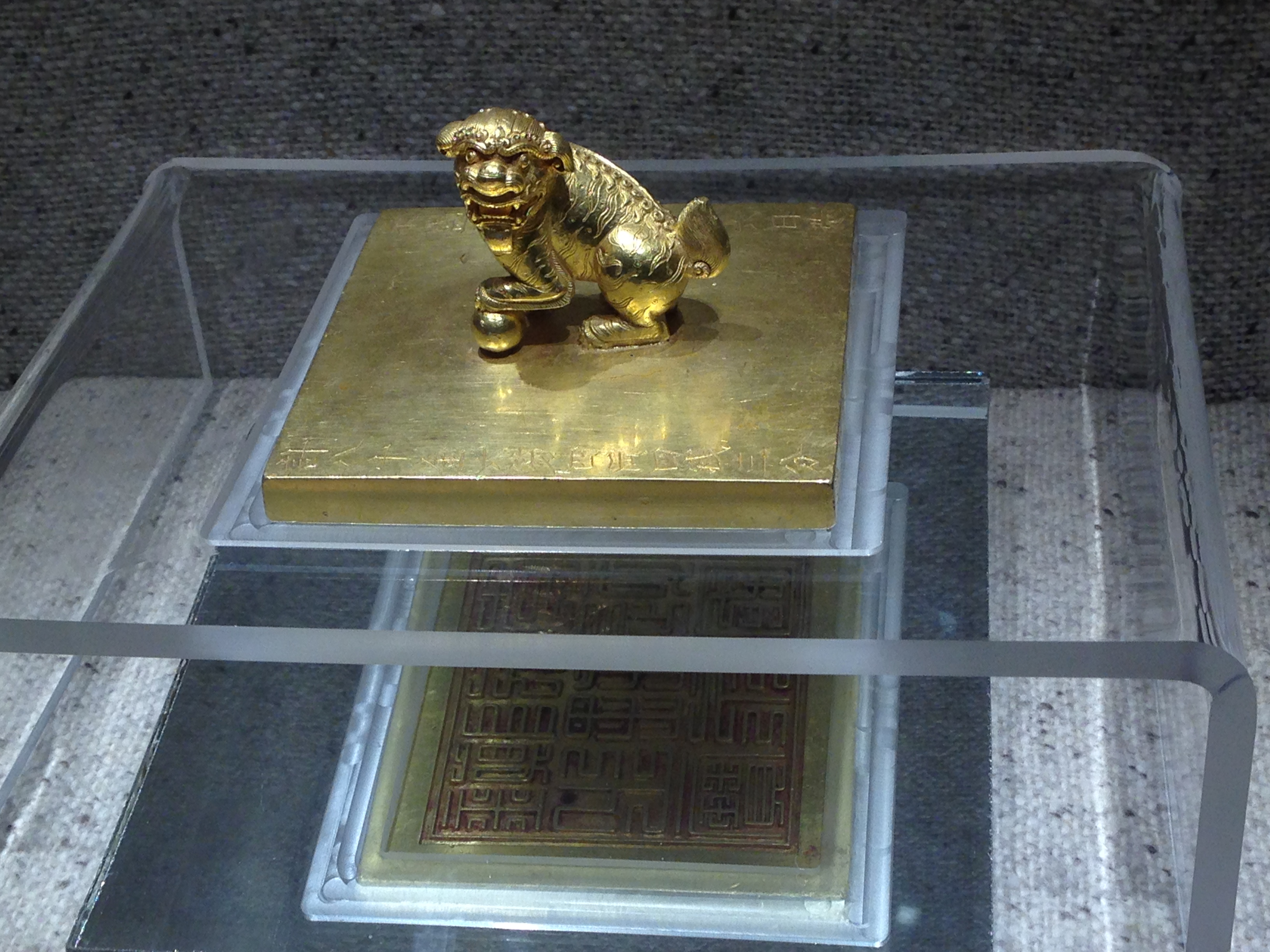
Courtesy seal of Nguyễn lord, gift of emperor Lê Hy Tông, dated 1709, inscribed with Chinese characters meaning Đại Việt quốc Nguyễn chúa vĩnh trấn chi bảo

The term "Việt" (Yue) (Chinese: 越; pinyin: Yuè; Cantonese Yale: Yuht; Wade–Giles: Yüeh^{4}; Vietnamese: Việt) in Early Middle Chinese was first written using the logograph "戉" for an axe (a homophone), in oracle bone and bronze inscriptions of the late Shang dynasty (c. 1200 BC), and later as "越". At that time it referred to a people or chieftain to the northwest of the Shang. In the early 8th century BC, a tribe on the middle Yangtze were called the Yangyue, a term later used for peoples further south. Between the 7th and 4th centuries BC Yue/Việt referred to the State of Yue in the lower Yangtze basin and its people.

From the 3rd century BC the term was used for the non-Chinese populations of south and southwest China and northern Vietnam, with particular states or groups called Minyue, Ouyue (Vietnamese: Âu Việt), Luoyue (Vietnamese: Lạc Việt), etc., collectively called the Baiyue (Bách Việt, Chinese: 百越; pinyin: Bǎiyuè; Cantonese Yale: Baak Yuet; Vietnamese: Bách Việt; lit. 'Hundred Yue/Viet'; ). The term Baiyue/Bách Việt first appeared in the book Lüshi Chunqiu compiled around 239 BC.

According to Ye Wenxian (1990), apud Wan (2013), the ethnonym of the Yuefang in northwestern China is not associated with that of the Baiyue in southeastern China.

In 207 BC, former Qin dynasty general Zhao Tuo/Triệu Đà founded the kingdom of Nanyue/Nam Việt (Chinese: 南越; lit. 'Southern Yue/Việt') with its capital at Panyu (modern Guangzhou). This kingdom was "southern" in the sense that it was located south of other Baiyue kingdoms such as Minyue and Ouyue, located in modern Fujian and Zhejiang. Several later Vietnamese dynasties followed this nomenclature even after these more northern peoples were absorbed into China.

In 968, the Vietnamese leader Đinh Bộ Lĩnh established the independent kingdom of Đại Cồ Việt (大瞿越) (possibly meaning "Great Gautama's Viet", as Gautama's Chữ Hán transcription 瞿曇 is pronounced Cồ Đàm in Sino-Vietnamese); over the former Jinghai state. In 1054, Emperor Lý Thánh Tông shortened the country's name to Đại Việt ("Great Viet"). However, the names Giao Chỉ and An Nam were still the widely known names that foreigners used to refer the state of Đại Việt during medieval and early modern periods,. For examples, Caugigu (Italian); Kafjih-Guh (Arabic: كوة ك); Koci (Malay); Cauchy (Portuguese); Cochinchina (English); Annam (Dutch, Portuguese, Spanish and French). In 1787, US politician Thomas Jefferson referred to Vietnam as Cochinchina for the purpose of trading for rice.

"Sấm Trạng Trình" (The Prophecies of Principal Graduate Trình), which are attributed to Vietnamese official and poet Nguyễn Bỉnh Khiêm (1491–1585), reversed the traditional order of the syllables and put the name in its modern form "Việt Nam" as in Việt Nam khởi tổ xây nền "Vietnam's founding ancestor lays its basis" or Việt Nam khởi tổ gây nên "Vietnam's founding ancestor builds it up". At this time, the country was divided between the Trịnh lords of Đông Kinh and the Nguyễn lords of Thừa Thiên. By combining several existing names, Nam Việt, Annam (Pacified South), Đại Việt (Great Việt), and "Nam quốc" (southern nation), the oracles' author[s] created a new name that referred to an aspirational unified state. The word "Nam" no longer implies Southern Việt, but rather that Vietnam is "the South" in contrast to China, "the North". This sentiment had already been in the poem "Nam quốc sơn hà" (1077)'s first line: 南國山河南帝居 Nam quốc sơn hà Nam đế cư "The Southern country's mountains and rivers the Southern Emperor inhabits". Researcher Nguyễn Phúc Giác Hải found the word 越南 "Việt Nam" on 12 steles carved in the 16th and 17th centuries, including one at Bảo Lâm Pagoda, Haiphong (1558). Lord Nguyễn Phúc Chu (1675–1725), when describing Hải Vân Pass (then called Ải Lĩnh, lit. "Mountain-Pass's Saddle-Point"), apparently used "Việt Nam" as a national name in his poem's first line Việt Nam ải hiểm thử sơn điên, (Note: Another translation: This mountain pass is the most dangerous in the south(ern part) of Việt) which was translated as Núi này ải hiểm đất Việt Nam "This mountain's pass is the most dangerous in Vietnam". Việt Nam was used as an official national name by Emperor Gia Long in 1804–1813. The Vietnamese asked permission from the Qing dynasty to change the name of their country. Originally, Gia Long had wanted the name Nam Việt and asked for his country to be recognized as such, but the Jiaqing Emperor refused since the ancient state of the same name had ruled territory that was part of the Qing dynasty. The Jiaqing Emperor refused Gia Long's request to change his country's name to Nam Việt, and changed the name instead to Việt Nam in 1804. Gia Long's Đại Nam thực lục contains the diplomatic correspondence over the naming.

In his account about the meeting with Vietnamese officials in Hue on January 17, 1832, Edmund Roberts, American embassy in Vietnam, wrote :

"...The country, they said, is not now called Annam, as formerly, but Wietnam (Vietnam), and it is ruled, not by a king, but by an emperor,..."

— Edmund Roberts

"Trung Quốc" 中國, (literally "Middle Country" or "Central Country"), was also used as a name for Vietnam by Gia Long in 1805. Minh Mạng used the name "Trung Quốc" 中國 to call Vietnam. Vietnamese Nguyen Emperor Minh Mạng sinicized ethnic minorities such as Cambodians, claimed the legacy of Confucianism and China's Han dynasty for Vietnam, and used the term Han people 漢人 to refer to the Vietnamese. Minh Mang declared that "We must hope that their barbarian habits will be subconsciously dissipated, and that they will daily become more infected by Han [Sino-Vietnamese] customs." This policies were directed at the Khmer and hill tribes. The Nguyen lord Nguyen Phuc Chu had referred to Vietnamese as "Han people" in 1712 when differentiating between Vietnamese and Chams; meanwhile, ethnic Chinese were referred to as Thanh nhân 清人 or Đường nhân 唐人.

The use of "Vietnam" was revived in modern times by nationalists including Phan Bội Châu, whose book Việt Nam vong quốc sử (History of the Loss of Vietnam) was published in 1906. Chau also founded the Việt Nam Quang Phục Hội (Vietnam Restoration League) in 1912. However, the general public continued to use Annam and the name "Vietnam" remained virtually unknown until the Yên Bái mutiny of 1930, organized by the Việt Nam Quốc Dân Đảng (Vietnamese Nationalist Party). By the early 1940s, the use of "Việt Nam" was widespread. It appeared in the name of Ho Chi Minh's Việt Nam Độc lập Đồng minh Hội (Viet Minh), founded 1941, and was even used by the governor of French Indochina in 1942. The name "Vietnam" has been official since 1945. It was adopted in June by Bảo Đại's imperial government in Huế, and in September by Ho's rival communist government in Hanoi.

=== Other names ===
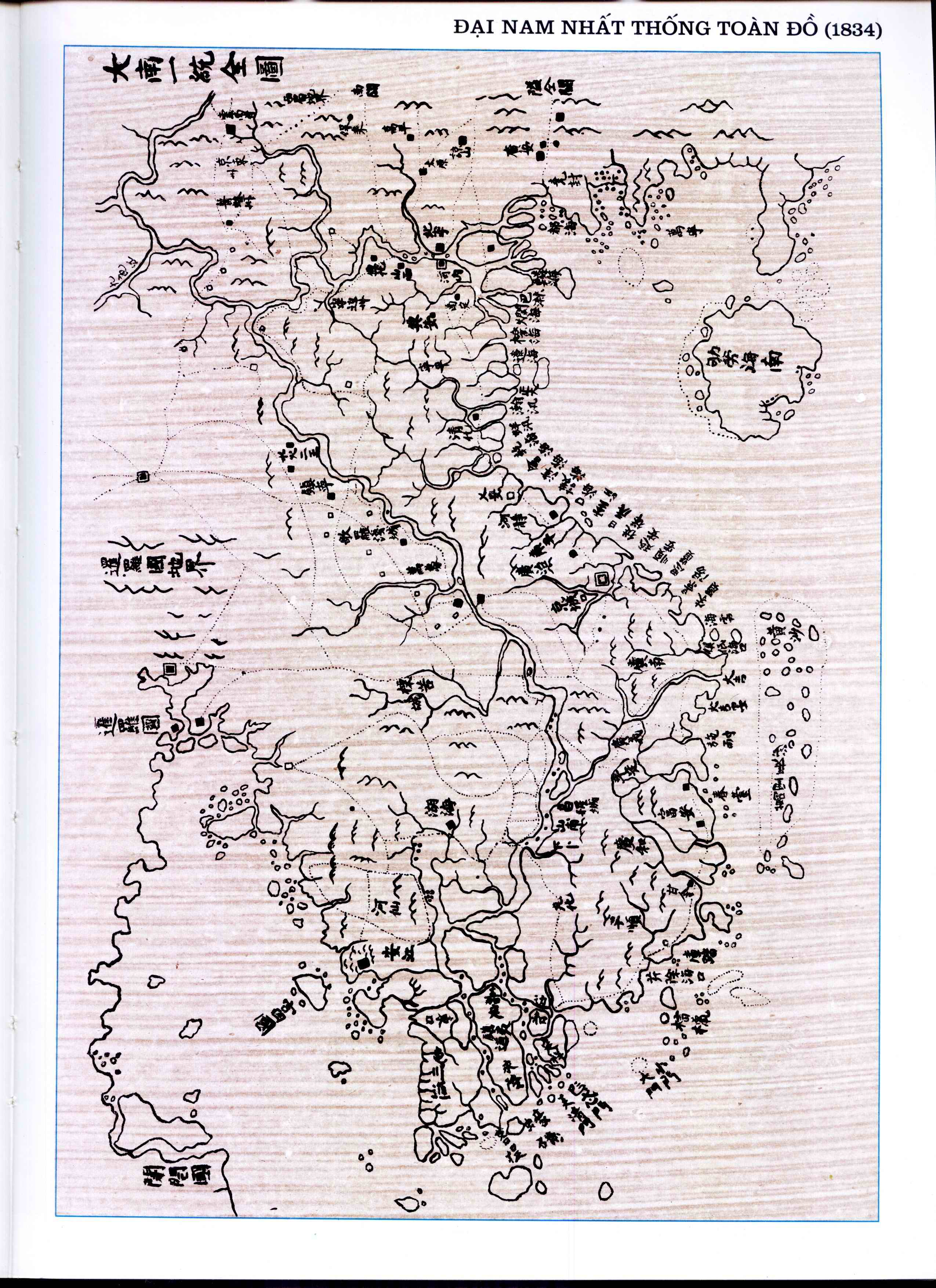
Đại Nam nhất thống toàn đồ (大南ー統全圖 "Comprehensive Map of United Đại Nam") by Nguyễn dynasty in 1838.

Official names pre-1945

Time	Name	Polity
2879 – 2524 BC	Xích Quỷ 赤鬼	Hồng Bàng dynasty – Kinh Dương Vương
7th century – 258 BC	Văn Lang 文郎,	Hồng Bàng dynasty – Hùng king
257 – 207 BC	Âu Lạc 甌駱, 甌貉	Thục dynasty – An Dương Vương
204 BC – 111 BC	Nam Việt [quốc] 南越	Triệu dynasty
111 BC - 40 (Note: The national name under Trưng sisters' rule from 40 - 43 CE is not recorded); 43 - 203; 1407 - 1427	Giao Chỉ [quận] 交址, 交阯, 交趾	Chinese domination
203 – 544; 602 – 679	Giao châu 交州	Chinese domination
544–602	Vạn Xuân [quốc] 萬春	Anterior Lý dynasty
679 – 757; 766 – 866	Annam [phủ] 安南	Chinese domination
757–766	Trấn Nam [phủ] 鎮南	Chinese domination
866–968	Tĩnh Hải [quân] 靜海	Chinese domination Ngô dynasty Anarchy of the 12 Warlords
968–1054	Đại Cồ Việt [quốc] 大瞿越	Đinh dynasty Early Lê dynasty Lý dynasty
1054 – 1400; 1428 – 1804	Đại Việt [quốc] 大越	Lý dynasty Trần dynasty Hồ dynasty Lê dynasty Mạc dynasty Tây Sơn dynasty Nguyễn dynasty
1400–1407	Đại Ngu [quốc] 大虞	Hồ dynasty
1804–1839	Việt Nam [quốc] 越南	Nguyễn dynasty
1839–1945	Đại Nam [quốc] 大南	Nguyễn dynasty

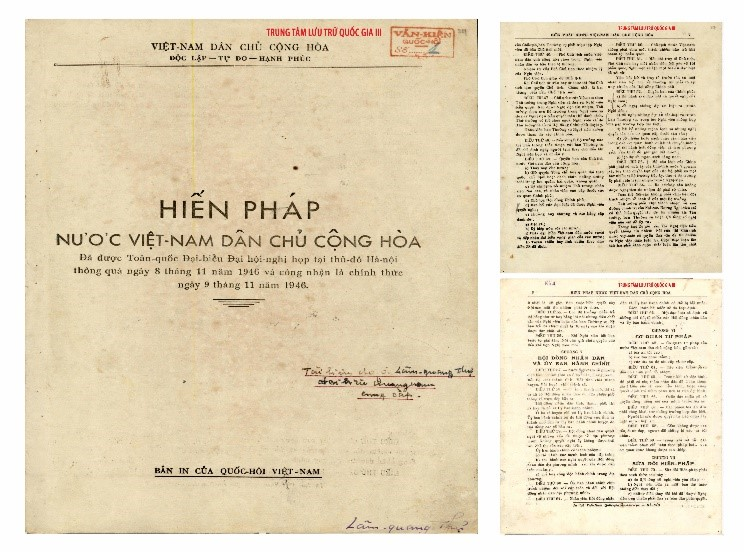
The 1946 Constitution of the Democratic Republic of Vietnam with the country's then-designation.

Official names since 1945: "Việt Nam"

- Đế quốc Việt Nam (Empire of Vietnam): 11 March – 25 August 1945.
- Việt Nam Dân chủ Cộng hòa (Democratic Republic of Vietnam): 2 September 1945 – 18 February 1947, 10 October 1954 – 2 July 1976.
- Quốc gia Việt Nam (State of Vietnam): 27 May 1948 – 26 October 1955.
- Việt Nam Cộng hòa (Republic of Vietnam): 26 October 1955 – 30 April 1975.
- Cộng hòa Xã hội chủ nghĩa Việt Nam (Socialist Republic of Vietnam): 2 July 1976 to now.

Non-official names

- Việt Thường (越裳, 越裳國, 越裳氏): Initially, the name of a clan and/or nation to the south of Jiaozhi. (Note: According to Vietnamese historian Đào Duy Anh, this location named Jiaozhi in the classical texts was located no farther than modern Anhui province, China, i.e. not the same place as the Jiaozhi commandery established in the Red River Delta during the Han dynasty.)Đại Việt sử ký toàn thư claimed that this was Vietnamese's endonym when first presenting gifts to King Cheng of Zhou (Note: ĐVSKTT asserted that An Dương Vương built Cổ Loa in Việt Thường. Cổ Loa citadel's supposed ruins are now in Đông Anh District, Hanoi, Vietnam. Meanwhile, Sinologist Alfred Forke located the "people" 越裳 Yüeh-shang "in the southern part of Kuang-tung province, near the Annamese frontier", not inside modern Vietnam)
- Lĩnh Ngoại (嶺外): lit. "Beyond the Ranges" or "Outer Ranges" (i.e. Nanling Mountains). Used interchangeably with Lĩnh Nam (嶺南; pinyin: Lǐngnán; lit. "South of the Ranges"). Included Guangdong, Guangxi, Hainan, Hong Kong, and Macau, as well as modern northern Vietnam.
- Thiên Nam (天南): Lit. "Sky South". Mainly found in Vietnamese literature, such examples include the book, Thiên Nam ngữ lục ngoại kỷ (天南語錄外紀) and Thiên Nam tứ tự kinh (天南四字經).
- Giao Chỉ quận (交趾郡): Lit. "Jiaozhi Commandery". Chinese name for Đại Cồ Việt & Đại Việt
- An Nam quốc (安南國): Lit. "Pacificed South state". Chinese name for Đại Việt. The basis for various foreign exonyms for Vietnam.
- Nam Việt quốc (南越國): Lit. "South Viet state". Proposed by Nguyễn emperor Gia Long but rejected by Qing Emperor Jiaqing.
- Đại Nam Đế quốc (大南帝國) (1839 – 1945): Lit. "Great South state". Diplomatic name.
- Empire d'Annam: French exonoym.
- Union indochinoise (1887–1945), Fédération indochinoise (1947–1953) or Liên bang Đông Dương (東洋聯邦): designations for the Indochinese Union.
- Đại Hùng Đế quốc (大雄帝國, 30 August 1917 – 11 January 1918): Lit. "Great Heroic Empire". Only during the Thái Nguyên uprising.
- Việt Nam Dân quốc (越南民國, 1929? – 1930): Lit. "Vietnam People state" or "Republic of Vietnam". Only during the Yên Bái mutiny. Equivalent to the Republic of China and later the Republic of Korea in Sino-Xenic vocabularies, but not the established Republic of Vietnam (which was designated under a different vocabulary).
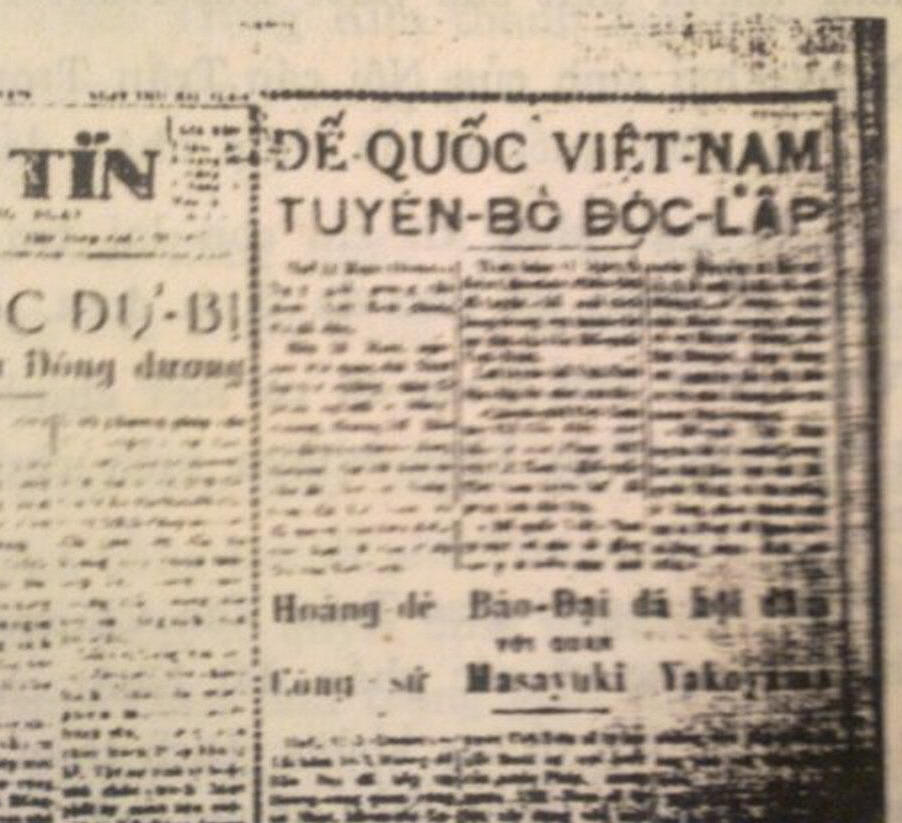
Telegram Dailynews has reported the "Empire of Vietnam declared independence", 11 March 1945.

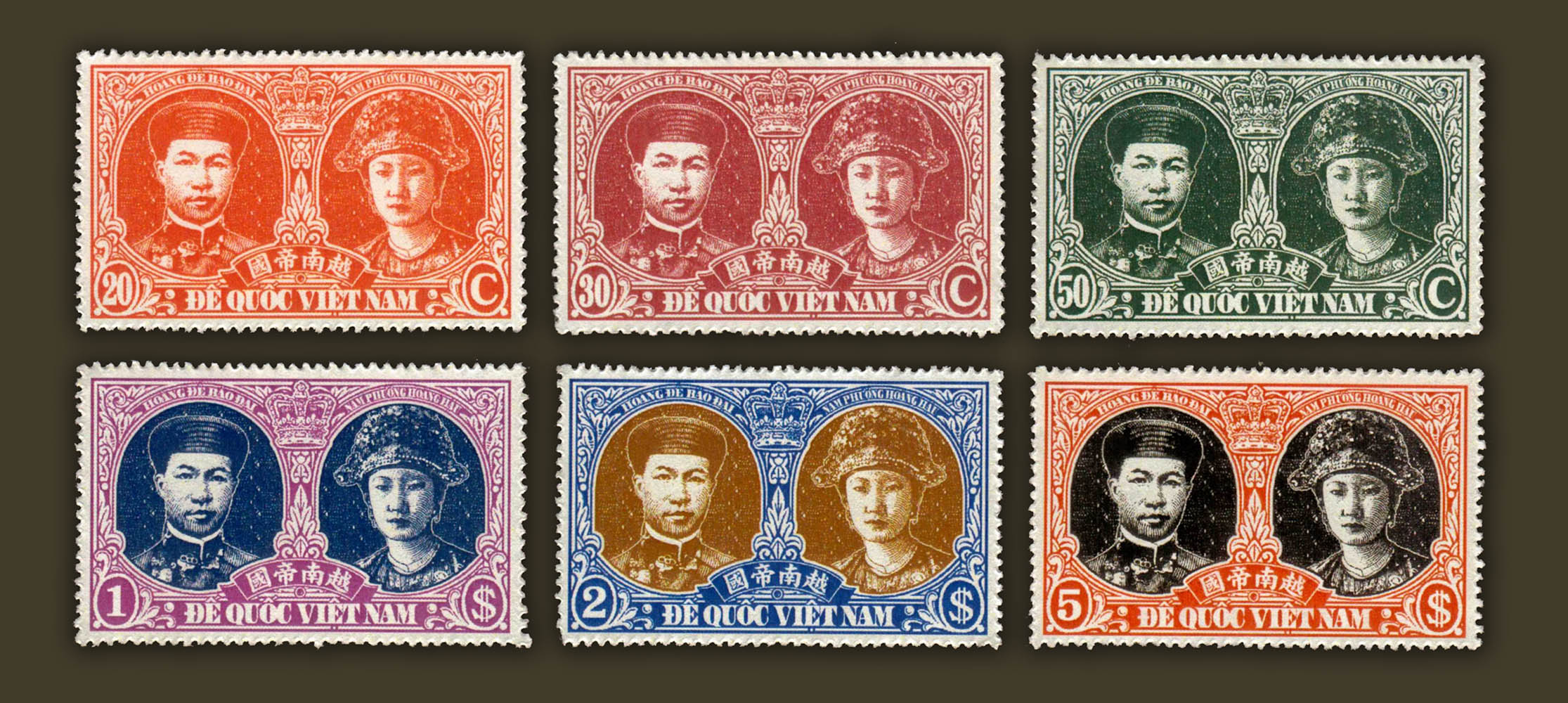
Stamps of the Empire of Vietnam.

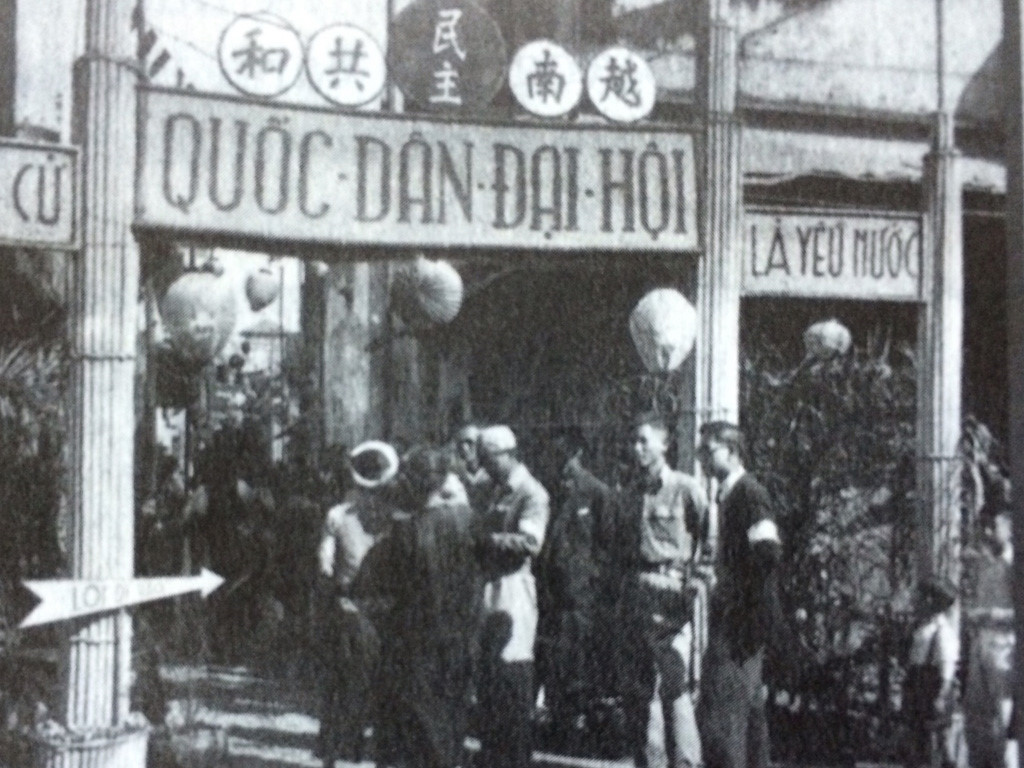
Preparing of the National Assembly elections, Phất Lộc lane, Hanoi 1946.

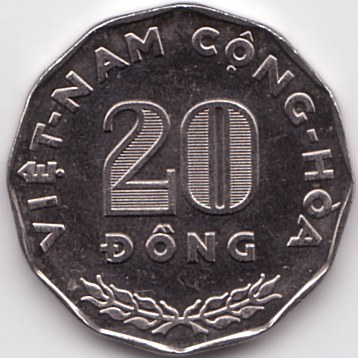
Coin of the Republic of Vietnam in 1960.

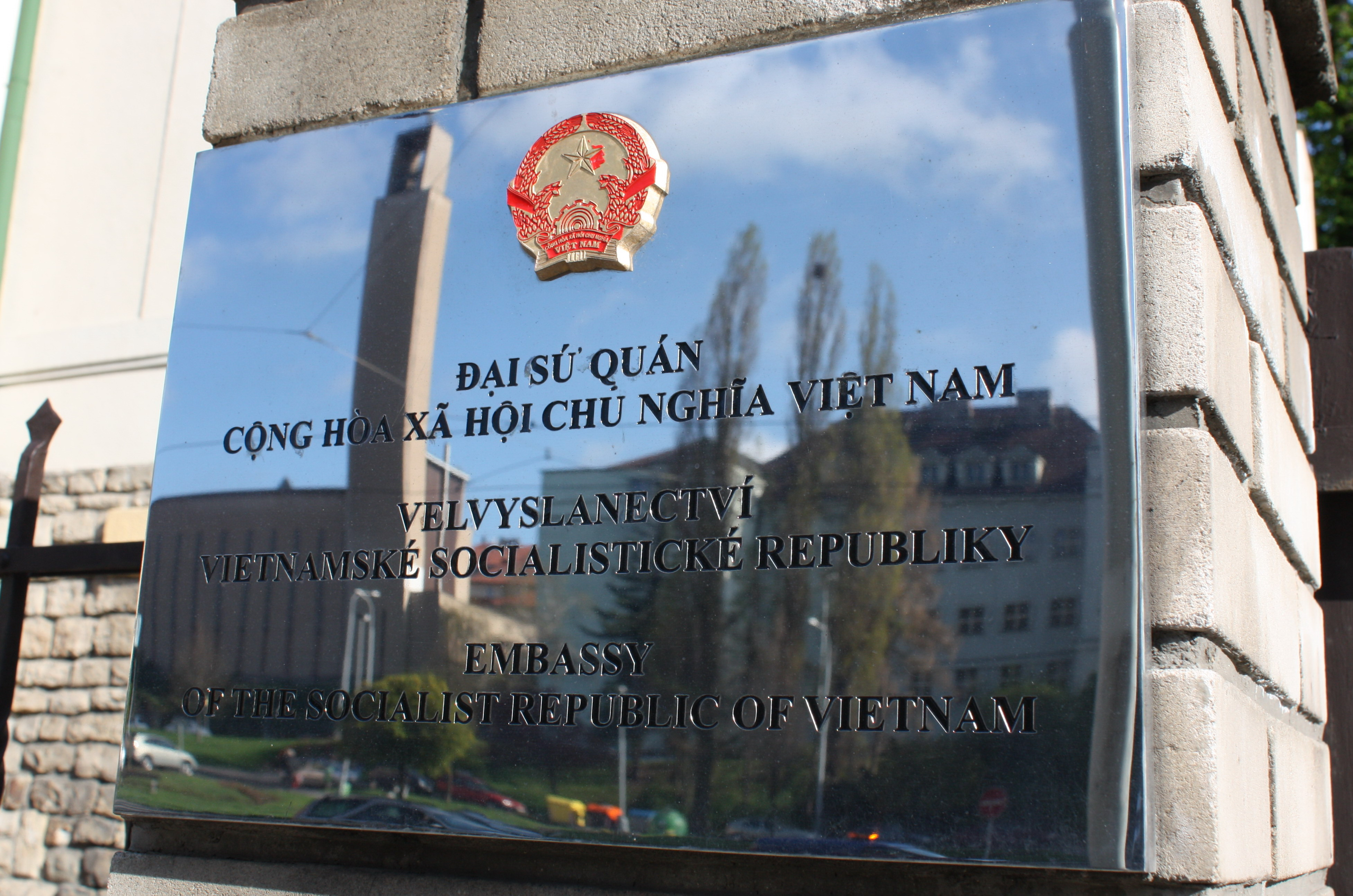
Vietnamese Embassy in Prague on 25 April 2012.

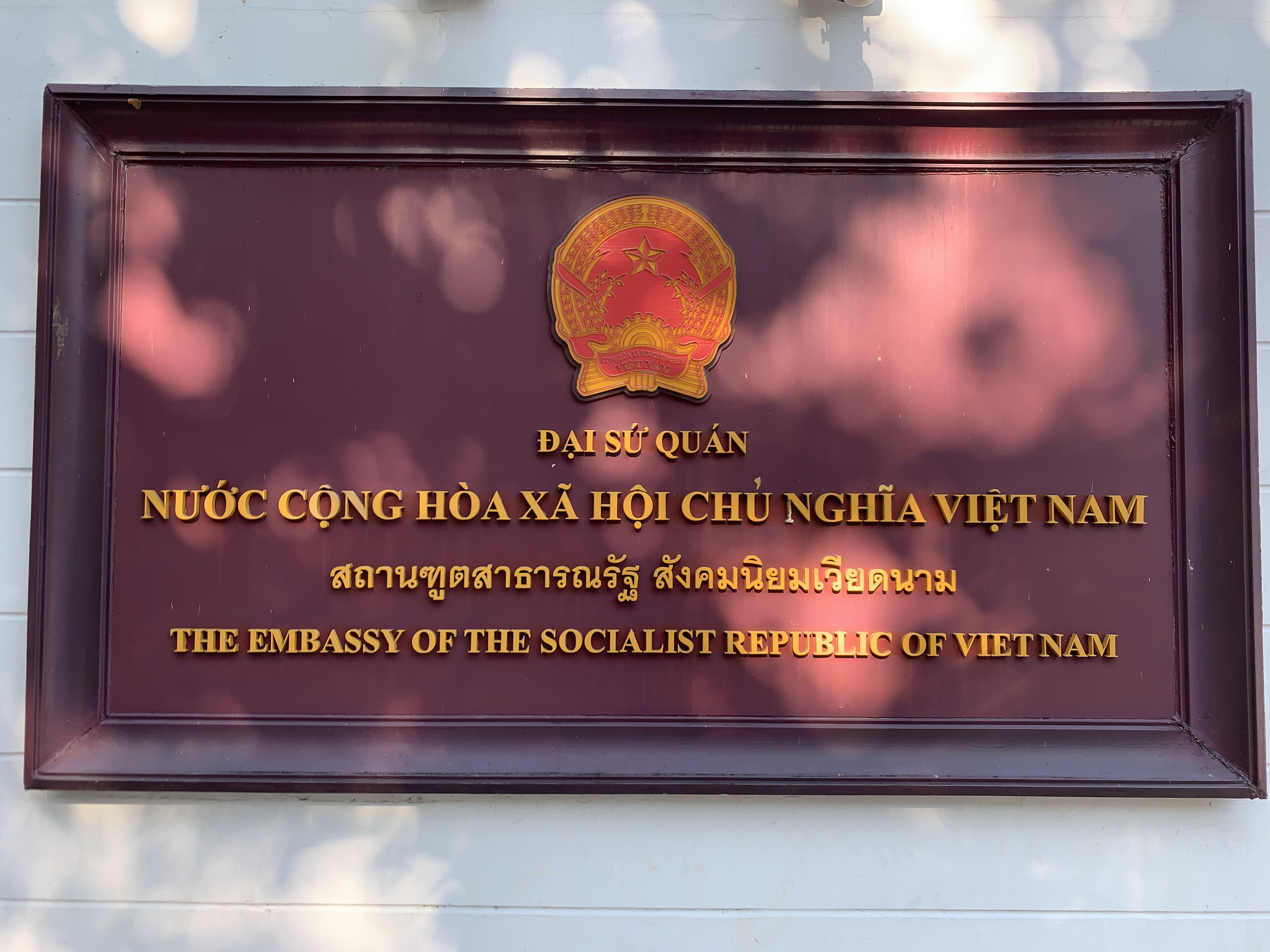
Vietnamese Embassy in Bangkok, Thailand as of 2021.

== Other spellings ==
In English, the spellings Vietnam, Viet-Nam, Viet Nam and Việt Nam have all been used. Josiah Conder in his 1824 descriptive gazetteer The Modern Traveller: Birmah, Siam, and Anam (Burma, Siam, and Annam) spells Viet-nam with a hyphen placed between Viet and Nam. The 1954 edition of Webster's New Collegiate Dictionary gave both the unspaced and hyphenated forms; in response to a letter from a reader, the editors indicated that the spaced form Viet Nam was also acceptable, though they stated that because Anglophones did not know the meaning of the two words making up the name Vietnam, "it is not surprising" that there was a tendency to drop the space. In 1966, the U.S. government was known to use all three renderings, with the State Department preferring the hyphenated version. By 1981, the hyphenated form was regarded as "dated", according to Scottish writer Gilbert Adair, and he titled his book about depictions of the country in film using the unhyphenated and unspaced form "Vietnam". Nowadays, the federal government of the United States and its affiliated entities mainly use "Vietnam" as the primary designation for the country.

Currently "Vietnam" is most commonly used as the official name in English, leading to the adjective Vietnamese (instead of Viet, Vietic or Viet Namese) and 3-letter code VIE in IOC and FIFA (instead of VNM). In all other languages mainly written in Latin script, the name of Vietnam is also commonly written without a space. The spelling that separated by a space as "Viet Nam" is formally recognized by the International Organization for Standardization (ISO), the United Nations (UN) and the Vietnamese Government itself as the official, standardized and "accurate" country name, resulting in the systematic prioritization in the usage of this spelling by the Vietnamese state-powered agencies and official documents such as the nationwide-issued identity cards and the passports.

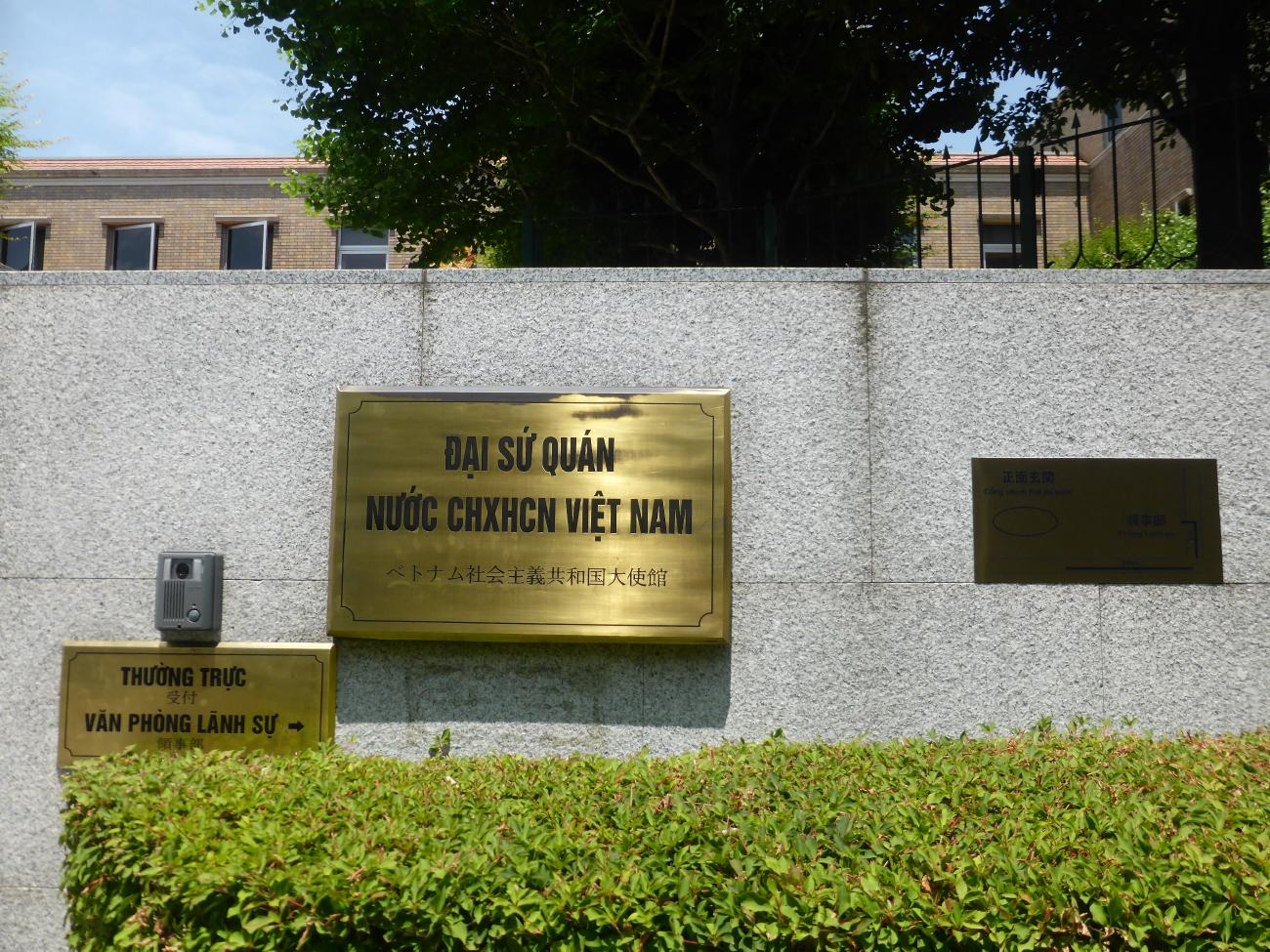
Plaque of the Vietnamese Embassy in Tokyo, Japan, with Vietnam's formal designation being inscribed in Japanese writing system.

Both Japanese and Korean formerly referred to Vietnam by their respective Sino-Xenic pronunciations of the Chinese characters for its names, but later switched to using direct phonetic transcriptions. In Japanese, following the independence of Vietnam, the names Annan (安南) and Etsunan (越南) were largely replaced by the phonetic transcription Betonamu (ベトナム), written in katakana script; however, the old form is still seen in compound words (e.g. 訪越, "a visit to Vietnam"). Japan's Ministry of Foreign Affairs sometimes used an alternative spelling Vietonamu (ヴィエトナム). Similarly, in the Korean language, in line with the trend towards decreasing usage of Hanja, the Sino-Korean-derived name Wollam (월남, the Korean reading of 越南) has been replaced by Beteunam (베트남) in South Korea and Wennam (윁남) in North Korea.

== See also ==
- Tonkin, a historical exonym for north Vietnam
- Cochinchina, a historical exonym for south Vietnam
- French Indochina, a name given to a grouping of three regions of Vietnam (Tonkin, Annam, and Cochinchine), along with Cambodia and Laos, as French colonial territories.
- Place names of Vietnam
- Little China (ideology)

By ISO 639-3 code
Enter an ISO code to find the corresponding language article.
