= Nguyễn Bỉnh Khiêm =

Vietnamese administrator and Cao Dai saint

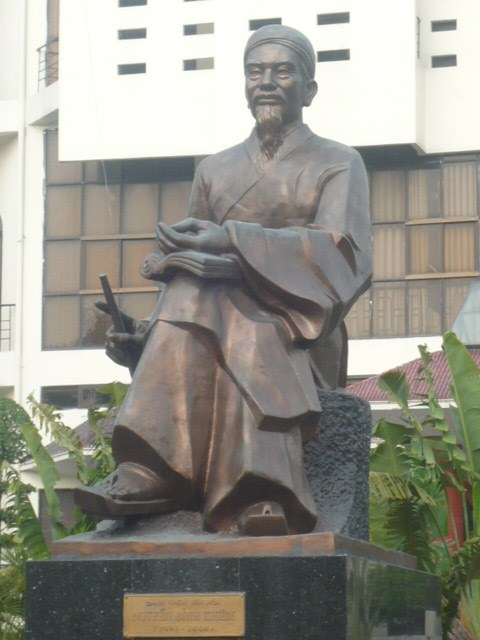
- Statue of Nguyễn Bỉnh Khiêm
- Born: 1491; Cổ Am (now Haiphong)
- Died: 1585 (age 93)
- Other names: Nguyễn Văn Đạt; Hanh Phủ (亨甫); Bạch Vân cư sĩ (白雲居士, White Cloud Hermit); Trạng Trình (狀程)
- Occupations: Magistrate, poet, educator
- Known for: Khiem's oracular poetry has been compared to that of Nostradamus. It contains the earliest known use of the word "Vietnam."

Nguyễn Bỉnh Khiêm (chữ Hán: 阮秉謙; 1491–1585) was a Vietnamese administrator, confucianist, poet, prophet and later a saint of the Cao Dai religion and of the new religious movement known as School of Teaching Goodness.

== Biography ==
Born on the coast in Cổ Am village (which is now part of Hai Phong). As an adult, he studied knowledge from the second-rank doctor Lương Đắc Bằng and passed the official government examination at the fairly late age of 44 in the exams of 1535. However, he passed the exam, ranking number one in the country. This was a period of great instability in Vietnam which may explain why he took the exam at such a late age. He served in the Mạc dynasty court for just seven years until 1542 when he resigned after his official complaints of government corruptions were ignored. He then returned to his native village and opened a school. Among his students were Phùng Khắc Khoan (diplomat), Lương Hữu Khánh, Nguyễn Dữ (author of Truyền kỳ mạn lục).

Khiêm became a person much sought after by many leaders during that time of upheaval, civil war, the Mạc collapse, and the rise of the Trịnh lords and Nguyễn lords. Both Trịnh Kiểm and Nguyễn Hoàng purportedly sought his advice in their pursuit of power. To the former, he gave the advice of being the real power behind the (restored) Lê dynasty. To the latter, he advised building a base of power in the undeveloped south. Both men followed these suggestions, resulting in a political and military division of Vietnam that would last for 200 years. As a result of this sage advice, Khiêm gained a reputation as someone who could foretell the future. Some of his prophecies were of a Delphic nature as they were ambiguous and could be read in several ways.

Khiêm was also a poet, composing many poems in Chinese and Nôm that have survived to this day. There is a long poem attributed to him called Sấm Trạng Trình (讖狀程, The Prophecies of Trạng Trình). (Trạng Trình is one of Khiêm's nicknames.)

This is the Vietnamese equivalent of the Nostradamus quatrains. It is suggestive, believed to predict future events, and very mysterious. This poem includes the line, "Vietnam is being created" (Vietnamese: Việt Nam khởi tổ xây nền), an early use of the word Vietnam.

Most cities in Vietnam have named major streets after him.

== Modern Cult in the School of Teaching Goodness ==
The School of Teaching Goodness emerged in the 1990s in the Vĩnh Bảo District, a rural area of the city of Hải Phòng. A local carpenter known simply as "Master Thu" claimed to have been visited at night by the spirit of Khiêm, who ordered him to build a shrine in his honor. Thu owned some land, where he built and inaugurated in 1996 a shrine he called Minh Đường Trung Tân (The School of Teaching Goodness). By 2016, it had attracted more than 10,000 visitors, and Thu had organized around the channeled messages of Khiêm a new religious movement with thousands of followers.

In 2016, a woman credited with spiritual powers who lived near the shrine claimed to have found Khiêm's coffin buried in her garden. State archeologists took the finding seriously and investigated it. The results were inconclusive, but the fame of the shrine grew as a result of the incident.

== Sources ==
- Ta Ngoc Lien Renowned Vietnamese Intellectuals: Nguyen Binh Khiem, The Gioi Publishers, 2004.
- Nguyễn Huyền Anh. Việt Nam Danh Nhân Từ Điển.
- Phạm Thế Ngữ. Việt Nam Văn Học Sử.
- Trần Trọng Kim. Việt Nam Sử Lược.
- Nguyễn Bỉnh Khiêm, The Bach Vân Am Quôc-Ngu Thi Tâp, Text in Latin script and chữ nôm script, translation in French, Bulletin de la Société des études indochinoises, Saigon, 1974, 312 P.
