= Ba Vì National Park =

National park in Vietnam

Ba Vi National Park
- IUCN category II (national park)
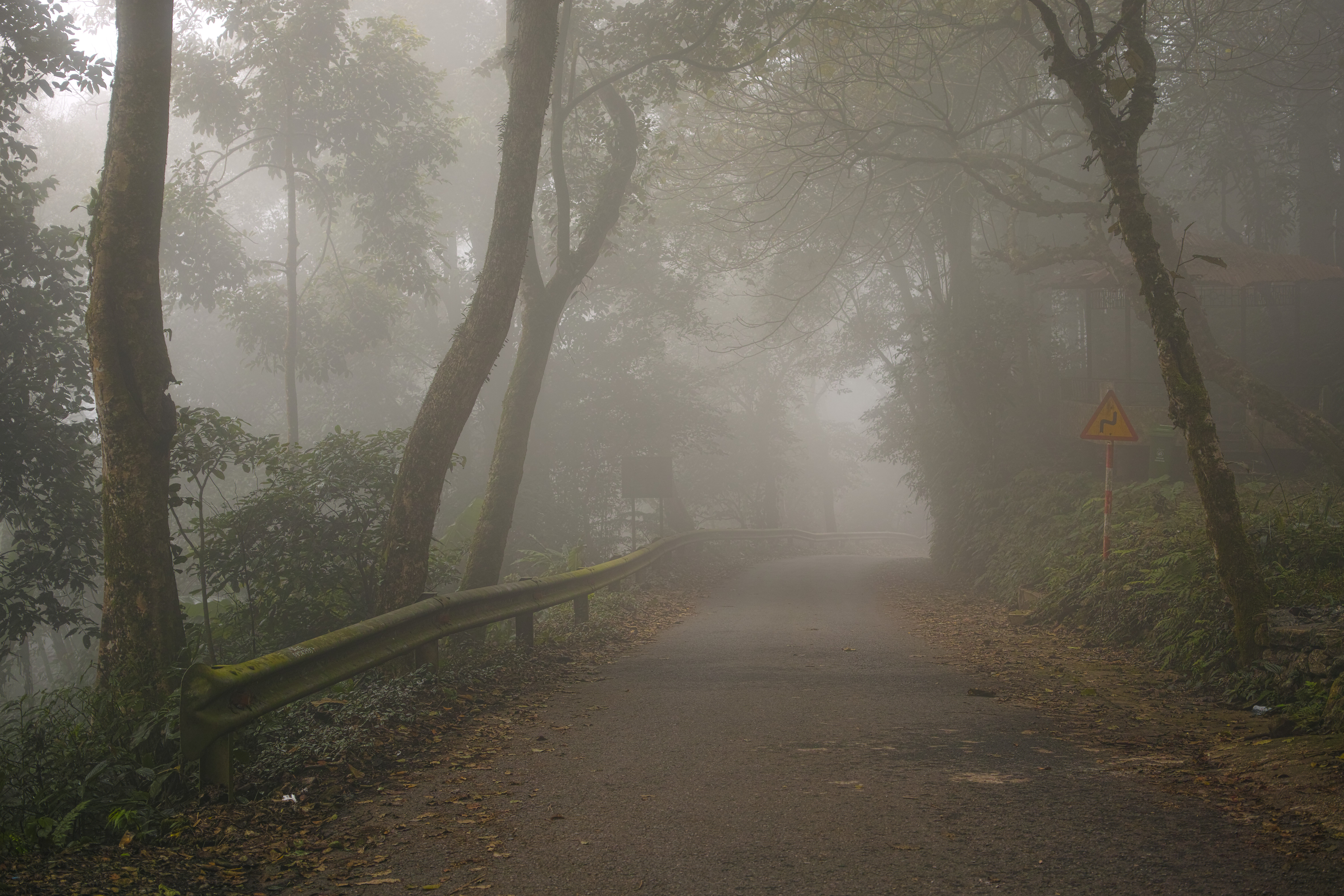

- Location within Vietnam
- Location: Ba Vi, Hanoi, Vietnam
- Nearest town: Sơn Tây
- Coordinates: 21°04′41″N 105°21′30″E
- Area: 10,815 ha (26,720 acres)
- Established: 1991

Ba Vì National Park (Vietnamese: Vườn quốc gia Ba Vì) is a national park located 48 km (30 mi) west of Hanoi, Vietnam. The park is located in the Ba Vì mountain range.

== Geography ==
Ba Vì National Park covers an area of 10,815 ha (26,720 acres) inside Ba Vì area of Hanoi, Lương Sơn area and the area of Hòa Bình, in the province of Phú Thọ. The national park is 15km west of the nearest ward, Sơn Tây and 48km western from the centre of Hanoi.

The Park is situated on the Ba Vì mountain range, running north-west and south-east with the highest peak being located on Vua mountain (lit. King Mountain) of 1,296 m. The park also features Tan Vien mountain with an altitude of 1,226 m and Ngoc Hoa mountain with 1,120 m.

Ba Vì National Park is the site of the remains of an ancient volcano, with the last eruption dated approximately 200 million years ago.

== Gallery ==
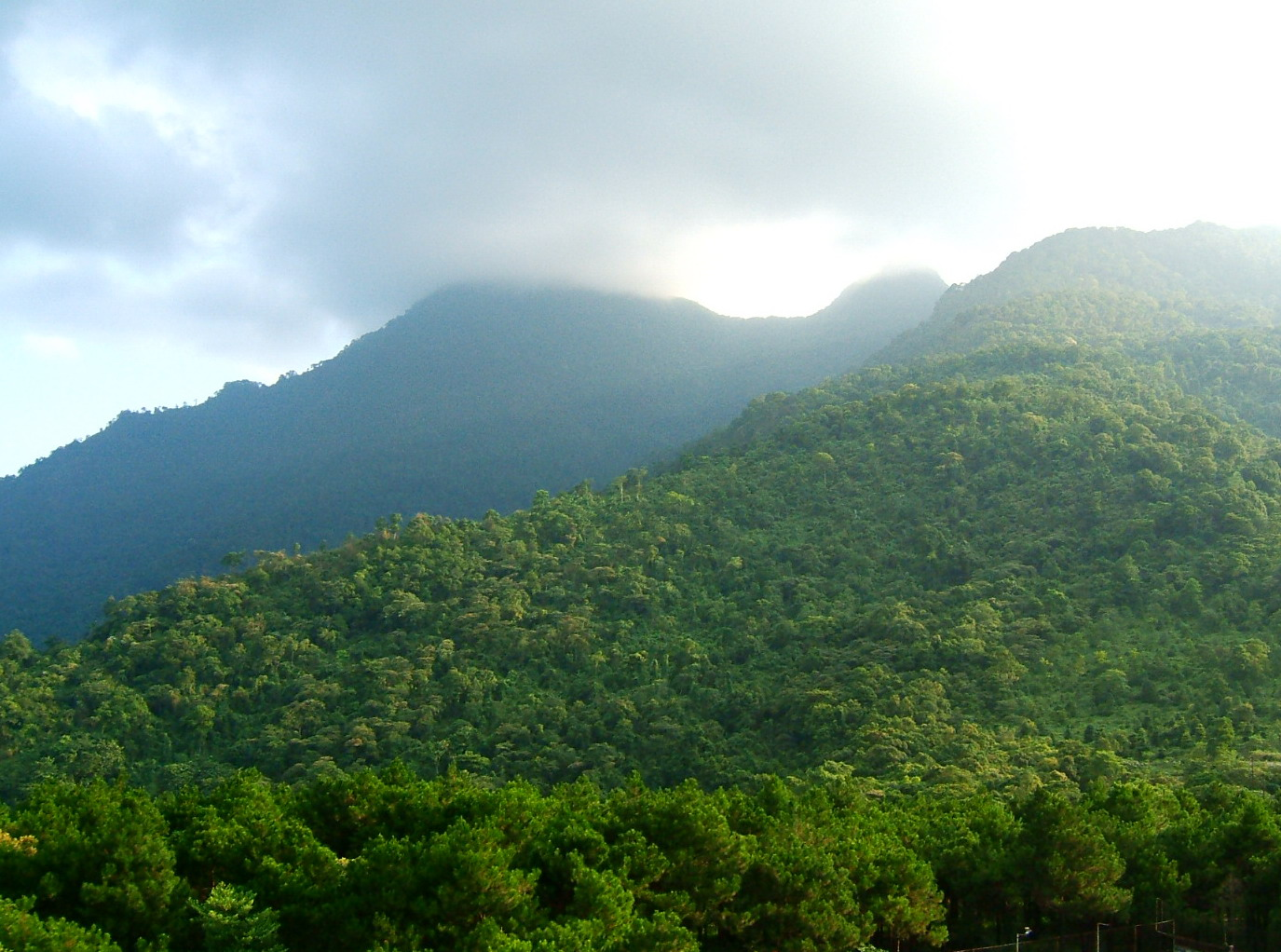
Ba Vi National Park

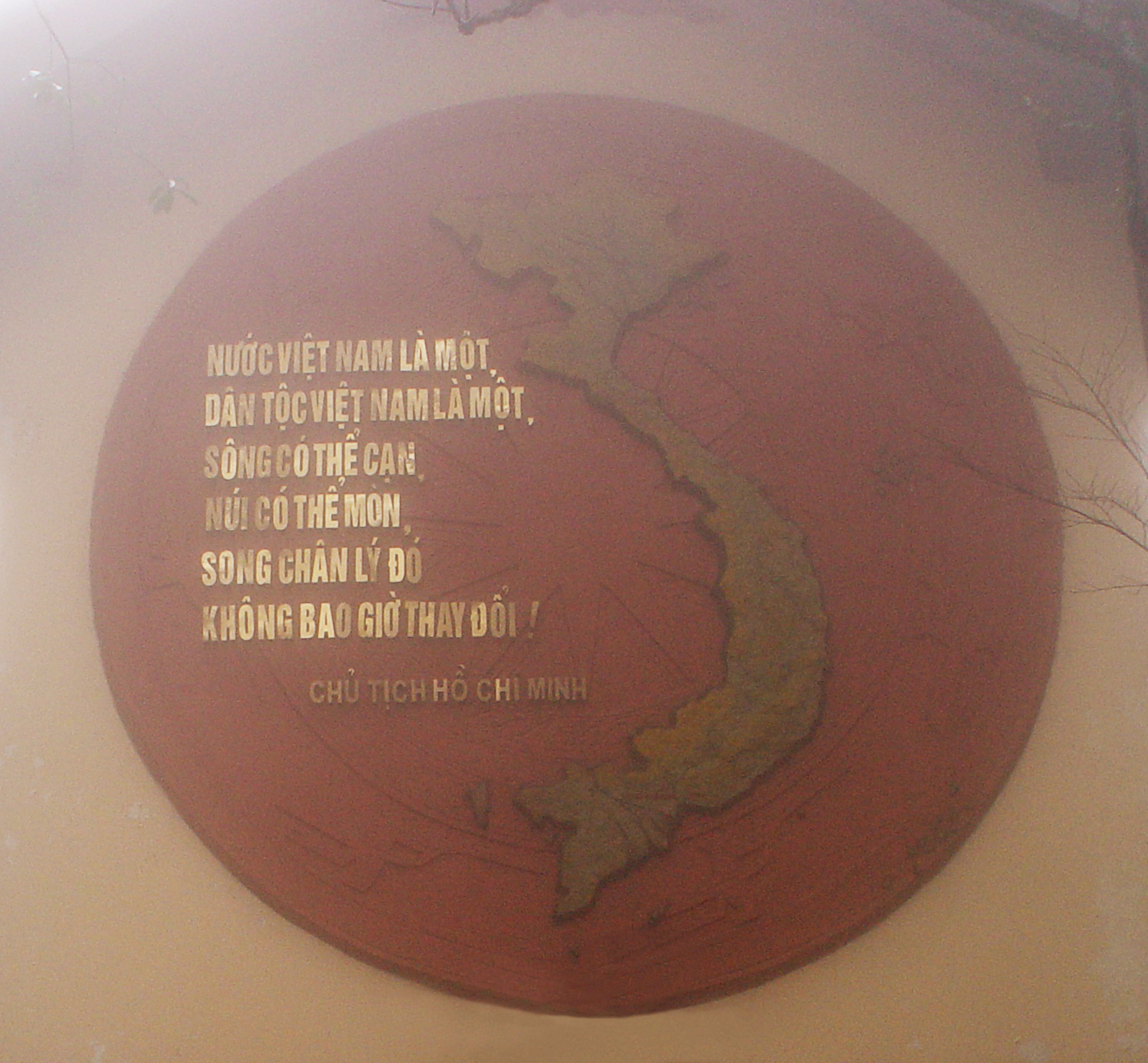
Ba Vì National Park, Entrance to Ho Chi Minh Temple on King High Peak, Vietnam

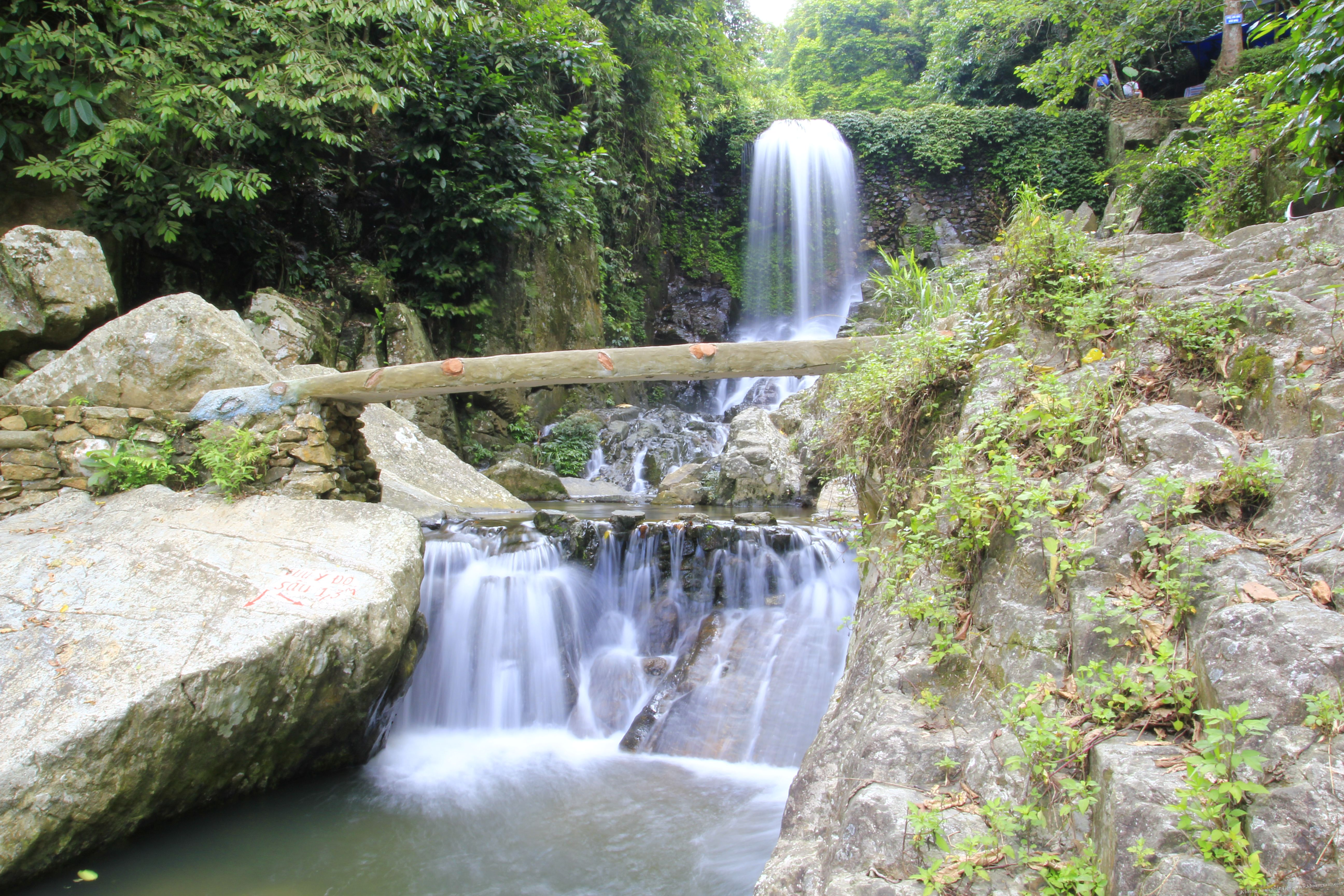
Ba Vi National Park

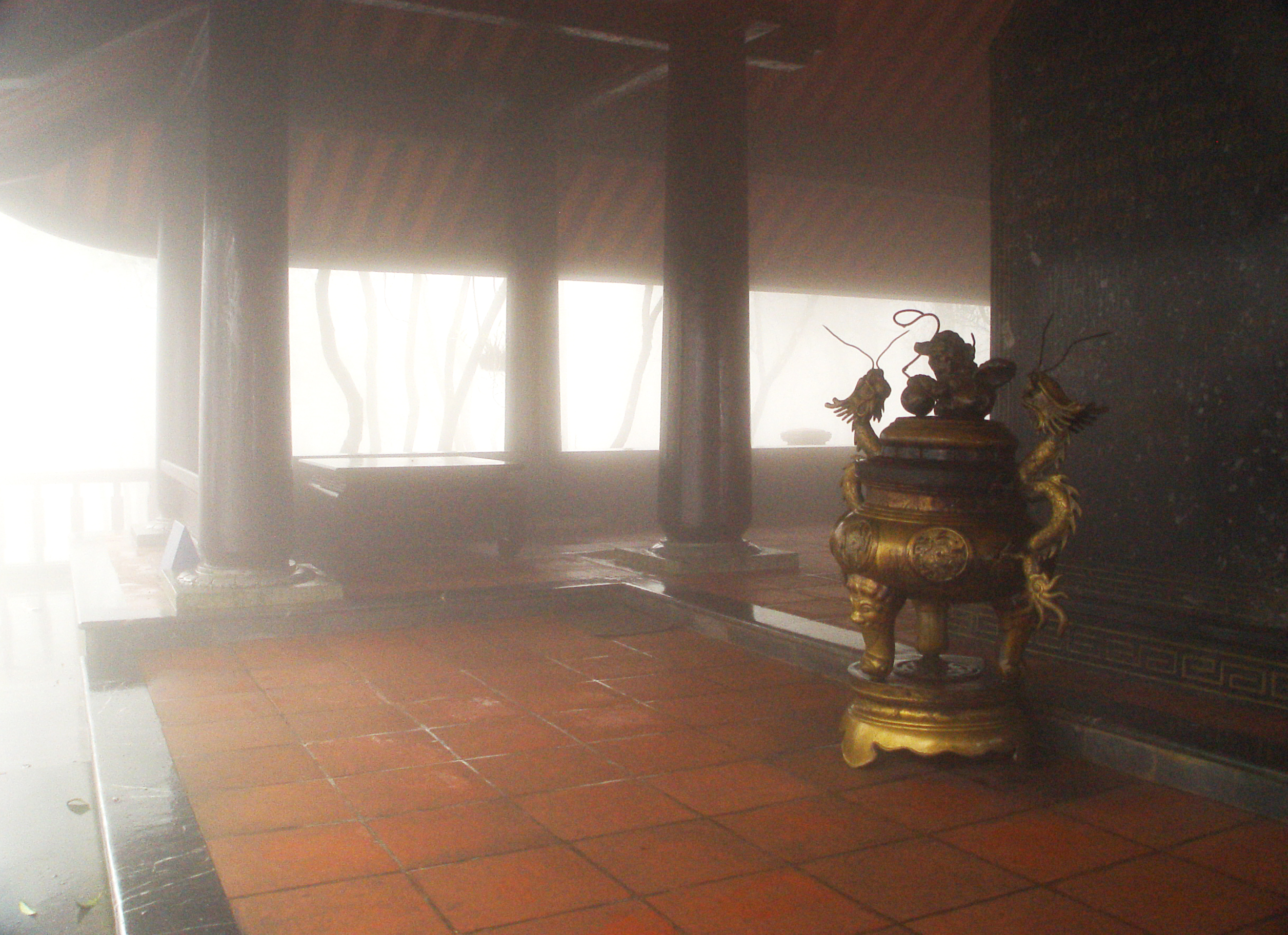
Ba Vì National Park, Inside the Ho Chi Minh Temple on King High Peak, Vietnam

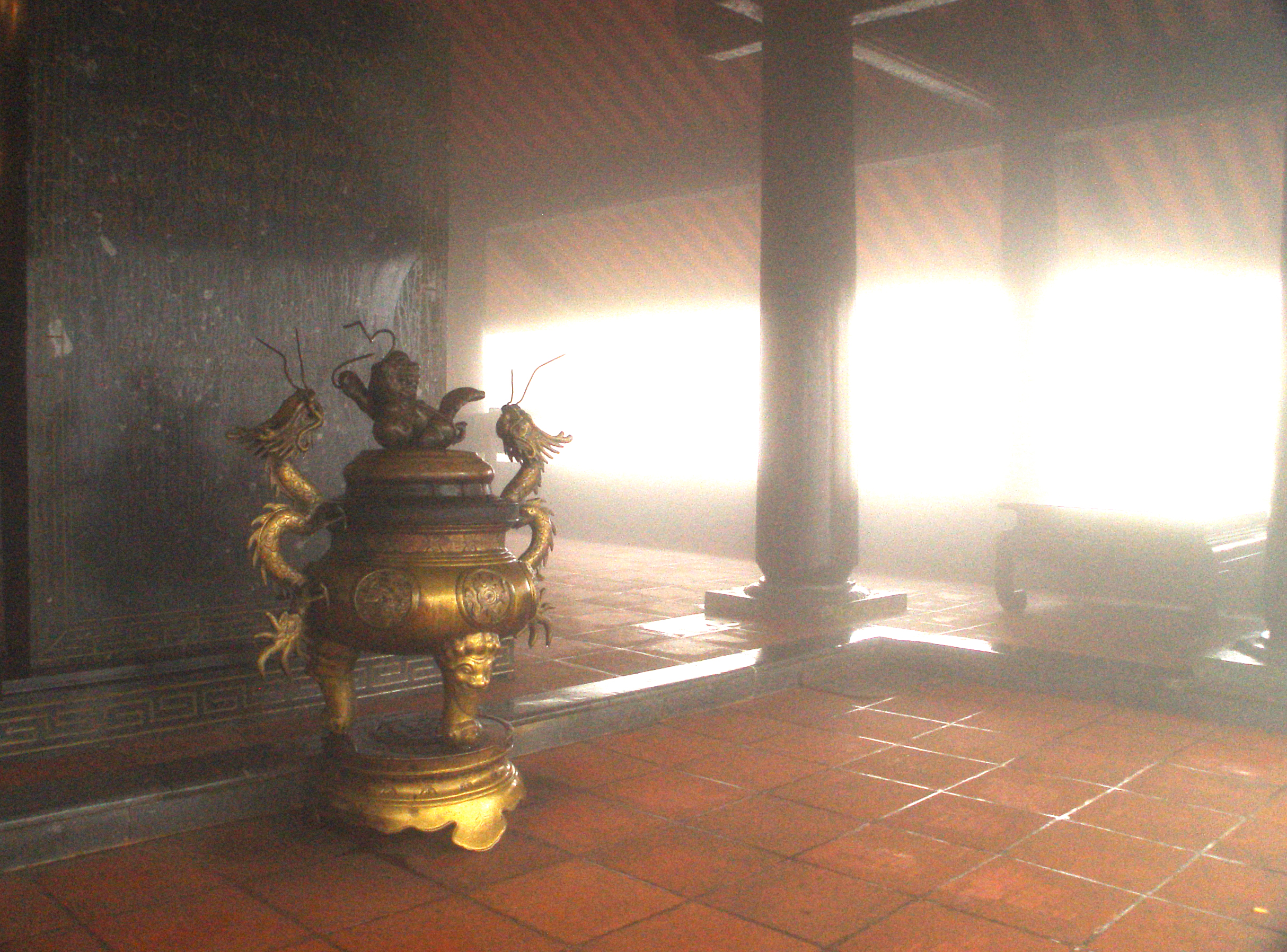
Ba Vì National Park, Inside the Ho Chi Minh Temple on King High Peak, Vietnam

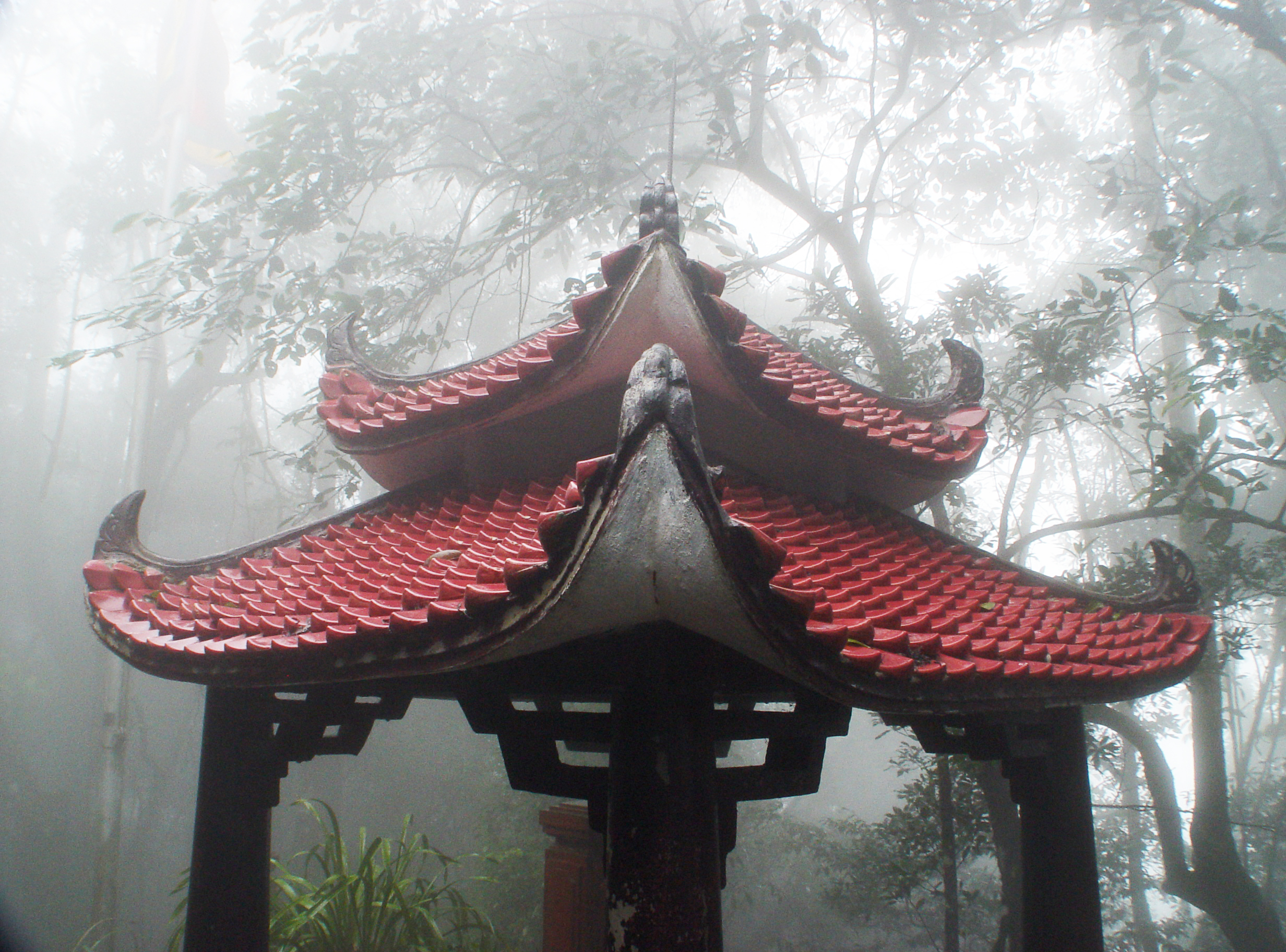
Ba Vì National Park, Ho Chi Minh Temple on King High Peak, Vietnam

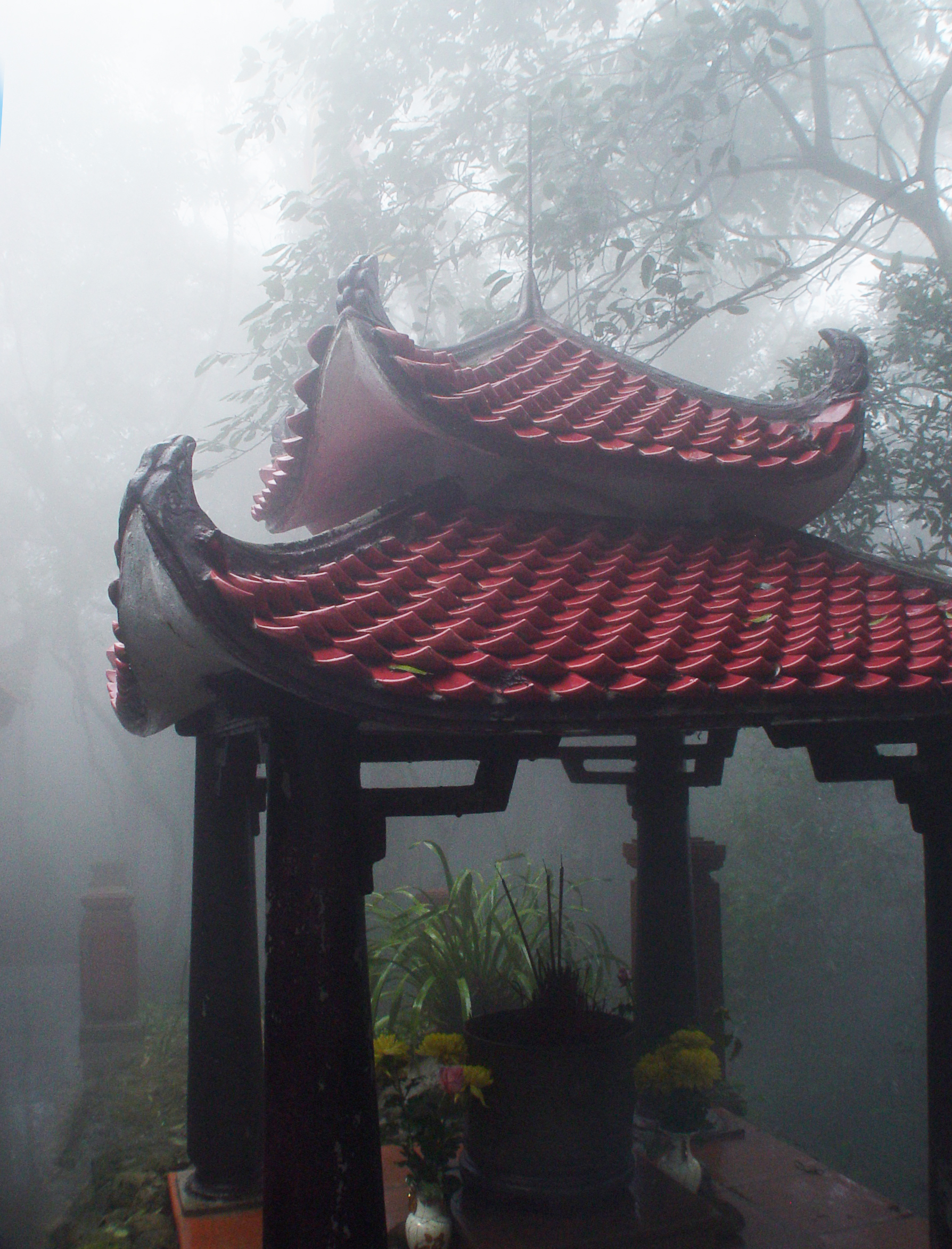
Ba Vì National Park, Ho Chi Minh Temple on King High Peak, Vietnam

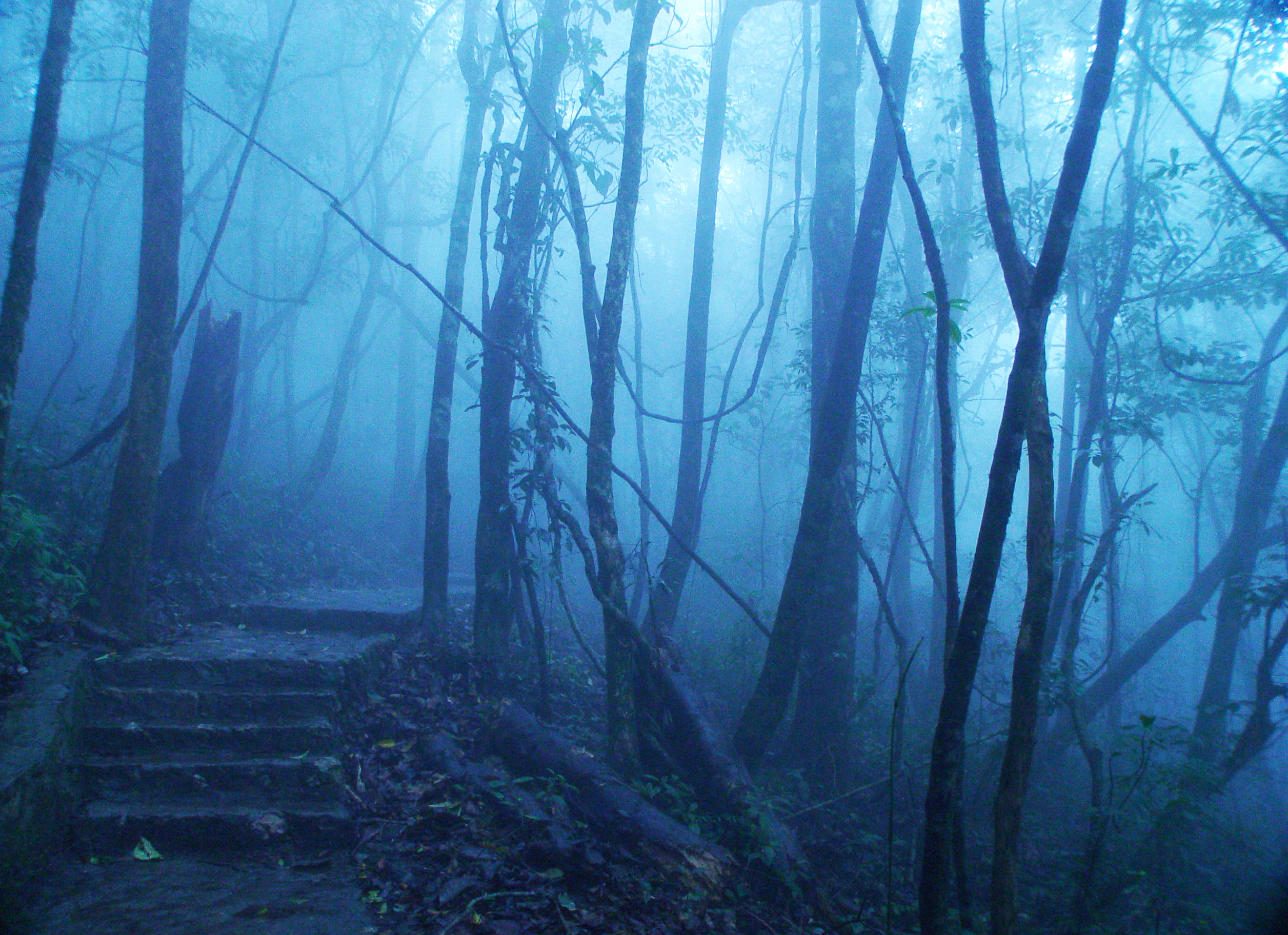
Ba Vì National Park, a few of the cloud shrouded 1,320 steps up King High Peak to the Ho Chi Minh Temple

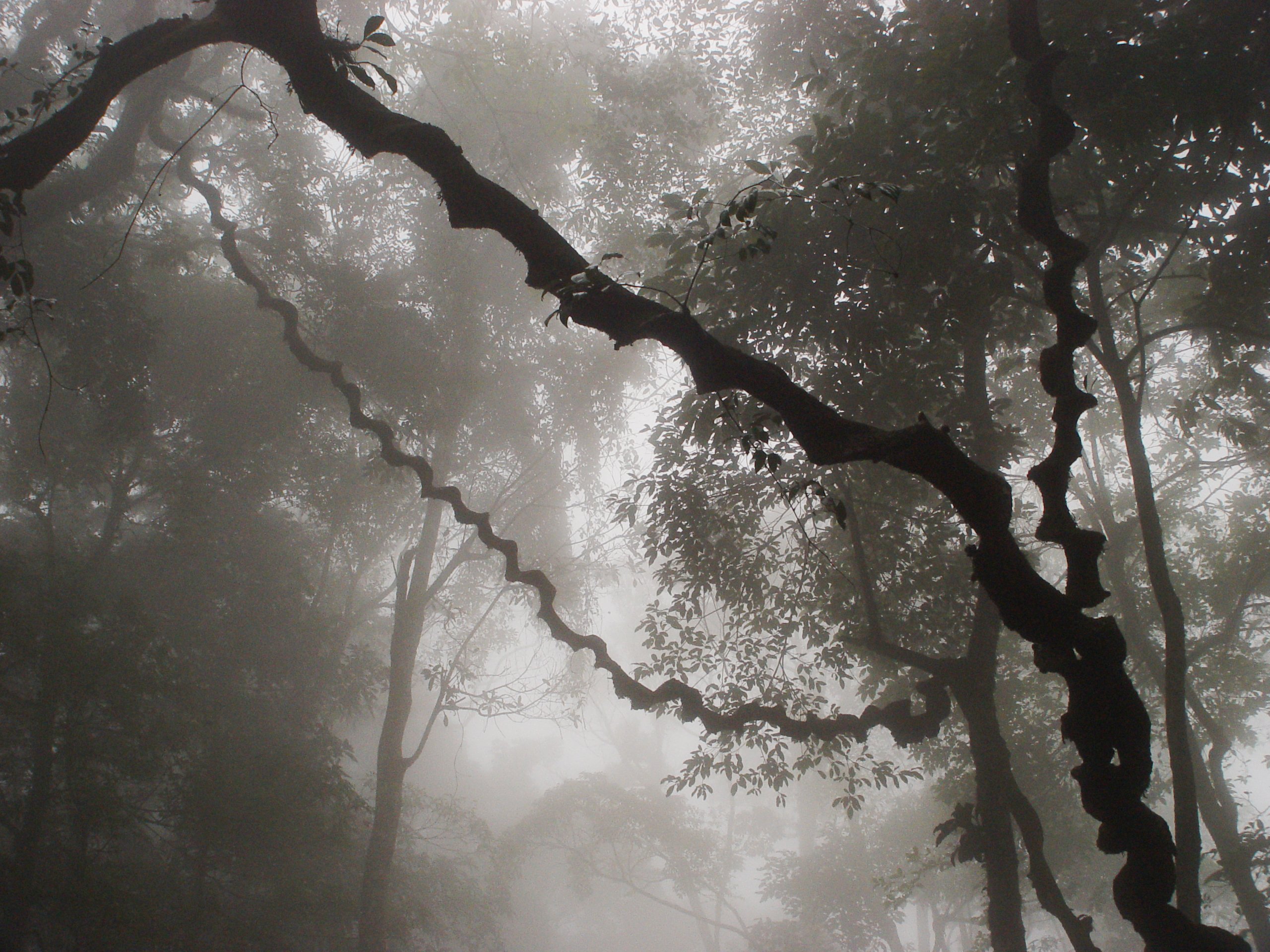
Ba Vì National Park, cloud shrouded forest on way up King High Peak to the Ho Chi Minh Temple
