= Tên chữ =

Places with other names of vernacular origin in Vietnam

Geographic Names
Native Vietnamese name (tên Nôm)	Sino-Vietnamese name (tên Chữ)
Sông Cả (滝哿)	Lam Giang (藍江)
Sông Luộc (滝𤐠)	Phú Nông (富農)
Núi Ba Vì (𡶀𠀧位)	Tản Viên (傘圓)
Kẻ Chợ (仉𢄂)	Hà Nội (河內)
Huế (化)	Thuận Hóa (順化)
Sài Gòn (柴棍)	Gia Định (嘉定)
Làng Báng (𰐁榜)	Đình Bảng (亭榜)
Làng Trèm (𰐁坫)	Từ Liêm (慈廉)
Đèo Ba Dội (𡸇𠀧𢵩)	Tam Điệp (三疊)
Cửa Eo (𨷯夭)	Thuận An (順安)

Tên chữ (chữ Nôm: 𠸛𡨸) are Vietnamese place names of Sino-Vietnamese origin that refer to locations which also have other names that are of vernacular origin. In many cases, these names are literary or formal and are less commonly used than their vernacular counterparts. The reasoning behind the names are for official and historical usage by the government which uses Hán văn (Literary Chinese) in official documents.

== Origin ==
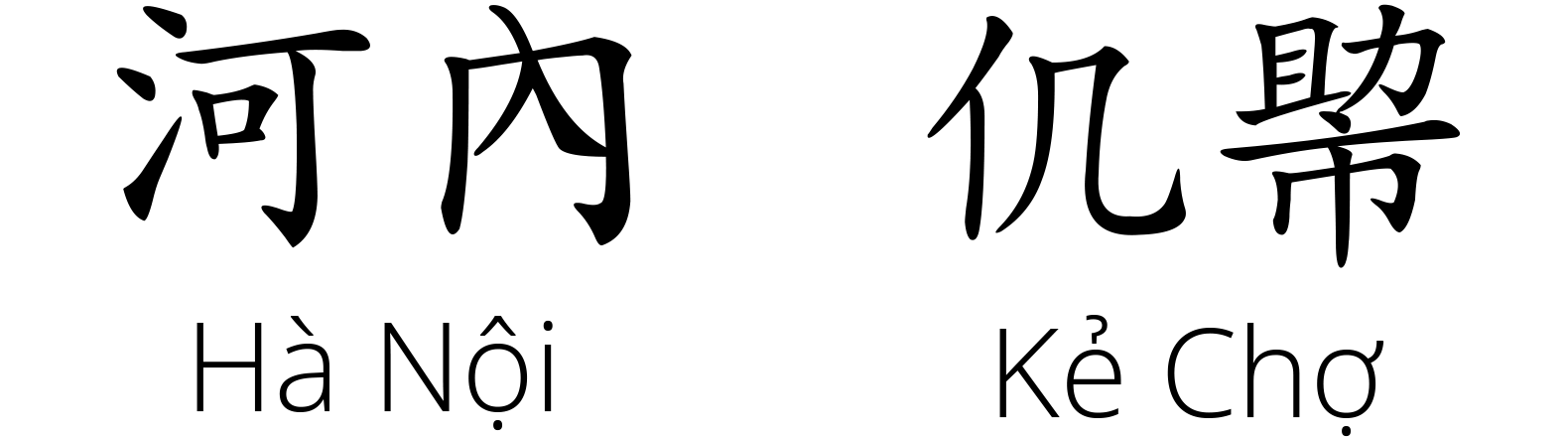
The name is sometimes called Địa danh chi Hán văn (地名之漢文).

It is used in contrast to the tên Nôm (𠸛喃), or vernacular name, which are of native Vietnamese origin. In the Red River Delta, the demotic Vietnamese place name often begins with "Kẻ" (仉); for example: Kẻ Mẩy 仉𨊋 (whereas the tên chữ, or Hán Việt name, is Mễ Trì 米池), Kẻ Cót 仉榾 (formally Yên Quyết 嫣決), Kẻ Vọng 仉望 (Dịch Vọng 懌望).

Many, if not most city names in Vietnam are Sino-Vietnamese, but some cities also have earlier Nôm names:

- Hà Nội 河內 (Hanoi) is Sino-Vietnamese and has had many Sino-Vietnamese names - Thăng Long 昇龍, Đông Kinh 東京 - but it also had a name in chữ Nôm, Kẻ Chợ 仉𢄂, found on some early Portuguese-made maps as "Cachao".

Major cities with Vietnamese demotic names include:

- Huế 化 is a fully Vietnamese demotic name: when written in chữ Nho it is named Thuận Hóa 順化 or Phú Xuân 富春.
- Sài Gòn 柴棍 (Saigon) is also a demotic name: the formal tên chữ historical name in chữ Nho is Gia Định 嘉定. However in Chinese, the name 嘉定 is seldom used. 西貢, which is the transliteration of "Sài Gòn", is much more common.
- Likewise Cam Ranh, Vũng Tàu, Phan Rang, Mỹ Tho, Cần Thơ, Kẻ Sặt, Bãi Cháy, Móng Cái, Chợ Lớn, Bến Nghé.

In these cases later Sino-Vietnamese names were derived by local Vietnamese Confucian administrators with homonymic phonetic approximations (Cam Ranh; Cam Linh) or semantic translations (Bến Nghé; Ngưu Chử). Some however are completely unrelated (Sông Cầu; Xuân Đài).
