= Ba Vì mountain range =

Mountain range in Vietnam

Ba Vì
- Tản Viên Sơn
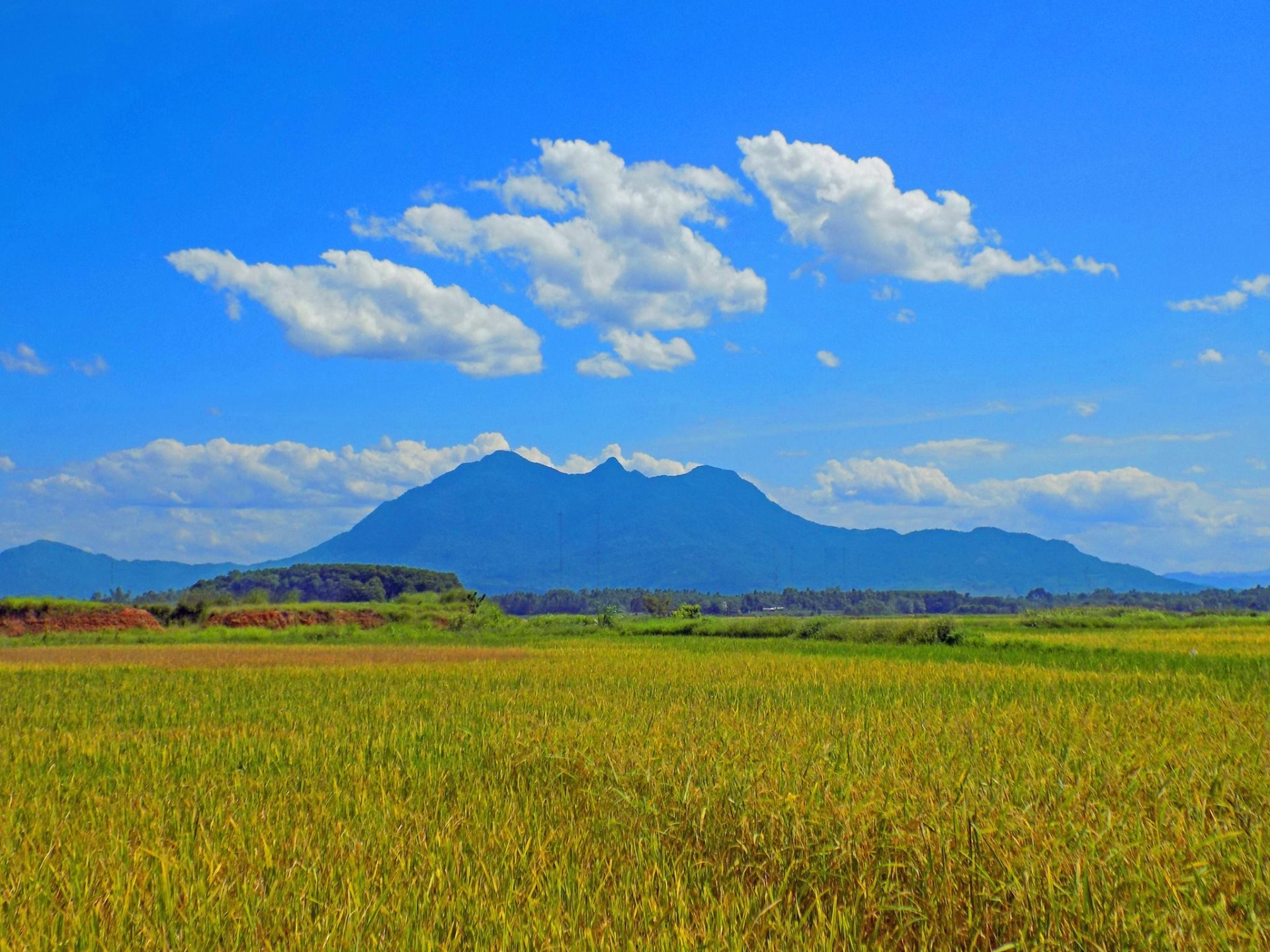
- Núi Tản Viên

Highest point
- Elevation: 1,296 m (4,252 ft)
- Listing: List of mountains in Vietnam
- Coordinates: 21°03′30″N 105°21′59″E

Geography
- Location within Vietnam
- Location: Vietnam

The Ba Vì mountain range (Tên Nôm: Núi Ba Vì, Chữ Nôm: 𡶀𠀧位; Tên chữ: Tản Viên Sơn, Chữ Hán: 傘圓山) is a soil-limestone mountain range in Vietnam. It covers an area of about 50 km^{2} in Ba Vì, Lương Sơn and Kỳ Sơn districts, Hòa Bình province. The Ba Vì mountain range is called "the lord of mountains" (núi chúa) in the Vietnamese folk religion although it is not the highest mountain range in Vietnam.

== History ==
There are many peaks in this range, but the most famous one is Tản Viên Peak. Tản Viên mountain is 1,281 m high. In Vietnamese mythology, this mountain is the home of Tản Viên Sơn Thánh, the mountain god. However, the highest mountain in this range is Vua Peak (or King Peak), which is 1296 m in elevation. A shrine to President Ho Chi Minh is located at the summit of this mountain.

At the western foot of the Ba Vì mountain range is the Đà river, while at the eastern edge is an artificial lake called Suối Hai, which is 7 km in length and 4 km in width.

The Ba Vì mountain range is covered by primary forests. Ba Vì National Park is a reservoir of biodiversity.

The Ba Vì mountain range is a well-known ecological tourism region in northern Vietnam.
