= Kỳ Sơn district, Hòa Bình =

Former district of Hoa Binh, Vietnam

Kỳ Sơn district Huyện Kỳ Sơn
- Former District
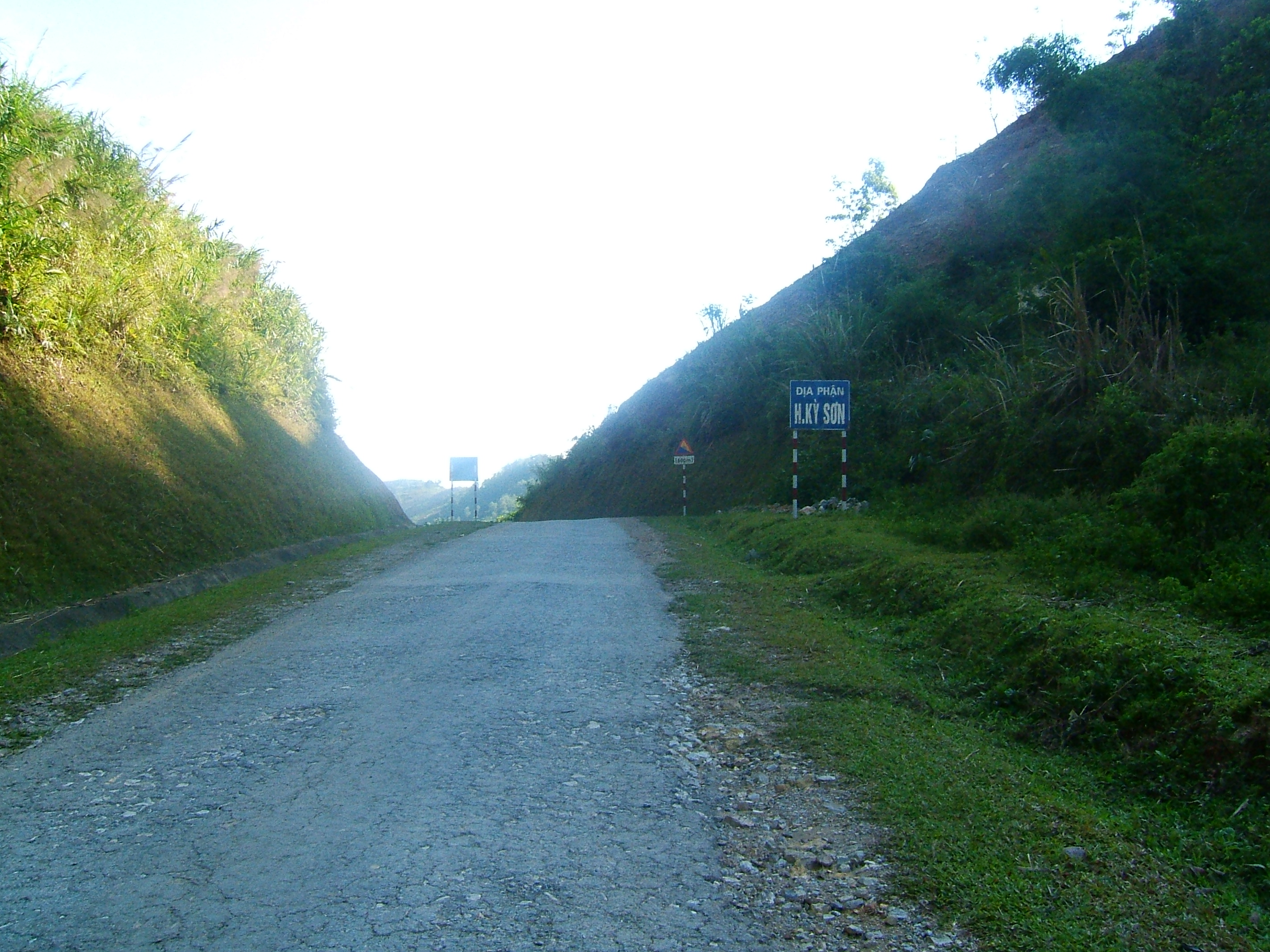
- Road into Kỳ Sơn district in 2008
- Interactive map of Kỳ Sơn district
- Country: Vietnam
- Region: Northwest
- Province: Hòa Bình
- District capital: Kỳ Sơn town (now Kỳ Sơn ward)
- Subdivisions: List: 1 town; 9 communes

Kỳ Sơn is a former district of Hòa Bình province in the Northwest region of Vietnam. As of 2003 the district had a population of 34,800. The district covers an area of 202 km². The district capital lies at Kỳ Sơn.

The district was annexed by the city of Hòa Bình on December 17, 2019.
