= List of short place names =

This is a list of short place names, natively in Latin characters or romanized, with one or two letters.

== One-letter place names ==
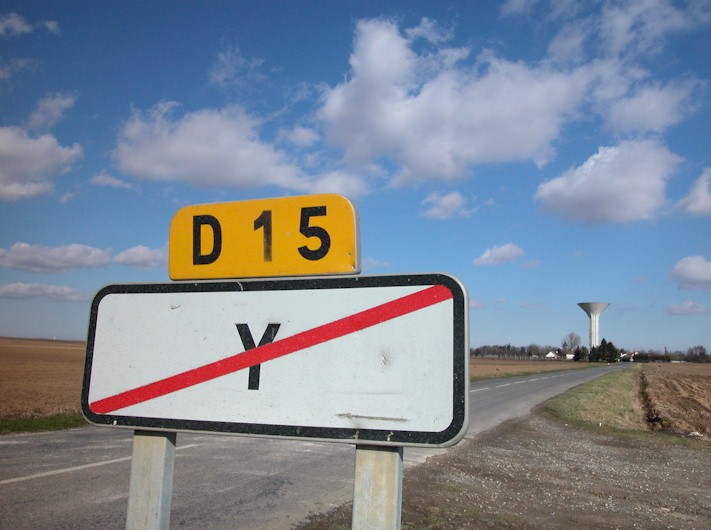
Road sign marking the end of the village of Y in the Somme département, France

- A, a former village in Kami-Amakusa city, Kumamoto, Japan
- Á, a farm in Dalabyggð municipality, Dalasýsla, Iceland. Á is Icelandic for "river".
- D, a river in Oregon, United States. It was also formerly believed to be the world's shortest river.
- E, a mountain in Hokkaidō, Japan
- E, a river in the Highlands of Scotland, United Kingdom
- É, an ancient name for the Dadu River in Sichuan, China
- È, an ancient state and current one-character name for Hubei, China
- H, also known as H Island, an island in Dyke Marsh Wildlife Preserve, in Fairfax County, Virginia, United States
- Ì, Scottish Gaelic name for island of Iona, Scotland (also called Ì Chaluim Chille)
- L, two lakes in Nebraska, United States, both named for their right-angled shape
- Ô, a castle near Mortrée, France
- O, a river in Devon, England, United Kingdom
- Ó Street in Terézváros, Budapest, Hungary. Ó means "old", "ancient" or "antique" in Hungarian.
- O, a river in Toyama, Japan
- Ø, a hill in Jutland, Denmark. Ø is Danish for "island".
- U, a municipality on Pohnpei in the Federated States of Micronesia
- Ü, a geographic division and a historical region in Tibet, China
- W, a national park in Niger, Burkina Faso, and Benin
- Y, a commune in the department of Somme, France
- Y, a river in the north of Russia
- Ý, Vietnamese name for Italy
- Y, a former census-designated place in Alaska, United States (recently renamed Susitna North)
- Å, a village in Andøy Municipality in Nordland, Norway. Å is Danish, Norwegian and Swedish for "brook" or "small river".
- Å, a village in Moskenes Municipality in Nordland, Norway
- Å, a village in Orkland Municipality in Trøndelag, Norway
- Å, a village in Åfjord Municipality in Trøndelag, Norway
- Å, a village in Ibestad Municipality in Troms, Norway
- Å, a village in Lavangen Municipality in Troms, Norway
- Å, a village in Senja Municipality in Troms, Norway
- Å, a village in Gloppen Municipality in Vestland, Norway
- Å, a place in Funen, Denmark
- Å, a village in Norrköping Municipality, Östergötland, Sweden
- Å, a village in Örnsköldsvik Municipality, Västernorrland, Sweden
- Å, a village in Kramfors Municipality, Västernorrland, Sweden
- Å, a village in Söderhamn Municipality, Gävleborg, Sweden
- Å, a village in Uddevalla Municipality, Västra Götaland, Sweden
- Ö, a village in Ånge Municipality, Västernorrland County, Sweden
- IJ, a double lake in the Netherlands, and the name of the river that flows between Amsterdam and North Amsterdam. The digraph IJ is considered a single letter in Dutch: It's an alternate way to write Y. "The IJ" is written as "Het IJ" or, more often, "'t IJ", which means it's only two letters including the word "the".

== Two-letter place names ==
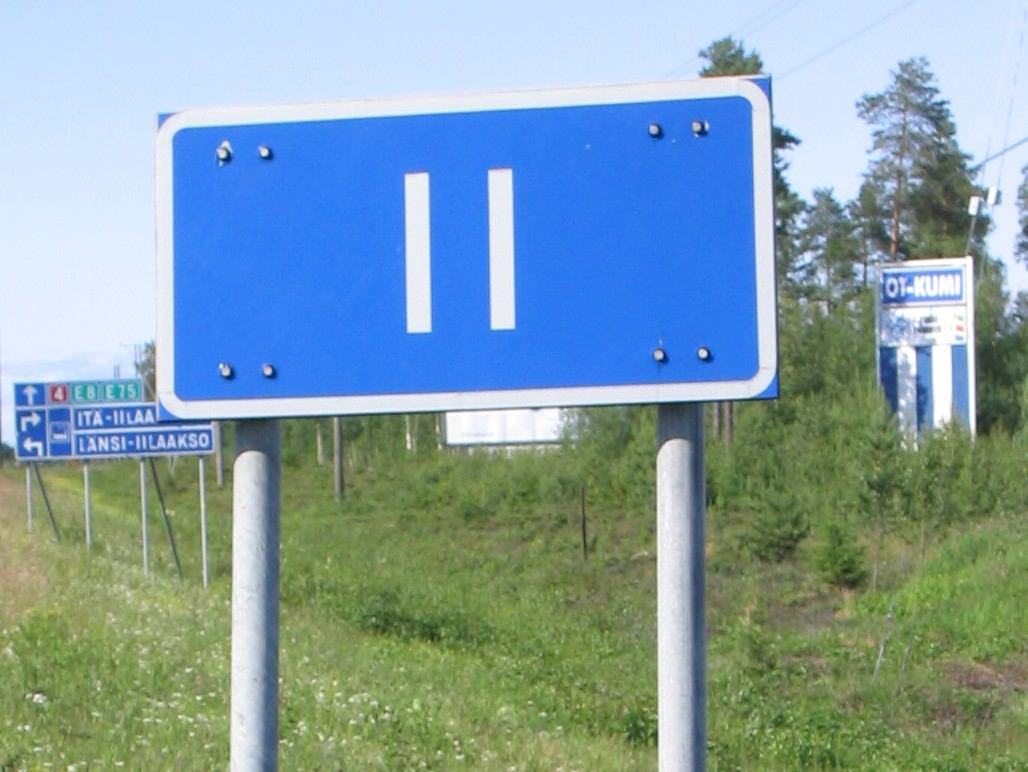
Road sign of Ii, Finland

- Aa, a village in Estonia
- Aa, a village in South Sulawesi, Indonesia
- Aa, several rivers in Belgium, France, Germany, the Netherlands and Switzerland
- Aa, a skerry at the entrance to Skelda Voe, Shetland Islands, Scotland
- Ab, in Madhya Pradesh, India
- Ae, a village in Dumfries and Galloway, Scotland
- Ág, a village in Baranya county, Hungary
- Ai, a Biblical city in Canaan
- Ai, a community in Alabama, United States
- Ai, a community in Georgia, United States
- Ai, a community in North Carolina, United States
- Ai, a community in Ohio, United States (shortest place name in Ohio)
- Ai, several rivers in China, Japan, and Taiwan
- Áj, Hungarian name for Háj, Slovakia
- Ål, a municipality in Buskerud county, Norway
- Ål, a village in Leksand Municipality, Sweden
- An, a county in Sichuan, China
- Ao, a village in Estonia
- Ao, a train station in Hyōgo, Japan
- Áo, Vietnamese name for Austria
- As, a municipality in Limburg province, Belgium
- Aš, a town in the Karlovy Vary Region, Czechia
- Ås, a municipality in Akershus county, Norway
- Ås, the Swedish name for the Harju quarter of Helsinki, Finland
- Ås, a hundred of Västergötland in Sweden
- Ås, a village in Västmanland, Sweden
- Ås, a village in Jämtland, Sweden
- At, a village in Bihar, India
- Au, a town in the state of Vorarlberg, Austria. Au, short for Aue, is German for "meadow".
- Au, a district of the city of Munich, Germany
- Au, name of three municipalities in Germany: Au am Rhein, Au (Breisgau) and Au in der Hallertau
- Au, name of almost hundred of villages and hamlets in Germany, mostly in Bavaria: Au (Sieg) and others
- Au, a town in the Kankan Region, Guinea
- Au, a municipality in the canton of St. Gallen, Switzerland
- Au, a village in the canton of Zürich, Switzerland
- Ay, an island in Banda Sea, Indonesia
- Aÿ, a former commune in the department of Marne, France
- Ba, a village in Serbia
- Ba, a town in the Ba province of Fiji
- Ba, a sub-district in Tha Tum district, Surin Province, Thailand
- Bỉ, Vietnamese name for Belgium
- Bo, a city in Sierra Leone
- Bo, a town in Kim Bôi, Hòa Bình Province, Vietnam
- Bo, the Asturian name for the parish of Boo, Asturias, Spain
- Bo, a sub-district in Khlung District, Chanthaburi Province, Thailand
- Bo, a village in Burkina Faso
- Bu, a hamlet on Wyre in the Orkney Islands, Scotland
- Bû, a commune in the department of Eure-et-Loir, France
- By, a village in Åfjord Municipality Norway
- By, a commune in the department of Doubs, France
- Bø Municipality (Telemark) and Bø Municipality (Nordland), municipalities in Telemark and Nordland counties, Norway; also the name of several farms
- Bő, a village in Vas county, Hungary
- Cả, a river in Vietnam
- Ce, a historical kingdom in modern-day Scotland
- Ci, a county in Hebei, China
- Da, a town in Burkina Faso
- Đà, a river in Vietnam
- Di, a town in Burkina Faso
- Do, several villages in Bosnia and Herzegovina, including Do (Hadžići) and Do (Trebinje)
- Du, a sub-district in Kanthararom District, Sisaket, Thailand
- Du, a sub-district in Prang Ku District, Sisaket, Thailand
- Du, a sub-district in Rasi Salai District, Sisaket, Thailand
- Du, a mountain in Henan province, China
- Dú, the Irish name for Hurcle, a townland in County Meath, Ireland
- Đu, a town in Thai Nguyen, Vietnam
- Ea, a town in the Basque Country, Spain
- Ed, an unincorporated community in Kentucky, US
- Ed, a locality in Västra Götaland County, Sweden
- Ee, a village in the Noardeast-Fryslân municipality, Friesland, Netherlands
- Eg, a town in Afghanistan
- Eg, a former farm in Kristiansand Municipality, Norway
- Ei, a town in Ibusuki District, Kagoshima, Japan
- Ei, a train station in Kagoshima, Japan
- Eo, river between Galicia and Asturias, Spain
- Ep, a community in Kentucky, United States
- Ér, Hungarian name for Ier river, Romania
- Eš, a village and municipality in the Vysočina Region, Czechia
- Eu, a commune in the department of Seine-Maritime, France
- Fa, a commune in the department of Aude, France
- Fi, a town in Segou city in Mali
- Fu, a county in Shaanxi, China
- Fu, a village in Mora Municipality, Sweden
- Go, a village in Raja Ampat Regency, Southwest Papua, Indonesia.
- Gu, a county in Shanxi, China
- Gy, a commune in the department of Haute-Saône, France
- Gy, a municipality in the canton of Geneva, Switzerland
- Ha, a town in Paro, Paro District, Bhutan
- Hå, a municipality in Rogaland, Norway
- He, a farm in Nord-Odal Municipality, Norway
- He, a county in Anhui, China
- Ho, a town in Ghana
- Ho, a village in Jutland, Denmark
- Hồ, a town in Thuận Thành, Bắc Ninh, Vietnam
- Hø, a farm in Inderøy Municipality, Norway
- Hu, a county in Shaanxi, China
- Hu, a town in Qena Governorate, Egypt
- Ib, a railway town in India
- Ie, an island and village in Okinawa, Japan
- Ie, old Irish name for the Scottish island of Iona or Ì (or Ì Chaluim Chille)
- If, an island and fortress in southern France
- Ig, a settlement and municipality in Slovenia
- Ii, a municipality in Northern Ostrobothnia, Finland
- Ii, a train station in Yamaguchi, Japan
- Ik, a river in Russia
- Io, innermost large moon of Jupiter
- Io, an island in Vestland, Norway
- Io, alternative name of an island in the Aegean, Greece
- Ip, a village in Sălaj County, Romania
- Ir, town in Almaty Province, Kazakhstan
- Is, a village in Nizhniy Tura gorsovet of Sverdlovskaya Oblast Oblast, Russia
- Iž, an island in Croatia
- Ji, a county in Shanxi, China
- Ji, a county in Tianjin, China
- Ju, a county in Shandong, China
- Ka, a farm in Østre Toten Municipality, Norway
- Ko, a village and subdistrict in Li District, Lamphun, Thailand
- Kő, the Hungarian name for Kamenac, a village in Kneževi Vinogradi municipality, Osijek-Baranja County, Croatia
- Kō, a train station in Aichi, Japan
- Ku, a sub-district in Prang Ku District, Sisaket, Thailand
- La, a farm in Sykkylven Municipality, Norway
- Lå, a farm in Ål Municipality, Norway
- La, a river in Vietnam
- Lâ, a town in Burkina Faso
- Le, a farm in Vik Municipality, Norway
- Le, a sub-district in Kapong District, Phang Nga, Thailand
- Lé, the Irish name for Lea, a parish in County Laois, Ireland
- Li, a county in Gansu, China
- Li, a county in Hebei, China
- Li, a county in Hunan, China
- Li, a county in Sichuan, China
- Li, a mountain located in the northeast of Xi'an in Shaanxi Province, China where the tomb of the First Emperor is located.
- Li, a village in Sokndal Municipality, Norway
- Li, a district in Lamphun Province, Thailand
- Lo, a town in West Flanders, Belgium
- Lo, name of several farms in Norway
- Lo, a sub-district in Chun District, Phayao, Thailand
- Lo, a village in Di Department, Burkina Faso
- Lô, a river in the North of Vietnam
- Lø, farm in Vindafjord Municipality, Norway
- Lu, a municipality in Piedmont, Italy
- Lu, a county in Sichuan, China
- Lü, a village in the canton of Graubünden, Switzerland
- Lú, the Irish name for Louth, a village and county in Ireland
- Lủ, a village in Hanoi, Vietnam
- Ma, a river in Vietnam
- Me, a town in Gia Viễn, Ninh Bình, Vietnam
- Mo, a village in Modalen Municipality, Vestland county, Norway
- Mo, a sub-district in Kapong District, Phang Nga, Thailand
- Mu, a river in Burma
- Mù (Mö in the local dialect), a village in the Edolo municipality of Lombardy, Italy
- My, a village in Liège province, Belgium
- Mỹ, Vietnamese name for United States
- Nå, a village in Ullensvang Municipality, Norway
- Ne, a municipality in Liguria, Italy
- Ni, a river of New Caledonia
- Ni, a river in Virginia, United States
- No, a village in Denmark
- No, a lake in South Sudan
- Ny, a municipality in Luxembourg province, Belgium
- Oa, a river in Orkland Municipality, Norway
- Oa, a peninsula on the island of Islay in the Inner Hebrides, Scotland
- Ob, a town in Russia
- Ob, a major river in Russia, and the seventh-longest river in the world
- Ob, a gulf in Russia
- Öd, several small villages in different municipalities in Bavaria, Germany
- Oe, a village on Yeongheung island, Incheon city, Korea
- Ōe, a town in Yamagata, Japan
- Ōe, a former town in Kyoto, Japan
- Ōe, a train station in Kyoto, Japan
- Ōe, a train station in Aichi, Japan
- Oe, a train station in Nagasaki, Japan
- Oe, a town in Liège city in Walloon Region, Belgium
- Of, a town in the province of Trabzon, Turkey
- Og, a river in Wiltshire, England
- Oi, a sub-district in Pong District, Phayao, Thailand
- Ōi, a town in Ōi District, Fukui, Japan
- Ōi, a town in Kanagawa, Japan
- Ōi, a former town in Saitama, Japan
- Ok, a shield volcano located in highlands above Borgarfjörður, in the west of Iceland
- O K, a community in Kentucky, United States
- Om, a river in Russia
- Øm, a town on the island of Zealand, Denmark
- Øn, a village in Vestland county, Norway
- Oô, a commune in the department of Haute-Garonne, France
- Or, original name of Isthmus of Perekop in Ukraine
- Ör, a district in Sundbyberg Municipality, Sweden
- Őr, a village in Szabolcs-Szatmár-Bereg county, Hungary
- Os, a municipality in Innlandet, Norway
- Os, a former municipality in Hordaland, Norway
- Oś, a village in Kluczbork County, Poland
- Ōu, a mountain range in Japan
- Ox, a mountain range in Ireland
- Oy, a municipality in Bavaria, Germany
- Oz, a commune in the department of Isère, France
- Oz, a community in Kentucky, United States
- Pa, a village in Nouna Department in Burkina Faso
- Pâ, a town in Burkina Faso
- Pi, a town in Catalonia, Spain
- Pi, a county in Sichuan, China
- Po, a river in Italy
- Po, a river in Virginia, United States
- Po, a sub-district in Wiang Kaen District, Chiang Rai, Thailand
- Po, a sub-district in Bueng Bun District, Sisaket, Thailand
- Pó, a civil parish in Bombarral, Portugal
- Pô, a city in Burkina Faso
- Pu, a county in Shanxi, China
- Py, a commune in Pyrénées-Orientales, France
- Qi, a county in Kaifeng, Henan, China
- Qi, a county in Hebi, Henan, China
- Qi, a county in Jinzhong, Shanxi, China
- Qu, a county in Sichuan, China
- Ra, a farm in Borre Municipality, Norway
- Rå, a farm in Ringerike Municipality, Norway
- Re, a village in the region of Piedmont, Italy
- Re, a former municipality in Vestfold county, Norway
- Ré, an island in Charente-Maritime department, France
- Ri, a commune in the department of Orne, France
- Ro, an island near Kastelorizo, Greece
- Ro, a municipality in the region of Emilia-Romagna, Italy
- Ro, name of several farms in Norway
- Ru, a village in the municipality of Vilasantar, Galicia, Spain
- Ry, a town in central Jutland, Denmark
- Ry, a commune in the department of Seine-Maritime, France
- Sa, a sub-district in Chiang Muan District, Phayao, Thailand
- Sâ, a town in Burkina Faso
- Sé, several places, including Brazil, Hungary and Portugal
- Si, a county in Anhui, China
- Si, a sub-district in Khun Han District, Sisaket, Thailand
- Sí, the Irish name for Shee, a townland in County Monaghan, Ireland
- So, a sub-district in So Phisai District, Bueng Kan, Thailand
- Só, Hungarian name for Tuzla, Bosnia and Herzegovina
- Su, a village in the municipality of Riner, Catalonia, Spain
- Su, a village in Sanandaj County, Kurdistan province, Iran
- Sy, a commune in the department of Ardennes, France
- Sy, a municipality in Liège province, Belgium
- Ta, a sub-district in Khun Tan District, Chiang Rai, Thailand
- Ta, a river in Virginia, United States
- Ta, a village in Kurdistan Province, Iran
- TB, a community in Maryland, United States
- Ti, a settlement in Oklahoma, United States
- Tô, village in Toma Department, Burkina Faso
- Tu, a mountain in Cao County, Shandong Province
- Tu, a city in Japan. Tu is in Kunrei-shiki romanization and Tsu in Hepburn romanization is more common. (Other than Mount E this is the shortest place name in Japan in both Japanese phonology and orthography. All other Japanese place names in this section require at least two kana.)
- Ub, a town in Serbia
- Úc, Vietnamese name for Australia
- Ui, a town in Republic of Korea
- Ug, short name for Tiszaug, Hungary
- Ul, a parish in the Oliveira de Azeméis municipality in Portugal
- Ul, a beach in Punta Križa, Croatia
- Ur, ancient city in Mesopotamia
- Ur, a town in Catalonia, Spain
- Ur, a commune in the department of Pyrénées-Orientales, France
- Us, a commune in the department of Val-d'Oise, France
- Uz, a commune in the department of Hautes-Pyrénées, France
- Uz, river and valley in Romania
- Ūz, a village in Iran
- Uz, an unincorporated community in Kentucky, US
- Ve, a village in Norway
- Ve, a group of skerries off Papa Stour in the Shetland Islands, Scotland
- Vi, a village near Sundsvall in Sweden
- Vò, a municipality in the region of Veneto, Italy
- Vò, a village in Lạc Thủy, Hòa Bình, Vietnam
- Vy, a town in Burkina Faso
- Wa, a municipality in Ghana
- Wu, a region in the Jiangsu and Zhejiang provinces of China
- Wy, a hamlet in Luxembourg province, Belgium
- Xi, a county in Shanxi, China
- Xi, a county in Henan, China
- Xy, a commune in Hướng Hóa, Quảng Trị, Vietnam
- Yb, two villages and a municipality in Komi in Russia
- Ye, a town in Mon State, Burma
- Ye, a county in Henan, China
- Ye, a village on the island of Lanzarote, Spain
- Yé, department and town in Burkina Faso
- Yi, a name of three counties in Hebei, Liaoning and Anhui, China
- Yí, a river in Uruguay
- Y P, a desert in the western United States
- Ys, a mythological city in Brittany
- Yu, a county in Hebei, China
- Yu, a county in Shanxi, China
- Yu, a river on the north of Russia
- Yū, a former town, now district in Iwakuni, Yamaguchi, Japan
- Zu, a village in Badakhshan Province, Afghanistan
- Zu, a location in the town of Tavernola Bergamasca, in Italy

== See also ==
- List of long place names
- Long place names in English
- W National Park, a national park encompassing Benin, Niger, and Burkina Faso
- One-letter word
