= Å, Sweden =

Village in Sweden

Coordinates: 58.49638°N 16.50166°E

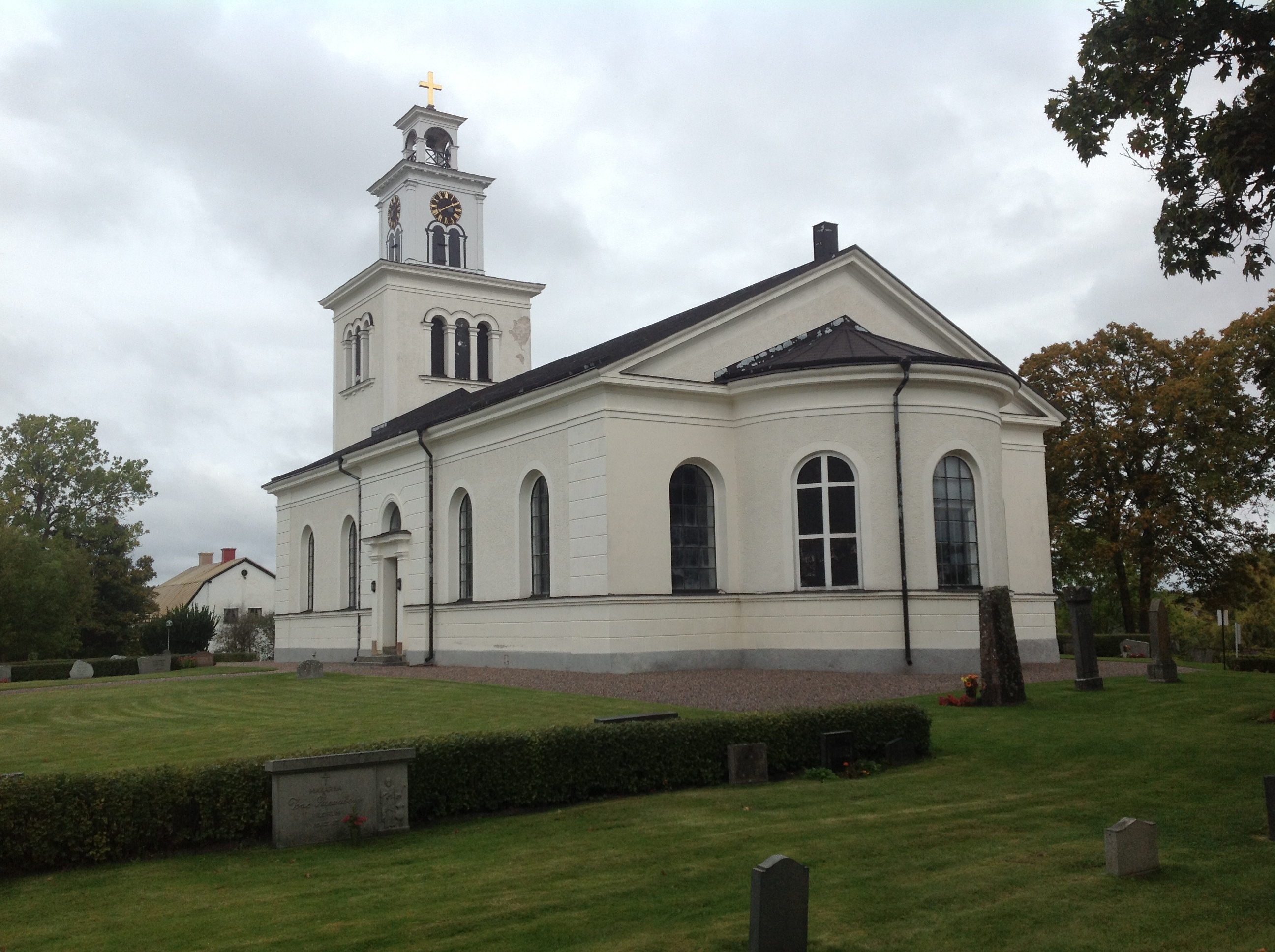
- The new Å church, built in the 1840s
- Interactive map of Å, Sweden
- Country: Sweden
- County: Östergötland County
- Municipality: Norrköping Municipality

Population
  - Total: 200

Å is a small village, district and former parish in Norrköping Municipality, Östergötland County, Sweden. As of 2023, the district has a population of about 200.

== Name ==
Å, which means 'stream' or 'small river', is one of the shortest place-name in the world, along with other places named Å, Ö, and Y. As a consequence, many tourists have ventured to the village for the sole purpose of either taking photos of or stealing the place-name sign.

== Monuments ==
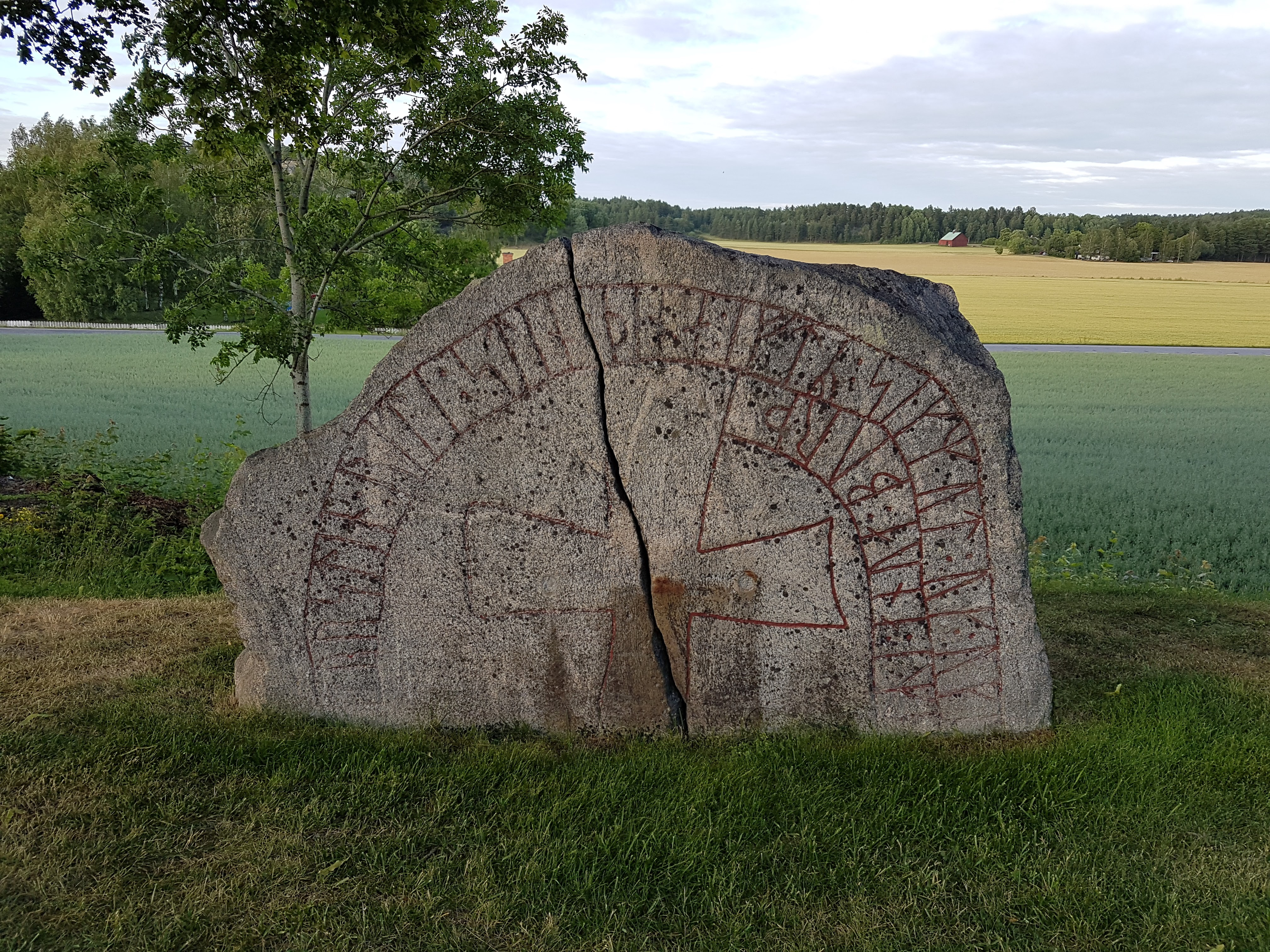
One of the Norse runestones found in Å

The parish of Å is rich in ancient remains, of which the oldest date from the Stone Age. A number of Norse runestones can be found in the district. The medieval stone parish church which burned down in 1878 has been preserved as a ruin. The present "new" church was built in 1844-46.
