= Suy =

Suy or SUY may refer to:

- Suy, Iran
- Sulfolactate sulfo-lyase
- Sudbury railway station, Suffolk, United Kingdom
- Sunbury railway station, Melbourne, Australia
