= Werbomont =

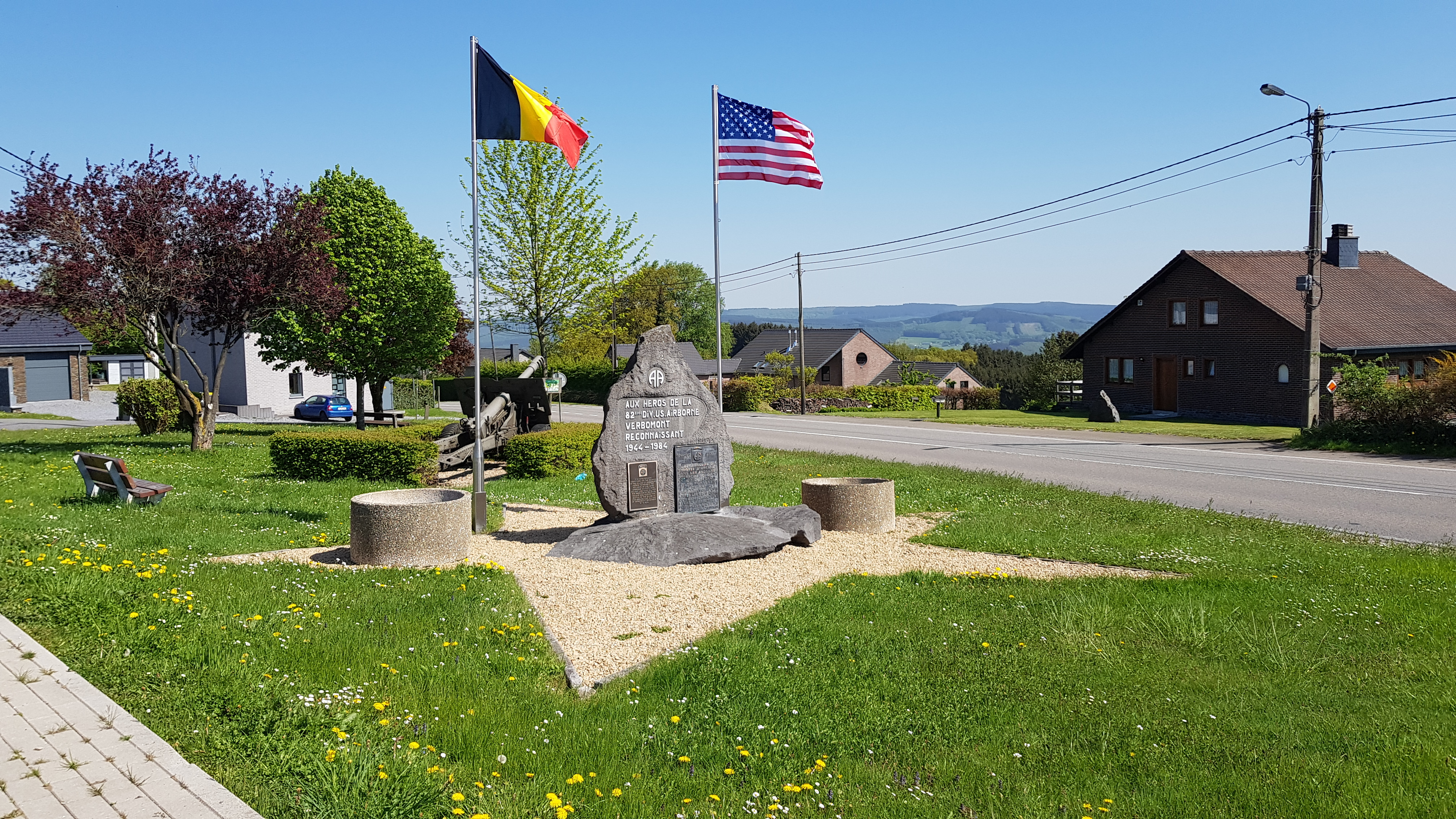
- Werbomont, memorial dedicated to the 82nd Airborne Division

- Location within Belgium Location within Europe
- Coordinates: 50°22′49″N 05°41′09″E
- Country: Belgium
- Region: Wallonia
- Province: Liège
- Municipality: Ferrières

Werbomont (French pronunciation: [wɛʁbɔmɔ̃]) is a village and district of the municipality of Ferrières, located in the province of Liège in Wallonia, Belgium.

In December 1944, the village and surrounding area was defended by the 82nd Airborne Division against Nazi German troops during the Battle of the Bulge. Due to bad weather, the American paratroopers had to fight the Germans without the support of aircraft or heavy weapons.
