= My, Belgium =

My Mî (Walloon)
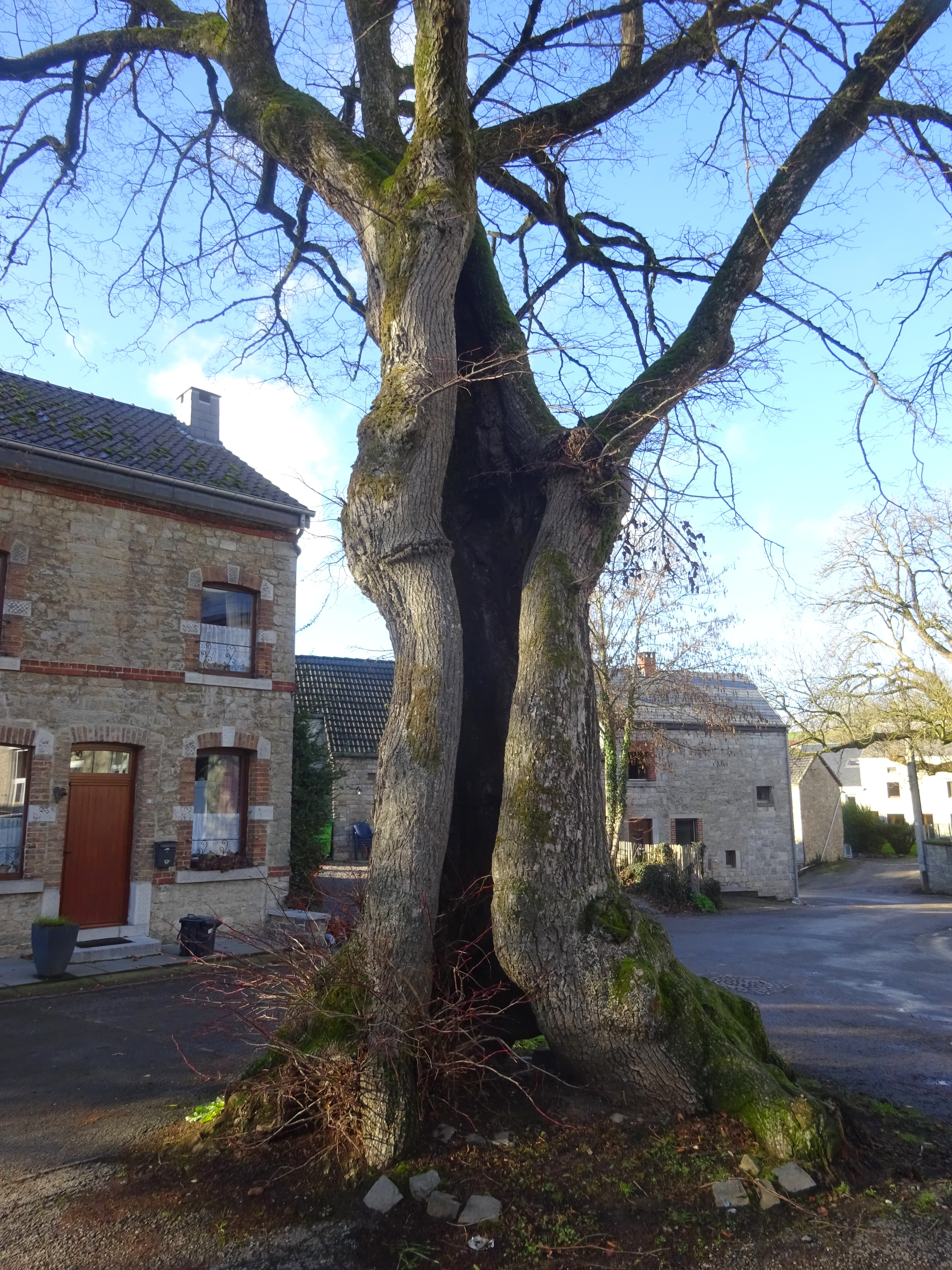
- The old lime tree of My.
- Interactive map of My
- Coordinates: 50°24′N 005°34′E
- Country: Belgium
- Region: Wallonia
- Province: Liège
- Municipality: Ferrières
- Demonym: Mytois(e)
- Postal code: 4190
- Area code: 086

My (Walloon: Mî) is a village of Wallonia and a district of the municipality of Ferrières, in the province of Liège, Belgium.

Since 2009, My has been part of Les Plus Beaux Villages de Wallonie (in English: "The Most Beautiful Villages of Wallonia").

== Location ==
My is located along national road 86 (Aywaille-Marche-en-Famenne) between Xhoris and Vieuxville. The village is situated in the Calestienne to the north of the wooded valley of the Lembrée. The villages neighbouring My are: Filot, Xhoris, Ferrières, Izier (province of Luxembourg) and Vieuxville.

== Description ==
The village is mainly built of limestone and is centred around the brick-built Church of the Assumption of the Holy Virgin. Rue du Vieux Tilleul runs through the historic core of the village.

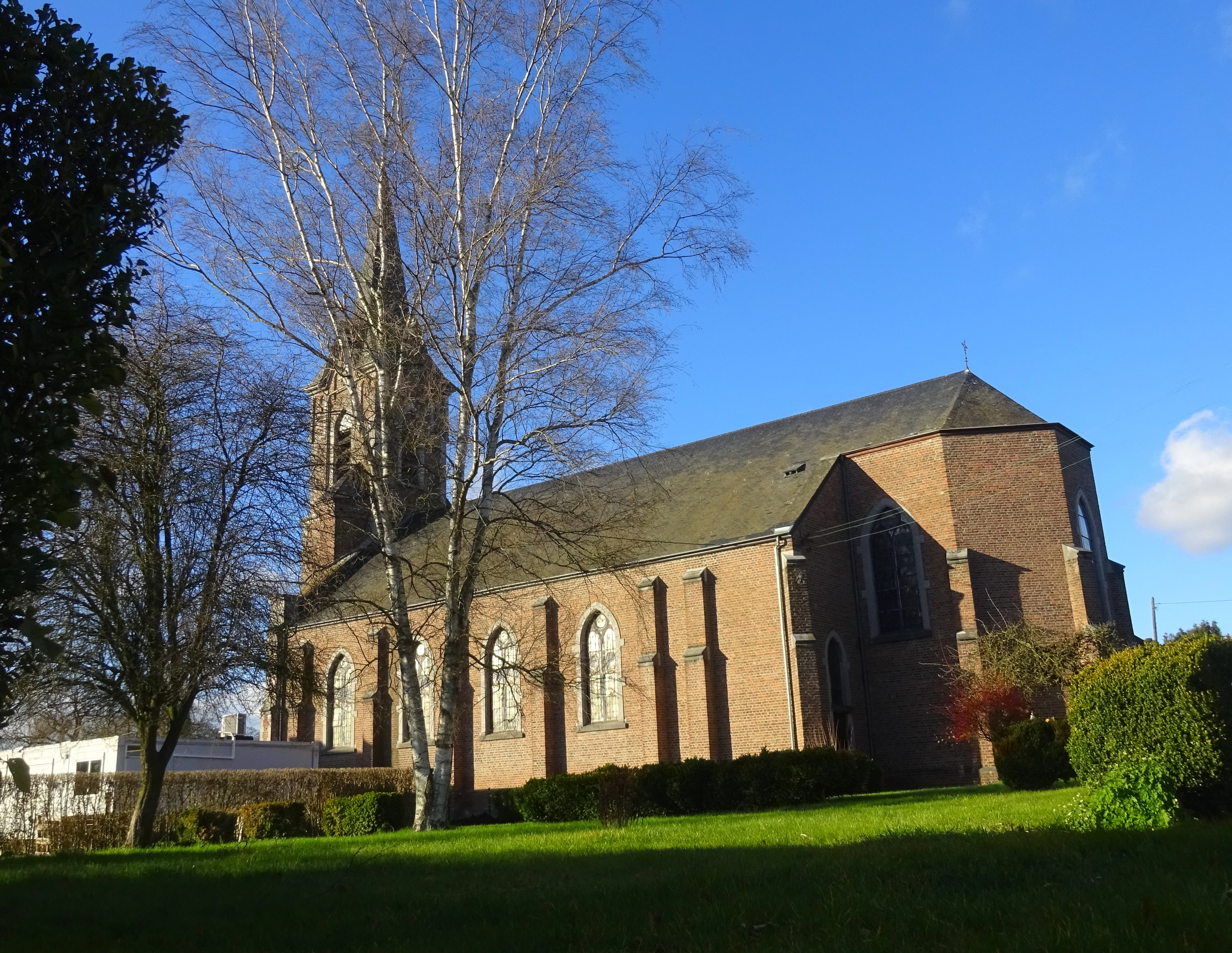
The Church of the Assumption of the Holy Virgin in My

The former municipality of My had two hamlets:

- Ville is located at the crossroads of national road 66 (Huy-Malmedy) and national road 86. Its castle is set in a lovely wooded park.
- Landrecy

== Heritage ==
In the centre of the village, near the school built in 1840, there stands an old lime tree with a split trunk. This age-old tree gave its name to the village's main street. Rue du Vieux Tilleul has several houses built mainly during the 18th and 19th centuries.

The Church of the Assumption of the Holy Virgin was built mainly of brick in 1868 in the neo-Gothic style to replace an old building demolished a few years earlier.

The Wibin-Gillard castle-farm (castle-farm of My) is a large (100 m by 40 m) mainly 18th-century limestone building with two inner courtyards and a three-storey gatehouse under a slate roof. It is located in the western part of the village. An initial house existed in 1112. It was greatly transformed in 1727 for the lords of Martiny and in 1803, in a neoclassical style, for Marie-Constance de Pasquet d'Acosse. The farm occupies the northern part and the castle, the southern part, a little below. A hundred-year-old road lined by plane trees connects national road 86 to the castle-farm.

Located at Terre du Jardin in the centre of the village, about 150 m downhill to the south of the church, the former farm now known as manoir d’Ange is a complex of buildings placed in a U-shape with a three-and-a-half-storey 17th-century gatehouse under a slate roof on the front, as well as a round tower inside the property. To the right of the entrance porch, the building is extended by the Gillard house, a five-bay building from the 17th century redesigned in 1761 as indicated by a chronogram on the façade.

North of the national road, Rue Sur le Mont has many old limestone houses and farmhouses often built in the 18th and 19th centuries. At the bottom of the street, a staircase leads to a tunnel under the national road and then to the centre of the village via the Rue des Roches where a cast iron water pump made around 1900 can be seen, supplying a series of seven long limestone troughs with water.

To the east and below the village, on the banks of the Lembrée river, the farm (or mill) of Lembrée is a U-shaped construction comprising an old oil mill built in several stages in sandstone rubble, limestone and brick in the 18th and 19th centuries.

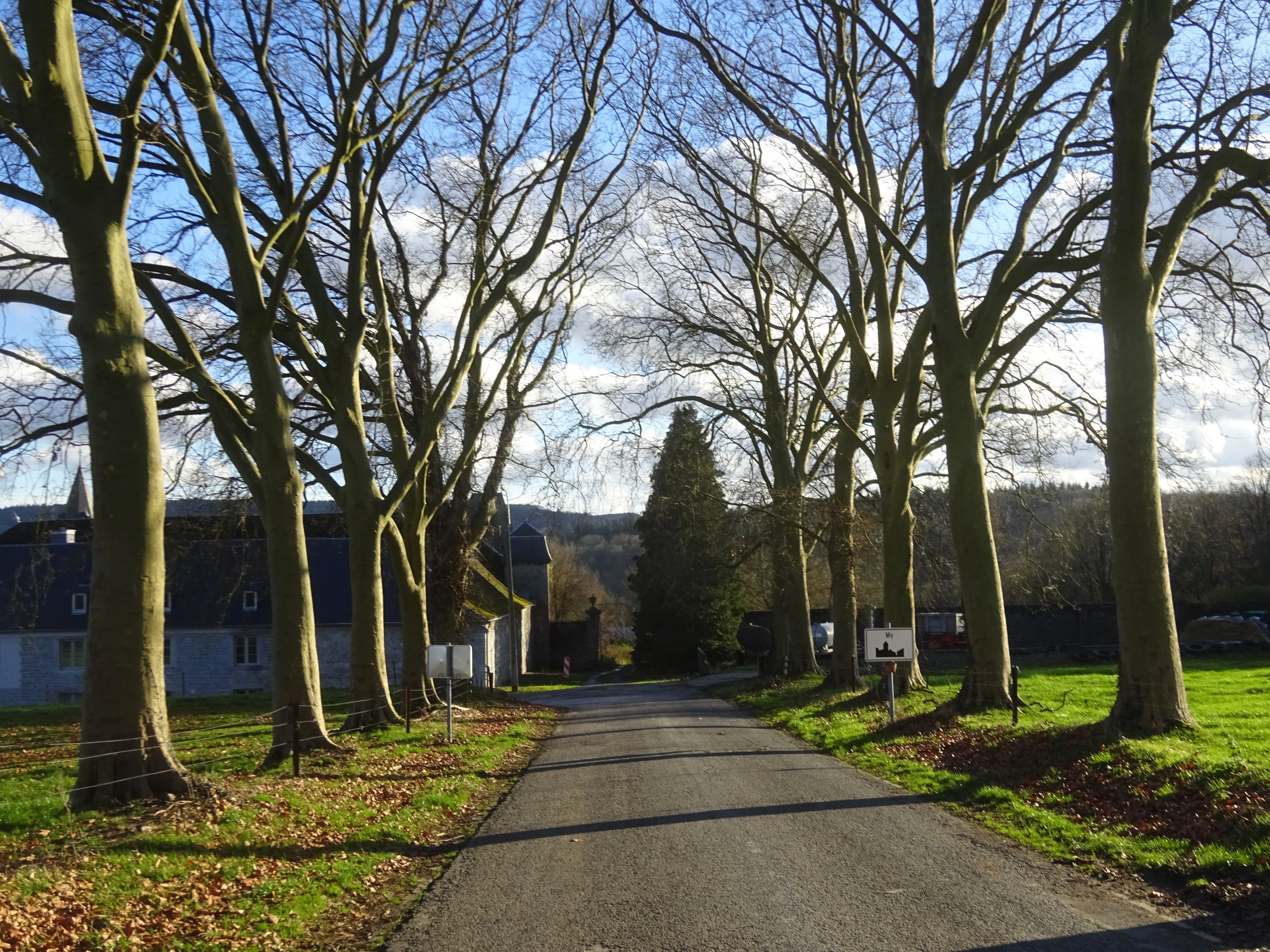
The tree-lined road in front of the Wibin-Gillard castle-farm

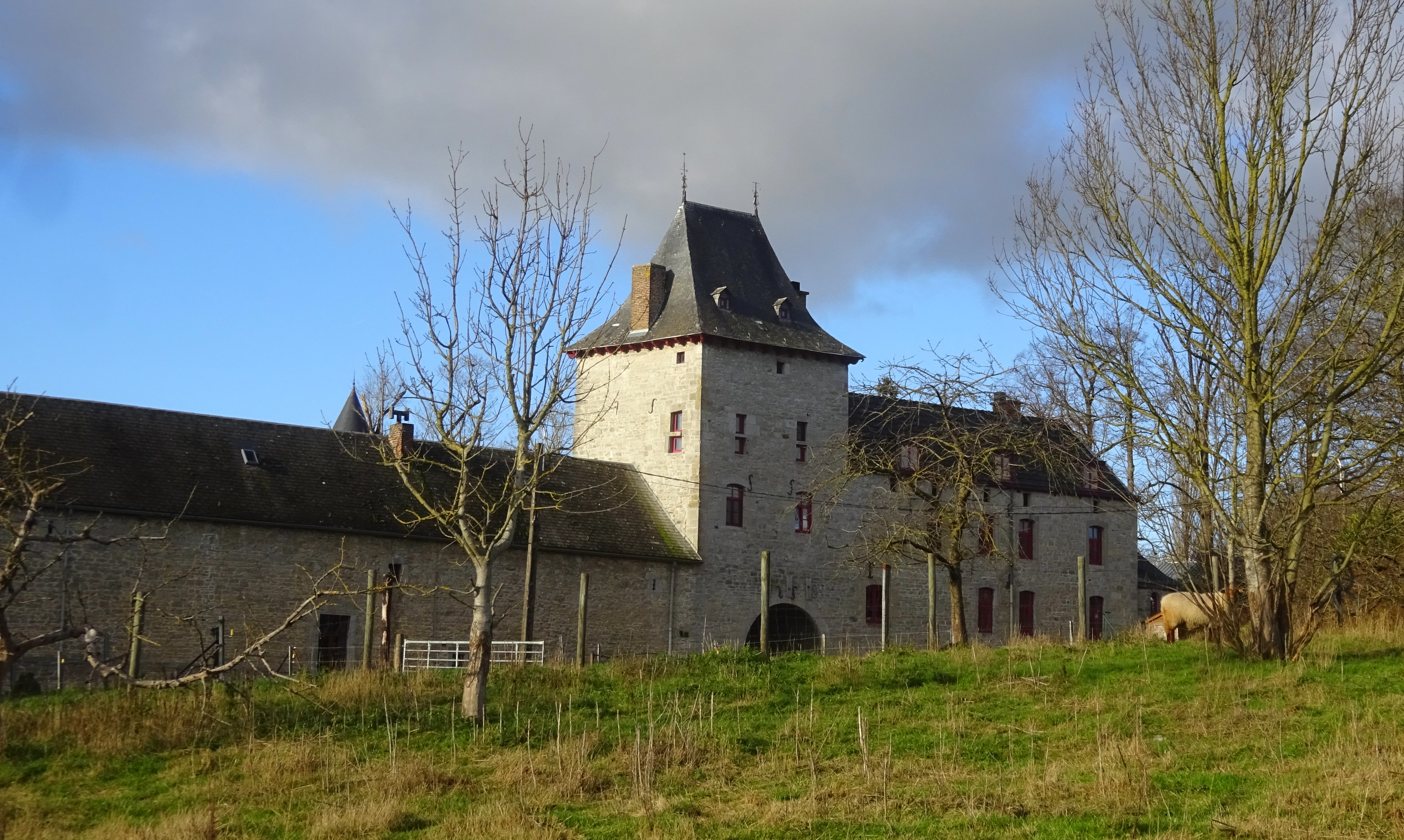
The manoir d’Ange

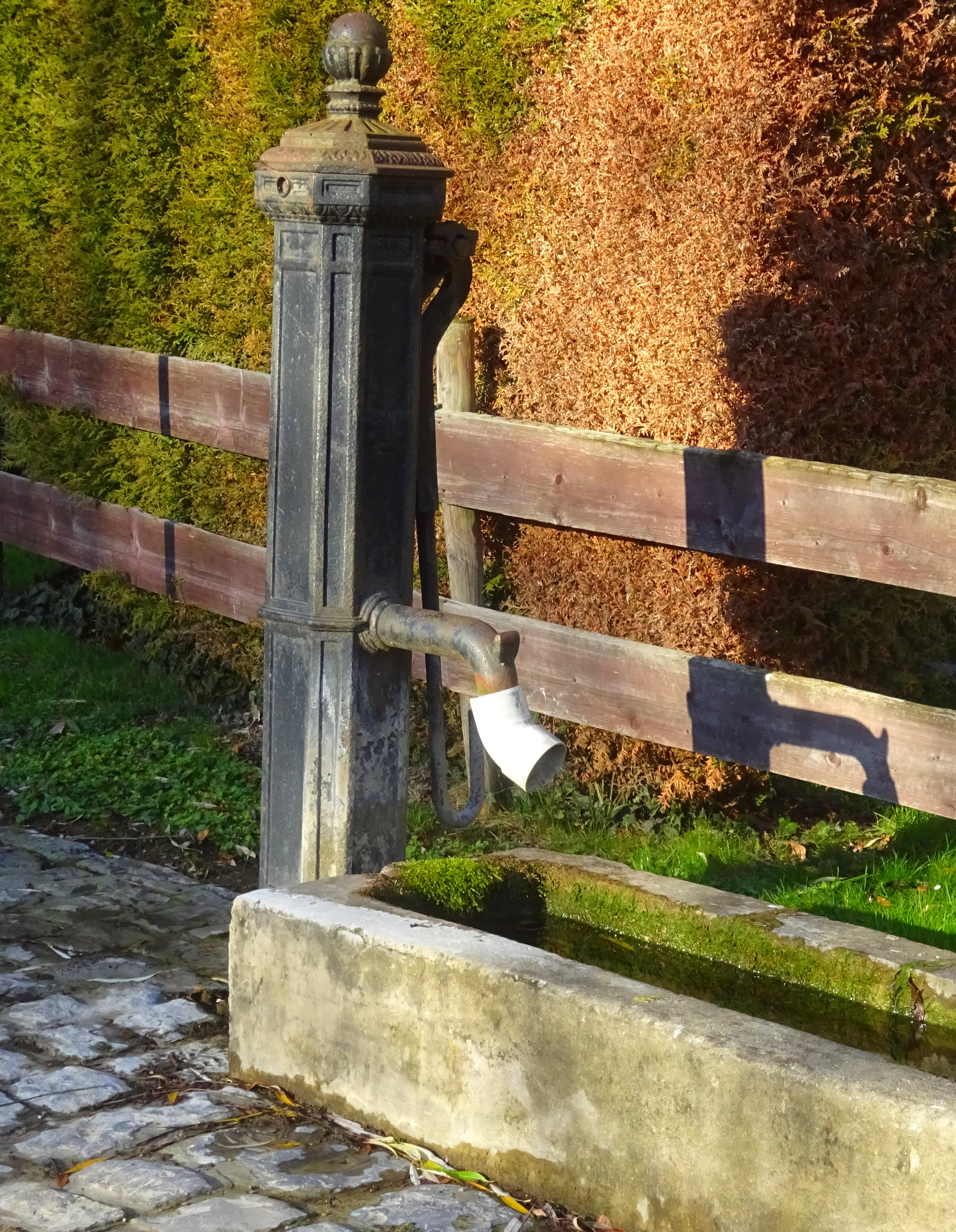
Water pump and first trough

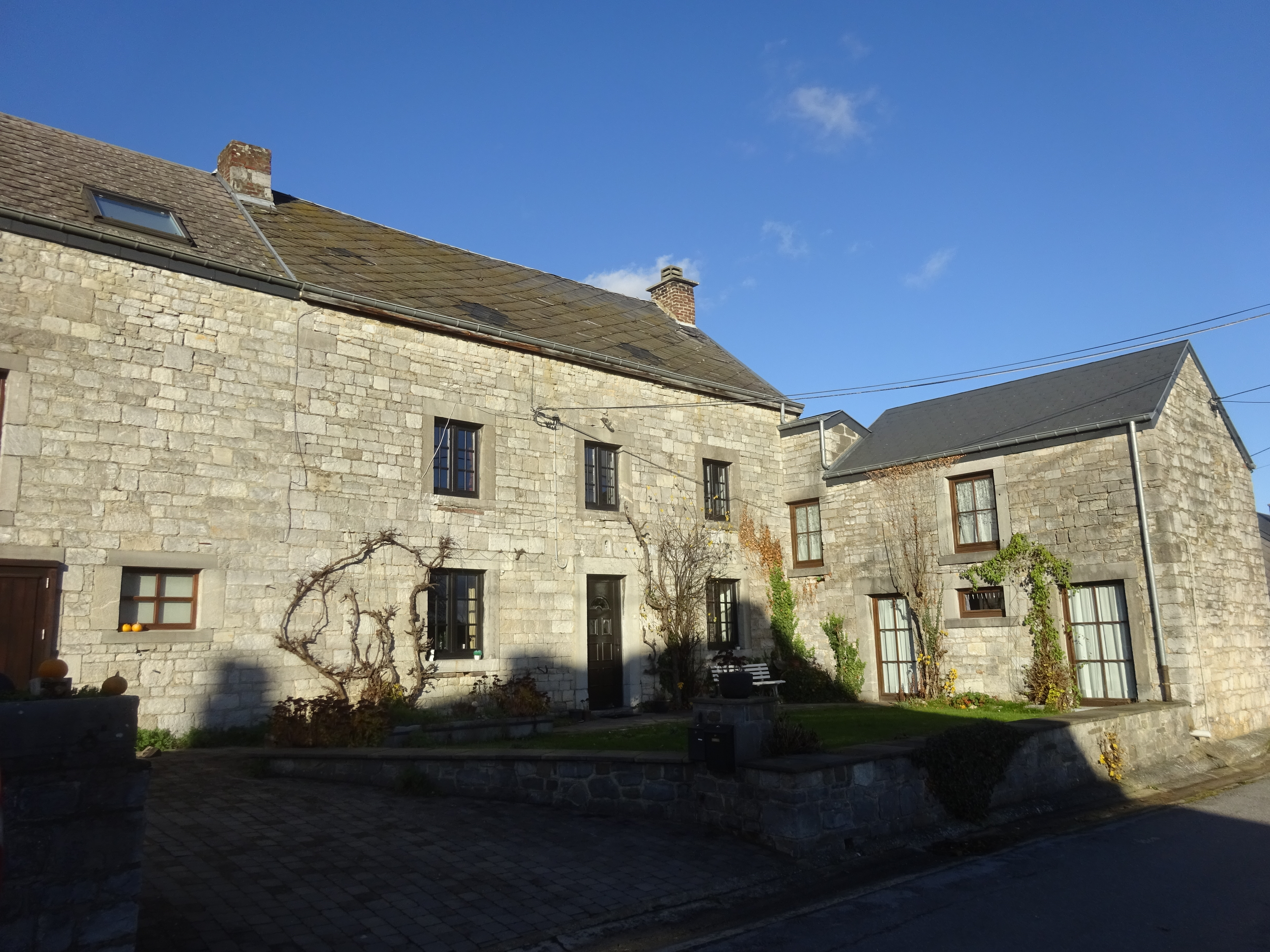
Sur le Mont farmhouse

== History ==
Mentioned as early as 874, My once belong to the abbey of Stavelot and was part of the territory of the county of Logne. Later, My was part of the duchy of Luxembourg (district of Durbuy).

My was a municipality in its own right before the Fusion of the Belgian municipalities in 1977. It was then part of the province of Luxembourg.

The parish of My is probably the original one of the Brisbois family in the 14th century. Ponsard (or Ponchard) Brisbois, known as the Old Wolf, was an ironmaster in Mormont at the beginning of the 15th century. His descendants included Adam Brisbois, who received the county of Laroche, Grégoire Brisbois, a gentleman buried in the church of Wéris, and Jehan Brisbois, bailiff of Givet.

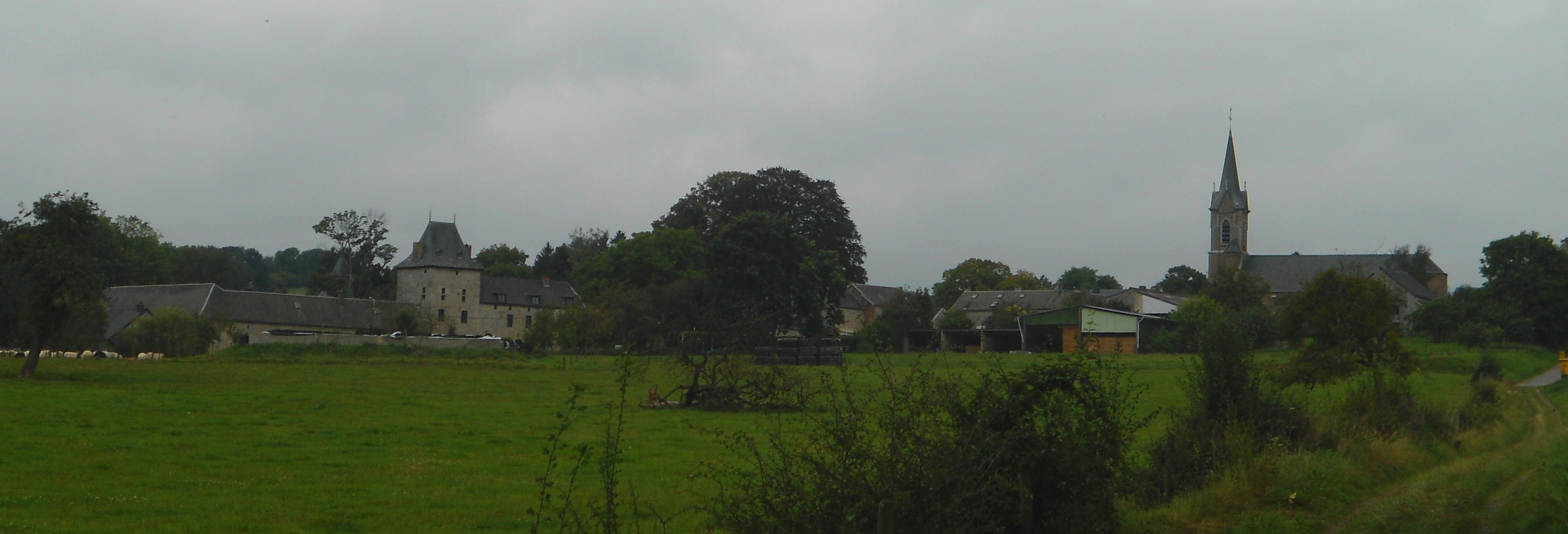
View of the village

== Notable people ==
- Victor Hubinon (1924–1979), cartoonist who died in My.

== Activities ==
Since 2004, the traditional spring market is held every 1 May.

The village has several country cottages, and bed and breakfasts.

== See also ==
- List of protected heritage sites in Ferrières, Belgium
