= Ferrières, Belgium =

Municipality in Liège Province, Wallonia, Belgium

Ferrières: Ferire (Walloon)
- Municipality
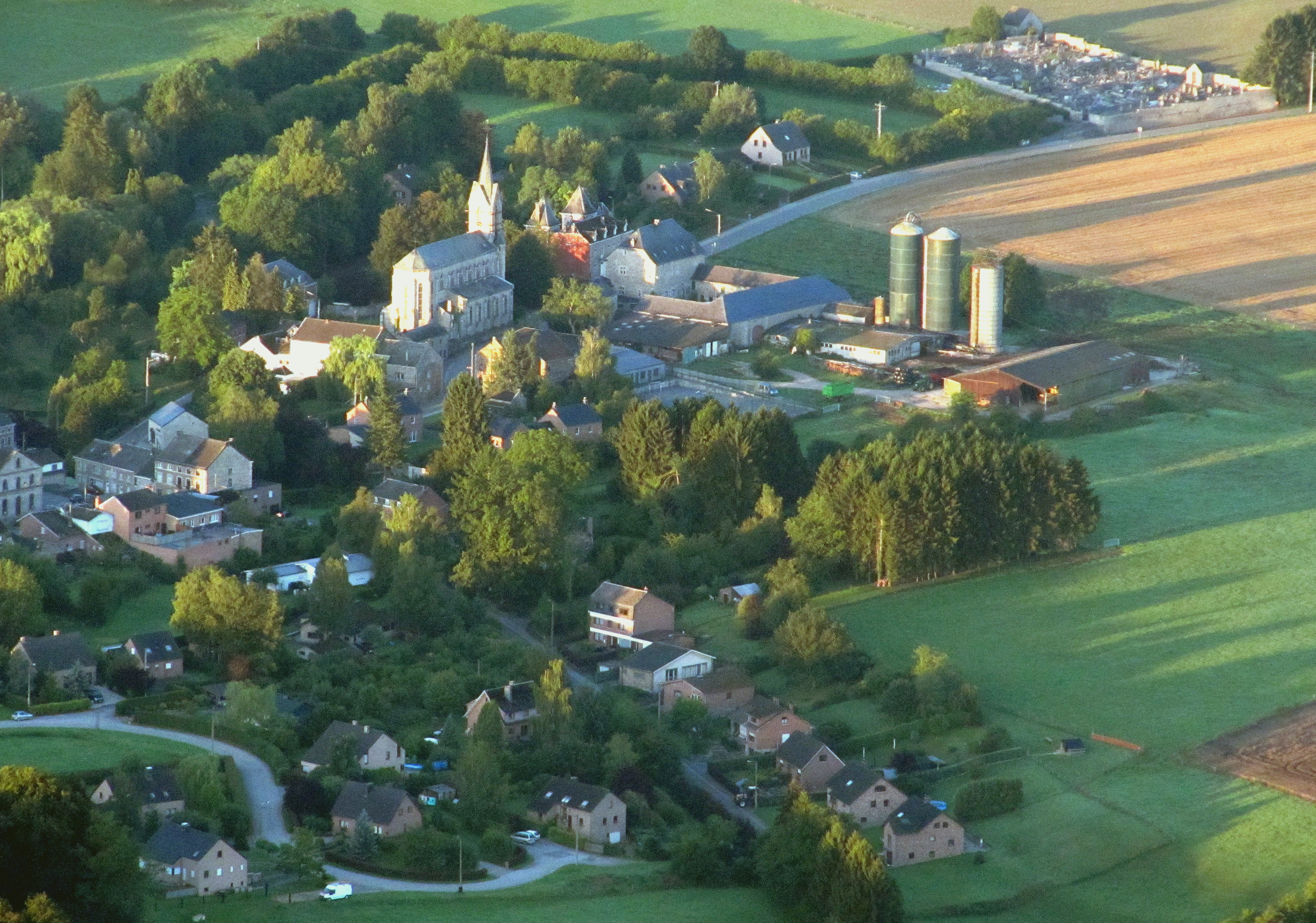

- Flag Coat of arms

- Location of Ferrières in the province of Liège
- Interactive map of Ferrières
- Location in Belgium
- Coordinates: 50°24′N 05°36′E
- Country: Belgium
- Community: French Community
- Region: Wallonia
- Province: Liège
- Arrondissement: Huy

Government
  - Mayor: Frédéric LEONARD (RpF)
  - Governing party: RpF

Area
  - Total: 57.06 km^{2} (22.03 sq mi)

Population (2018-01-01)
  - Total: 4,918
  - Density: 86.19/km^{2} (223.2/sq mi)
- Postal codes: 4190
- NIS code: 61019
- Area codes: 086 and 04
- Website: www.ferrieres.be

Ferrières (French pronunciation: [fɛʁjɛʁ]; Walloon: Ferire) is a municipality of Wallonia located in the province of Liège, Belgium.

On January 1, 2006, Ferrières had a total population of 4,449. The total area is 56.90 km^{2} with a population density of 78 inhabitants per km^{2}.

The municipality consists of the following districts: Ferrières, My (pronounced "Mee"), Vieuxville (including the hamlet of Sy), Werbomont, and Xhoris.

== See also ==
- List of protected heritage sites in Ferrières, Belgium
