= Sy, Belgium =

Sy
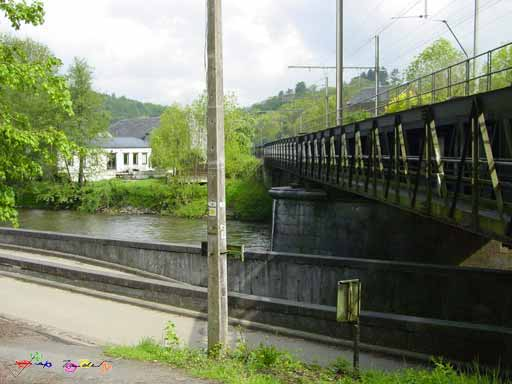
- Bridge over the Ourthe near Sy
- Interactive map of Sy
- Coordinates: 50°24′17″N 5°31′28″E
- Country: Belgium
- Region: Wallonia
- Province: Liège
- Municipality: Ferrières

Sy is a village of Wallonia in the municipality of Ferrières, district of Vieuxville, located in the province of Liège, Belgium.

It is located in the Famenne and lays south of the city of Liège in the Belgian Ardennes near the Ourthe. This is also the village where the Belgian painter Richard Heintz (1871-1929) made some of his paintings and later died.

== Tourism ==
Due to the village's close location to the Ourthe river, river tourism has become the most precious income to Sy. The village has a train station which runs along line 43. Most of its tourism comes from sport activities by the river such as canoeing, but hikes and climbing are also popular activities.

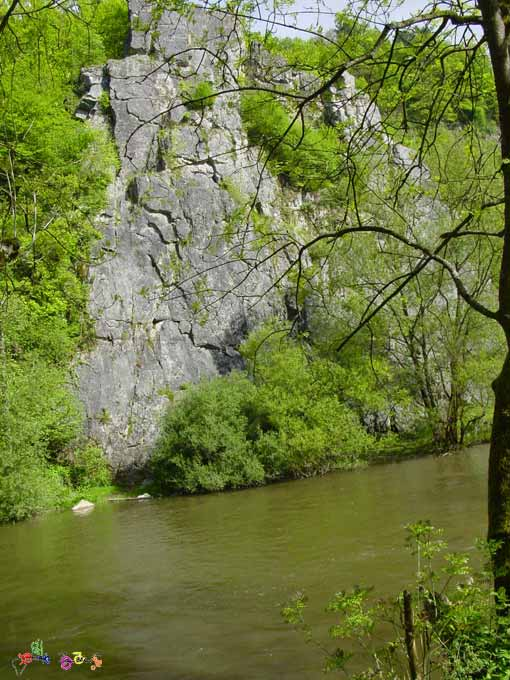
Rocks in the Ourthe near Sy

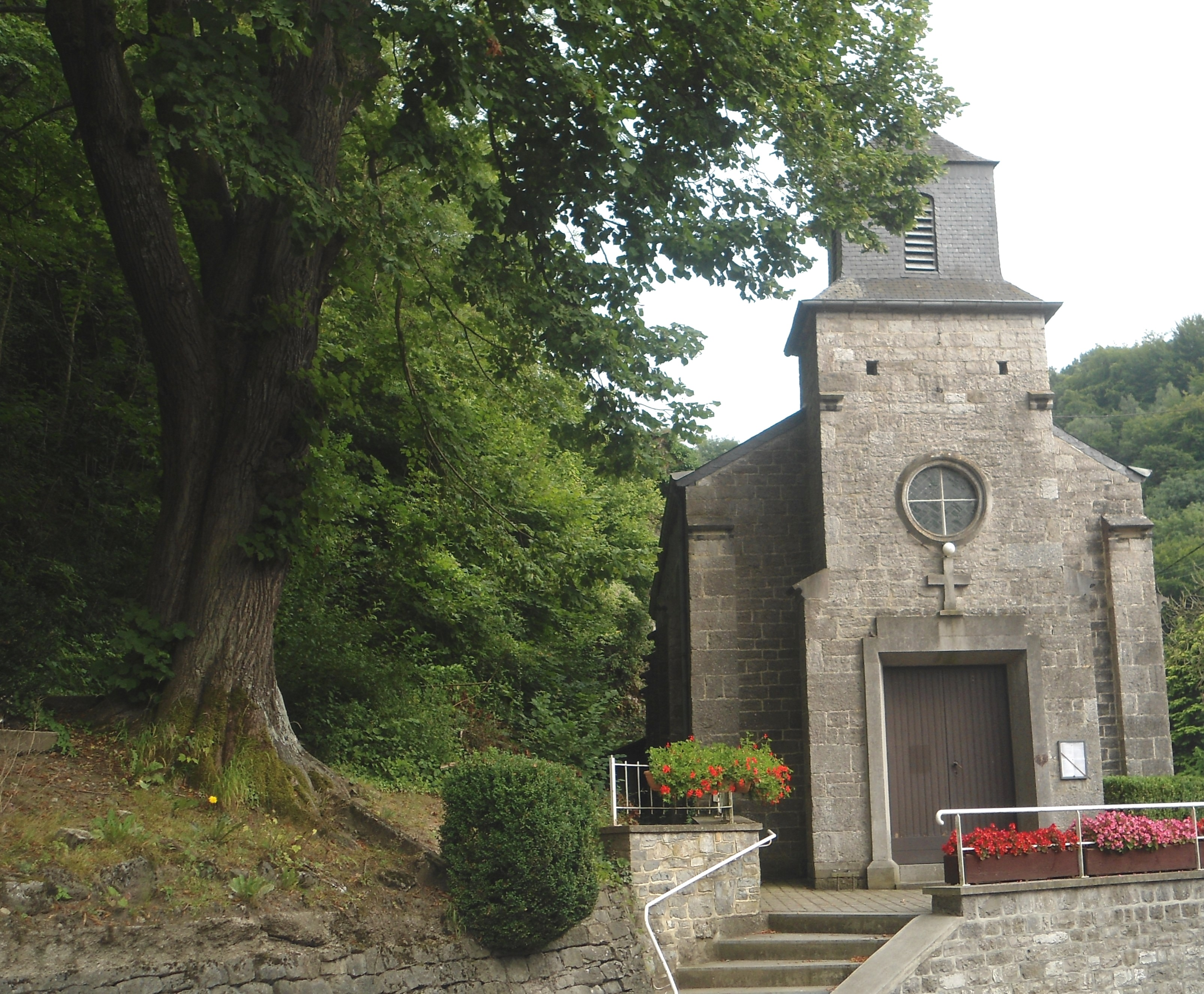
Church of our Holy Lady

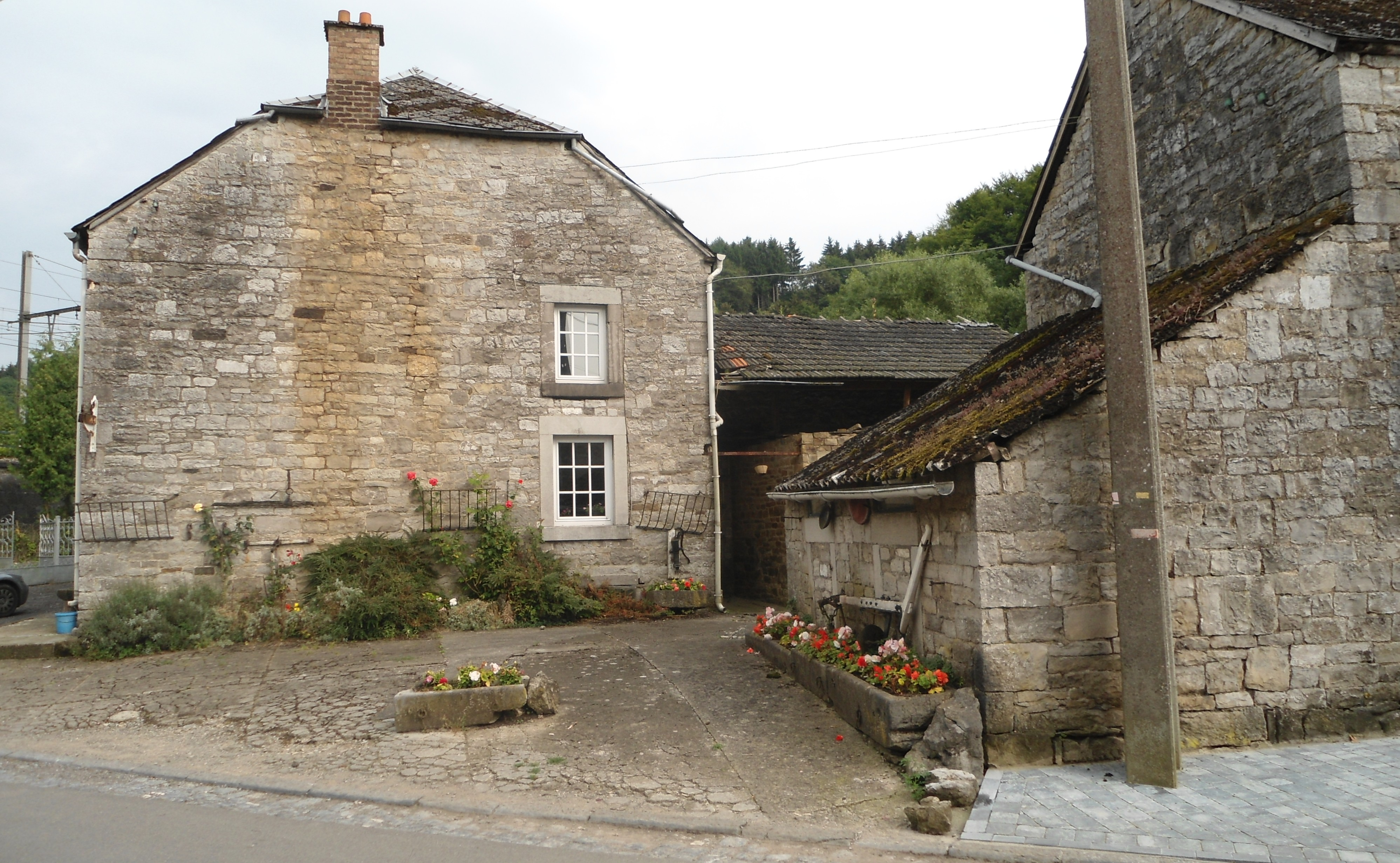
Houses in Sy

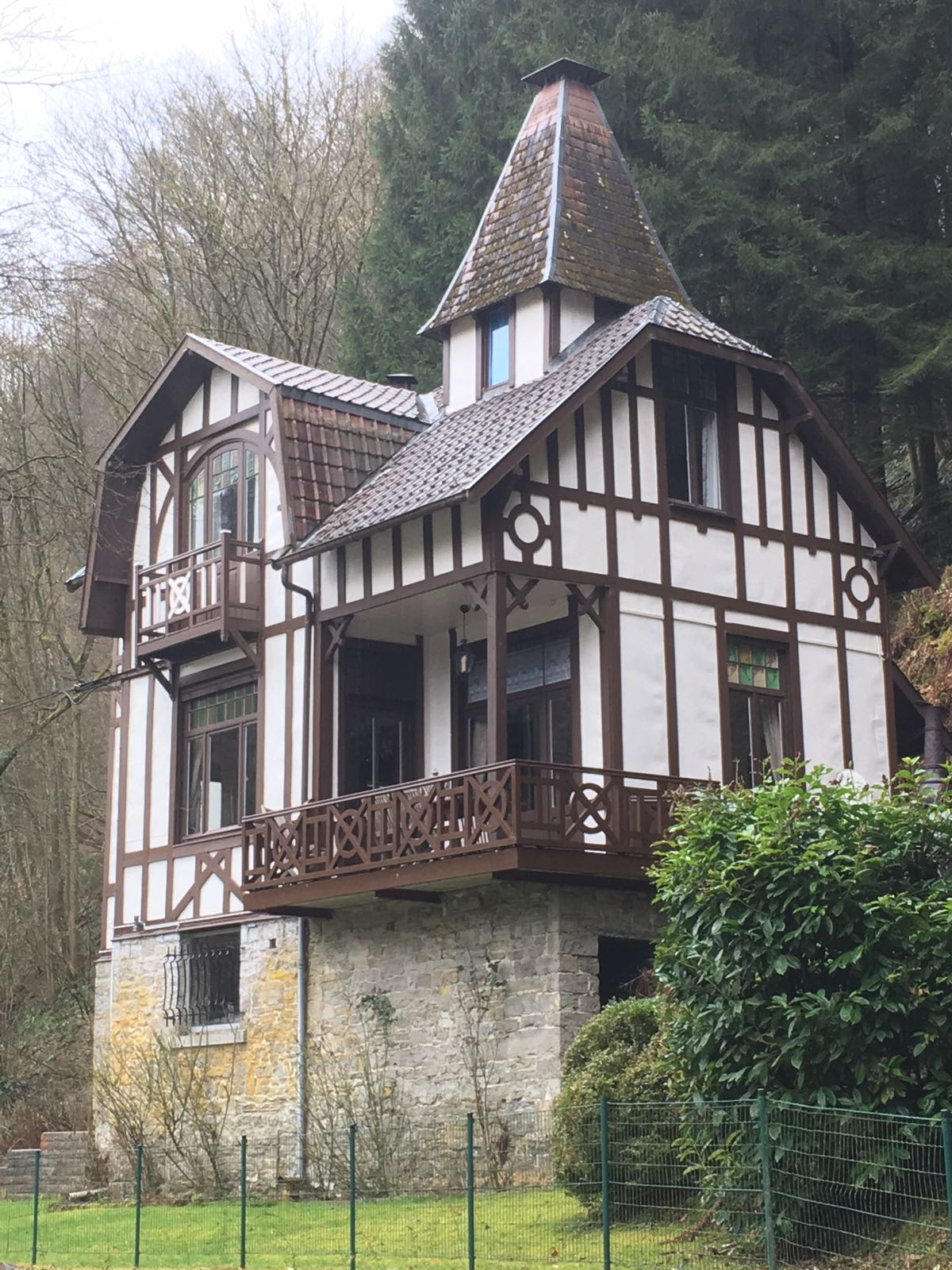
Home of Richard Heintz (1871-1929), Chemin de Sy 32, Verleine sur Ourthe
