= No, Denmark =

No
- Village
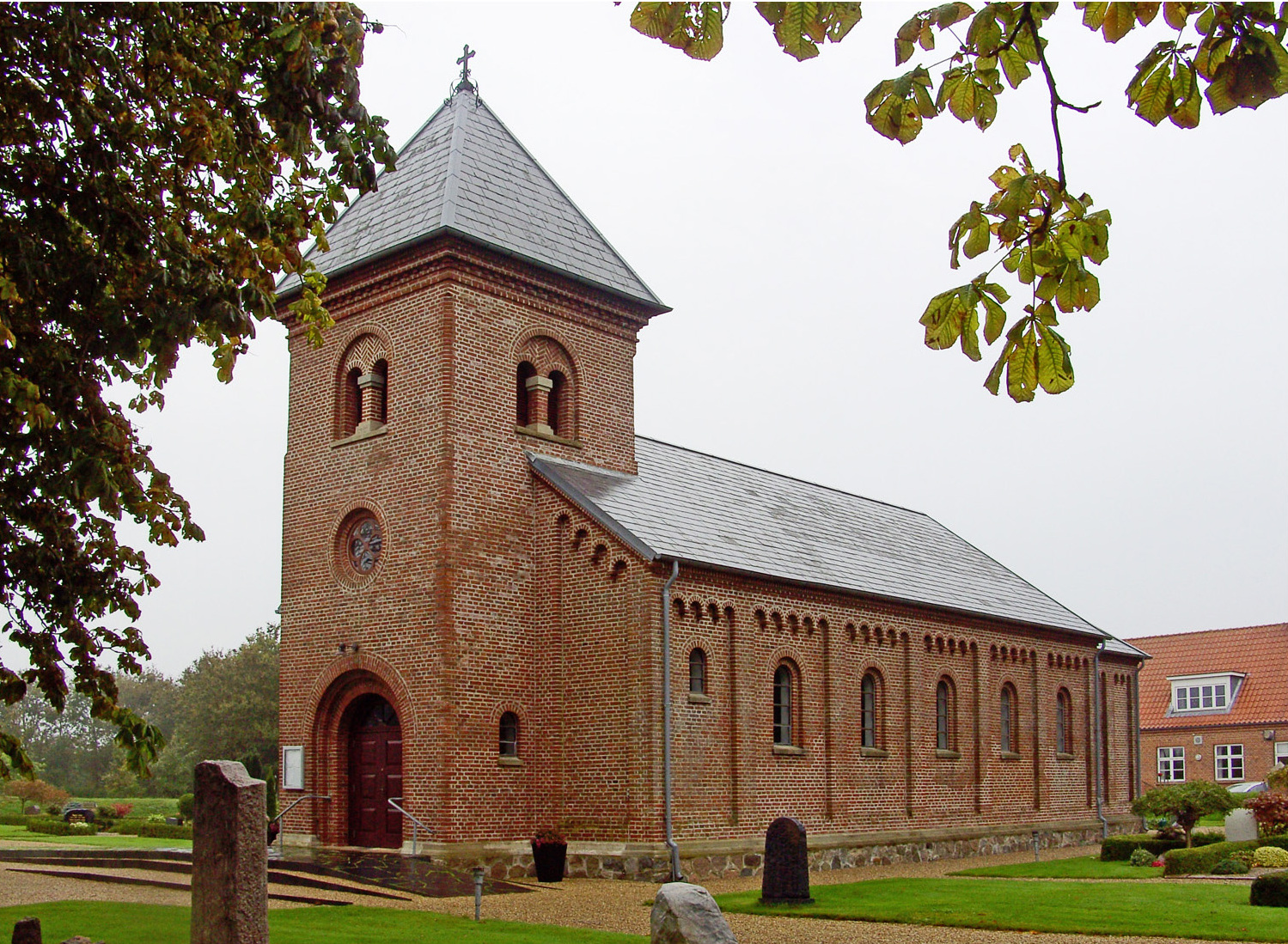
- No Church

- Location within Central Denmark Region Location within Denmark
- Coordinates: 56°6′42″N 8°19′5″E
- Country: Denmark
- Region: Central Denmark (Midtjylland)
- Municipality: Ringkøbing-Skjern

Population (2026)
  - Total: 242

No is a small village in Ringkøbing-Skjern Municipality, Central Denmark Region in Denmark. It is located 6 km northeast of Ringkøbing.

No Church, located in the village, was built in 1877.

== See also ==
- List of short place names
