= TB, Maryland =

- Unincorporated community
- Location within the state of Maryland TB, Maryland (the United States)
- Coordinates: 38°42′04″N 76°52′28″W
- Country: United States of America
- State: Maryland
- County: Prince George's
- Elevation: 236 ft (72 m)
- Time zone: UTC-5 (Eastern (EST))
  - Summer (DST): UTC-4 (EDT)
- GNIS feature ID: 598145

TB is an unincorporated community in Prince George's County, in the U.S. state of Maryland, near the intersection of highways MD 5 and US 301.

== History ==
A post office called T.B. was established in 1860, and remained in operation until 1914. So Thomas Brooke, an early settler owned this land and it was the border symbolized with his initials, while others believe partners William Townshend and Mr. Brooke each etched his respective last initial into stone at the original town site. TB has been noted for its unusually short place name.
