= Ed, Kentucky =

Ed
- Unincorporated community
- Location within the state of Kentucky Ed (the United States)
- Coordinates: 37°22′24″N 85°2′34″W
- Country: United States
- State: Kentucky
- County: Casey
- Elevation: 1,184 ft (361 m)
- Time zone: UTC-5 (Eastern (EST))
  - Summer (DST): UTC-4 (EST)
- GNIS feature ID: 2568375

Ed was an unincorporated community in Casey County, Kentucky, United States.

Ed has been noted for its short place name.

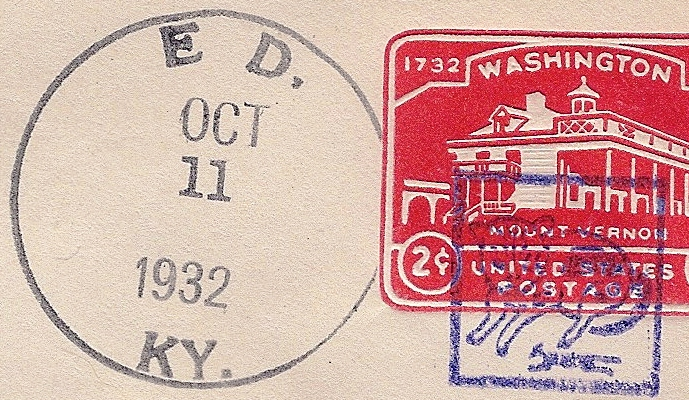
