= Ø, Denmark =

Coordinates: 56°27′32″N 9°37′57″E

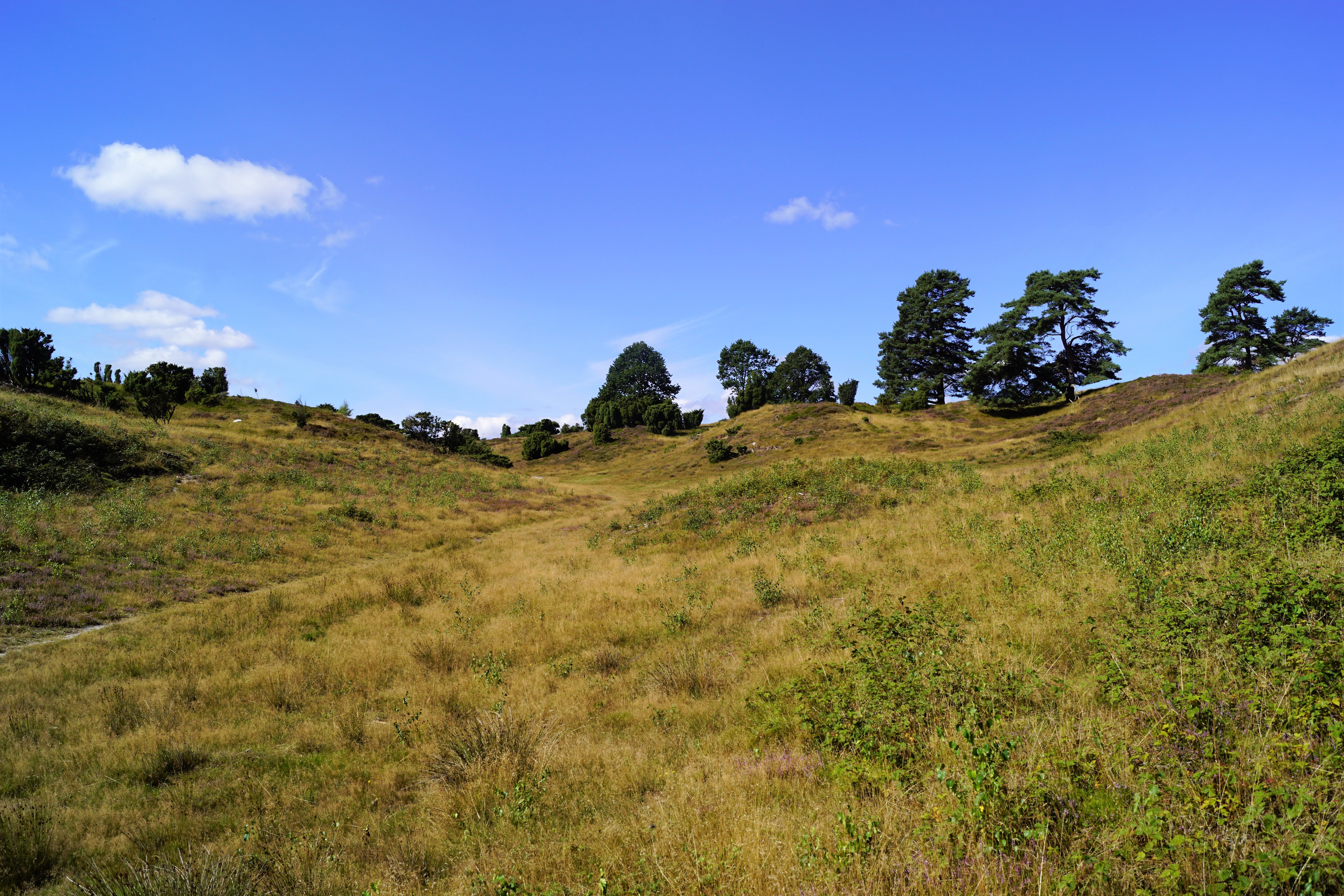
Ø Bakker as seen from north of Øby

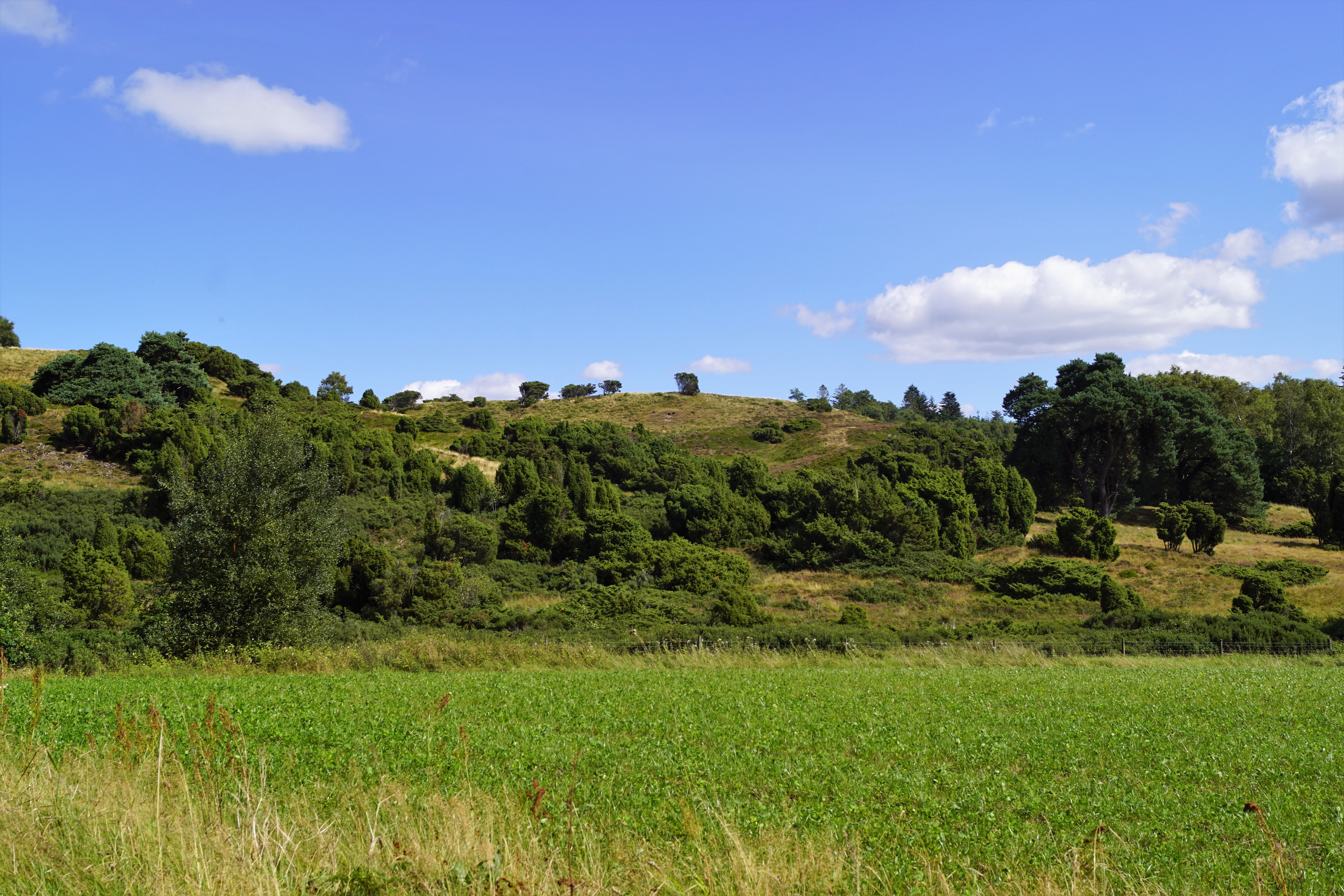
Ø Bakker as seen from the southwest

Ø Bakker, or simply Ø (lit. 'Island'), is a piece of land in the valley of the Nørreå in the eastern part of Jutland, Denmark. Its name means island hills and probably comes from the isolated appearance of this piece of land, much like an island of hills surrounded by meadows.

According to legend, King Dan of Denmark, the legendary king of Denmark and the namesake of the nation of Denmark, is buried at Ø. In 1975, an area of 285 hectares in Ø was given the status of nature reserve due to its abundance of vegetation, butterflies, and insects.

== See also ==
- List of short place names

== Sources ==
=== Danish sites ===
- Viborg amt's official site on Nørreå
- The Ø hills on fugleognatur.dk
- Nørreå valley on skovognatur.dk
- Regional geology and topography
