= Saint-Remy-en-Bouzemont-Saint-Genest-et-Isson =

- Commune
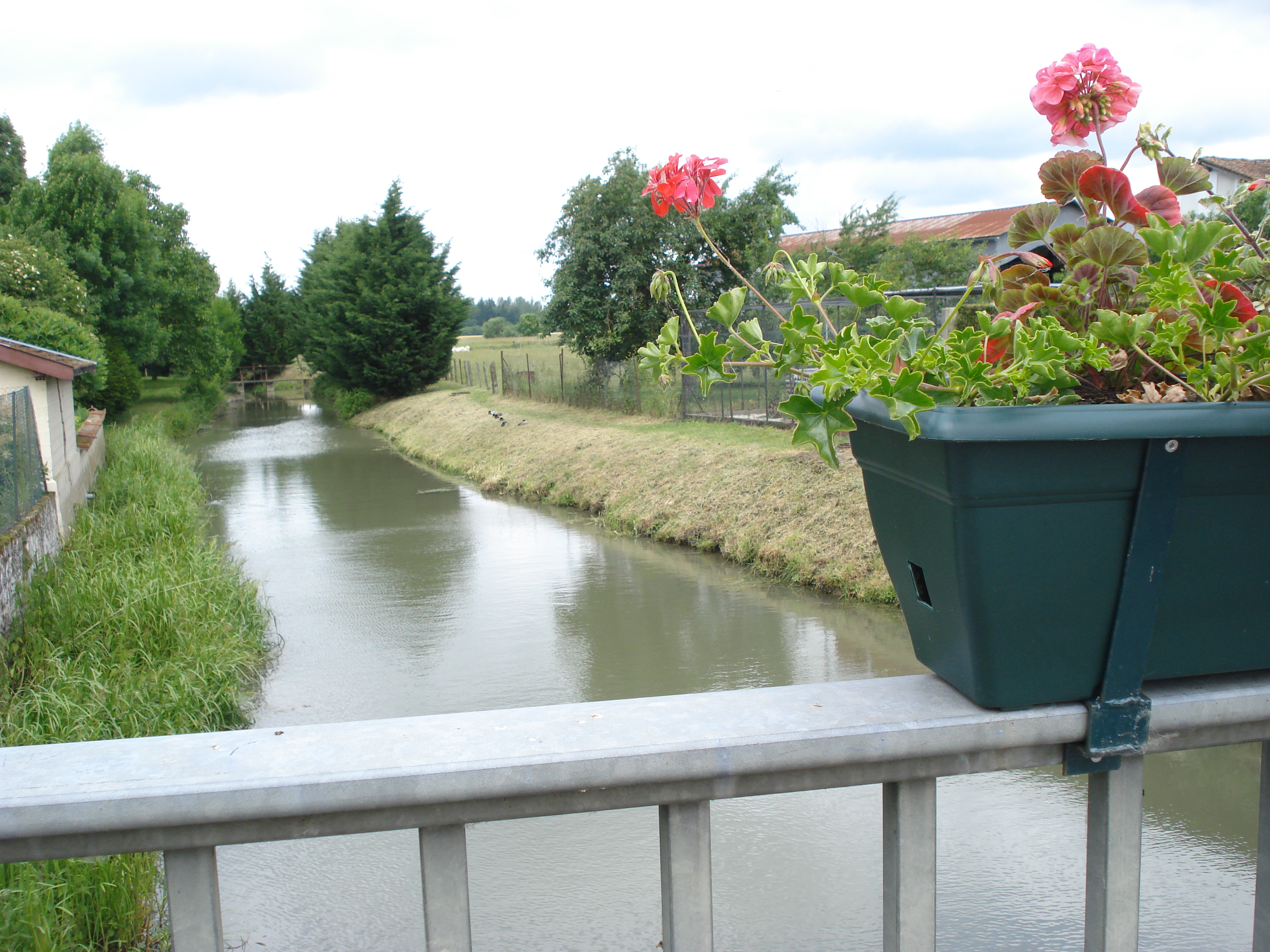
- The Isson river in Saint-Remy-en-Bouzemont-Saint-Genest-et-Isson

- Coat of arms
- Location of Saint-Remy-en-Bouzemont-Saint-Genest-et-Isson
- Location within France Location within Grand Est
- Coordinates: 48°37′50″N 4°38′48″E
- Country: France
- Region: Grand Est
- Department: Marne
- Arrondissement: Vitry-le-François
- Canton: Sermaize-les-Bains

Government
  - Mayor (2020–2026): Sylvian Valota
- Area^{1}: 21.85 km^{2} (8.44 sq mi)
- Elevation: 110 m (360 ft)
- Population (2023): 470
  - Density: 22/km^{2} (56/sq mi)
- Time zone: UTC+01:00 (CET)
  - Summer (DST): UTC+02:00 (CEST)
- INSEE/Postal code: 51513 /51290
- ^{1} French Land Register data, which excludes lakes, ponds, glaciers > 1 km^{2} (0.386 sq mi or 247 acres) and river estuaries.

Saint-Remy-en-Bouzemont-Saint-Genest-et-Isson (French pronunciation: [sɛ̃ ʁemi ɑ̃ buzmɔ̃ sɛ̃ ʒənɛ e isɔ̃]) is a commune in the Marne department in north-eastern France.

It is the commune in France with the longest name.

== See also ==
- Communes of the Marne department
- List of long place names
- Y, Somme, the shortest place name in France
