= Uz, Kentucky =

Unincorporated community in Kentucky, United States

- Unincorporated community
- Location in Kentucky Location in the United States
- Coordinates: 37°7′9″N 82°53′7″W
- Country: United States
- State: Kentucky
- County: Letcher
- Elevation: 1,125 ft (343 m)
- Time zone: UTC-5 (Eastern (EST))
  - Summer (DST): UTC-4 (EDT)
- GNIS feature ID: 2336227

Uz was an unincorporated community in Letcher County, Kentucky, United States. Despite the appearance that it would rhyme with "buzz", the area was a mining camp for the U Z Mines, and is pronounced "you-zee". Uz has been noted for its short name. A competing explanation for the place name is given from railroad origins. W. S. Morton of the Louisville & Nashville Railroad stated that it took the patience of Job to deal with local property owners and should be named after the biblical home of Job “Uz wuz.”
