= Ai River =

Ai River may refer to:

- Love River (Chinese: 愛河; pinyin: Ài Hé), a Taiwanese canal
- Ai River (Gifu), Japan
- Ai River (Dandong), China

== See also ==
- Ai (disambiguation)
