= List of protected heritage sites in Ferrières, Belgium =

This table shows an overview of the protected heritage sites in the Walloon town Ferrières, Belgium. This list is part of Belgium's national heritage.

Object	Year/architect	Town/section	Address	Coordinates	Number^{?}	Image
Farmhouse ^{(nl)} ^{(fr)}		Ferrières	Au Clocher n°14	50.399421°N 5.602919°E	61019-CLT-0001-01 Info	
Bernardfagne cloister ^{(nl)} ^{(fr)}		Ferrières	allée de Bernardfagne n°7	50.423545°N 5.634242°E	61019-CLT-0002-01 Info	
Rocks of Sy ^{(nl)} ^{(fr)}		Ferrières		50.398010°N 5.535896°E	61019-CLT-0003-01 Info	Rotsen van Sy
Fort Logne ruins ^{(nl)} ^{(fr)}		Ferrières		50.396857°N 5.532037°E	61019-CLT-0004-01 Info	Ruïnes van het fort van Logne en omgeving
Choir of the church of St. Pierre and Paul de Vieuxvilles, now chapel of the cemetery ^{(nl)} ^{(fr)}		Ferrières	Vieuxville	50.395423°N 5.550537°E	61019-CLT-0005-01 Info	Het koor van de oude kerk Saints-Pierre-et-Paul de Vieuxvilles, omgevormd tot kerkhofkapel
Farmhouse Bouverie ^{(nl)} ^{(fr)}		Ferrières	rue de la Bouverie, n°1 (M) et alentours (S)	50.394523°N 5.549598°E	61019-CLT-0006-01 Info	
house ^{(nl)} ^{(fr)}		Ferrières		50.391796°N 5.679260°E	61019-CLT-0007-01 Info	
Linden tree of Lognards ^{(nl)} ^{(fr)}		Ferrières		50.447824°N 5.597218°E	61019-CLT-0010-01 Info	De linde van Lognards
Castle Fanson ^{(nl)} ^{(fr)}		Ferrières		50.454663°N 5.620037°E	61019-CLT-0011-01 Info	Kasteel van Fanson n°1 en het ensemble van het kasteel en zijn directe omgeving
Chapel St. Barbe ^{(nl)} ^{(fr)}		Ferrières		50.381904°N 5.634097°E	61019-CLT-0012-01 Info	
Chapel St. Barbe ^{(nl)} ^{(fr)}		Ferrières		50.382342°N 5.635911°E	61019-CLT-0013-01 Info	
Rocks of Vierge and the valley of Bléron ^{(nl)} ^{(fr)}		Ferrières		50.444436°N 5.563373°E	61019-CLT-0015-01 Info	Rotsen van Vierge en de vallei van Bléron
Frescoes in Roman chapel of St. Pierre and Paul ^{(nl)} ^{(fr)}		Ferrières	Vieuxville	50.395423°N 5.550537°E	61019-PEX-0001-01 Info	De muurschilderingen (circa 1500) van de romaanse kapel Saints-Pierre-et-Paul

== See also ==
- List of protected heritage sites in Liège (province)
