= Vieuxville =

- Ruins of the Château de Logne in Vieuxville

- Location within Belgium Location within Europe
- Coordinates: 50°23′48″N 05°33′07″E
- Country: Belgium
- Region: Wallonia
- Province: Liège
- Municipality: Ferrières

Vieuxville is a district of the municipality of Ferrières, located in the province of Liège in Wallonia, Belgium.

The settlement of Vieuxville grew up around the fortified castle Château de Logne, strategically located at the confluence of the Ourthe and Lembrée rivers. It formed part of the western defense of the Princely Abbey of Stavelot-Malmedy and was destroyed in 1521 during the war between Emperor Charles V and Francis I of France. The village of Vieuxville also contains some other historical buildings and a village church from 1881. There is also a well-preserved Romanesque chapel by the cemetery.

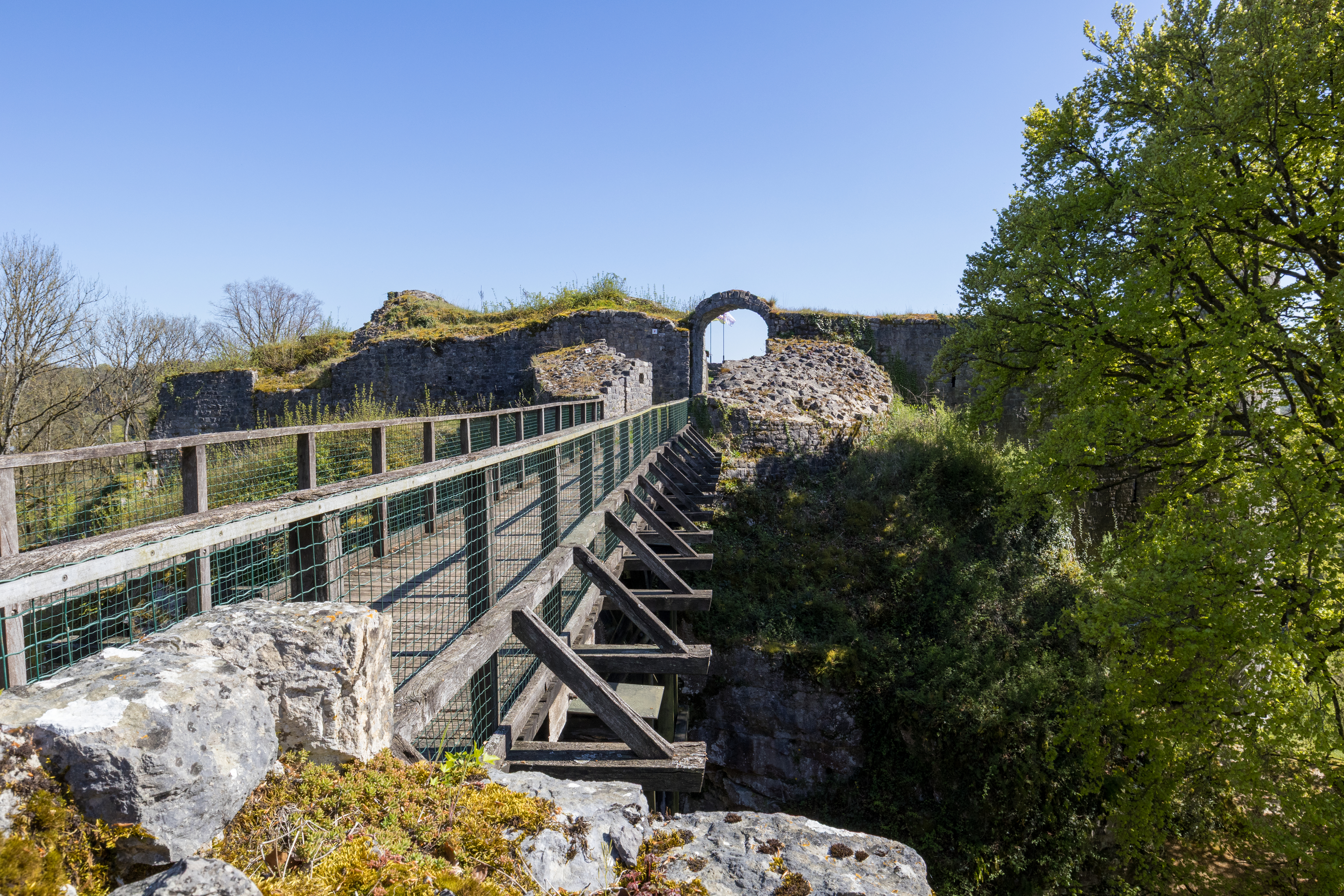

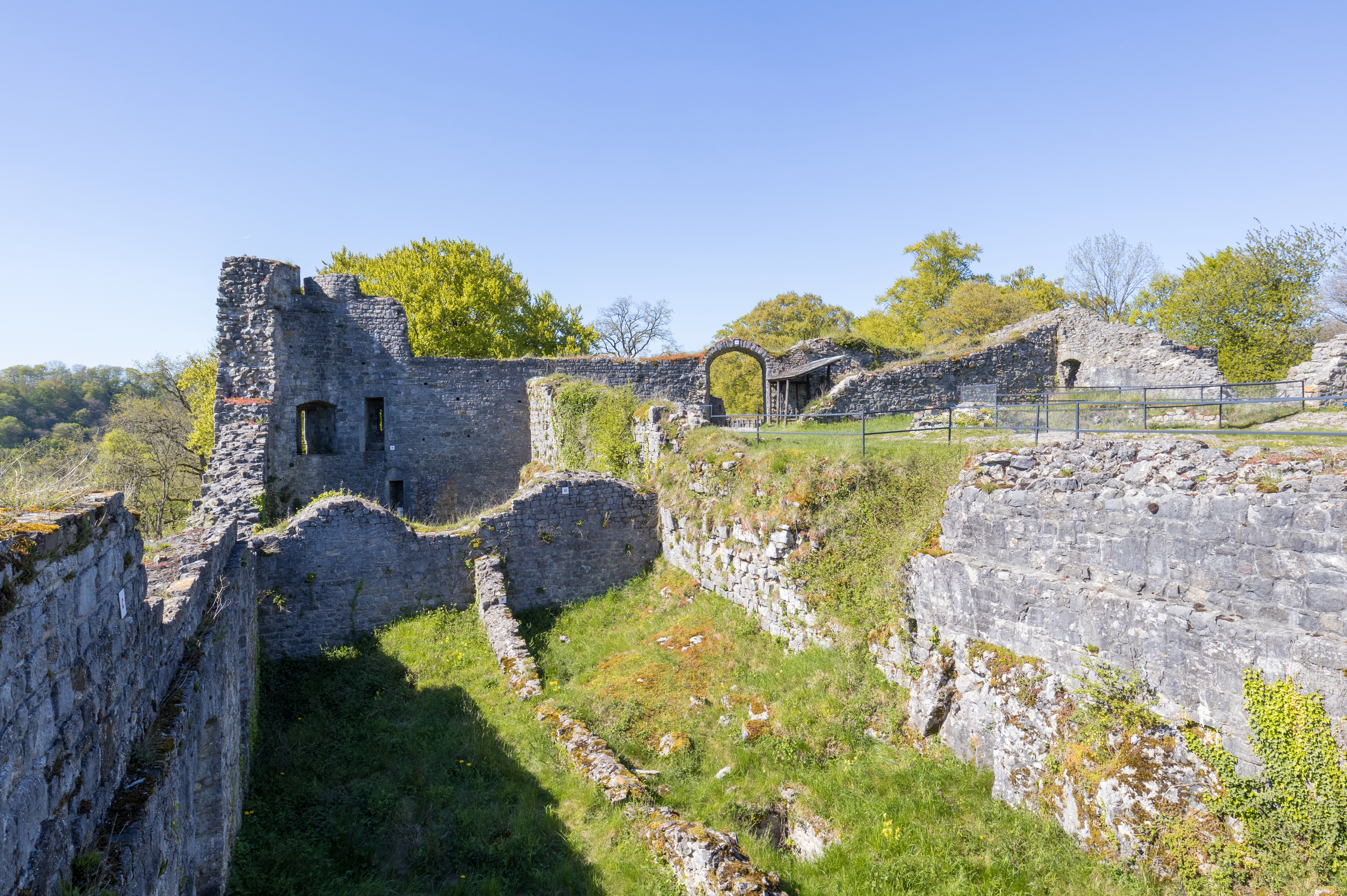
