= O K, Kentucky =

Unincorporated community in Kentucky, United States

- Unincorporated community
- Location in Kentucky Location in the United States
- Coordinates: 37°20′50″N 84°35′24″W
- Country: United States
- State: Kentucky
- County: Lincoln
- Elevation: 991 ft (302 m)
- Time zone: UTC-5 (Eastern (EST))
  - Summer (DST): UTC-4 (EDT)
- GNIS feature ID: 2566656

O K was an unincorporated community located in Lincoln County, Kentucky, United States. Their post office was established in February 1882 and closed in December 1942.
