= Ö, Sweden =

Ö
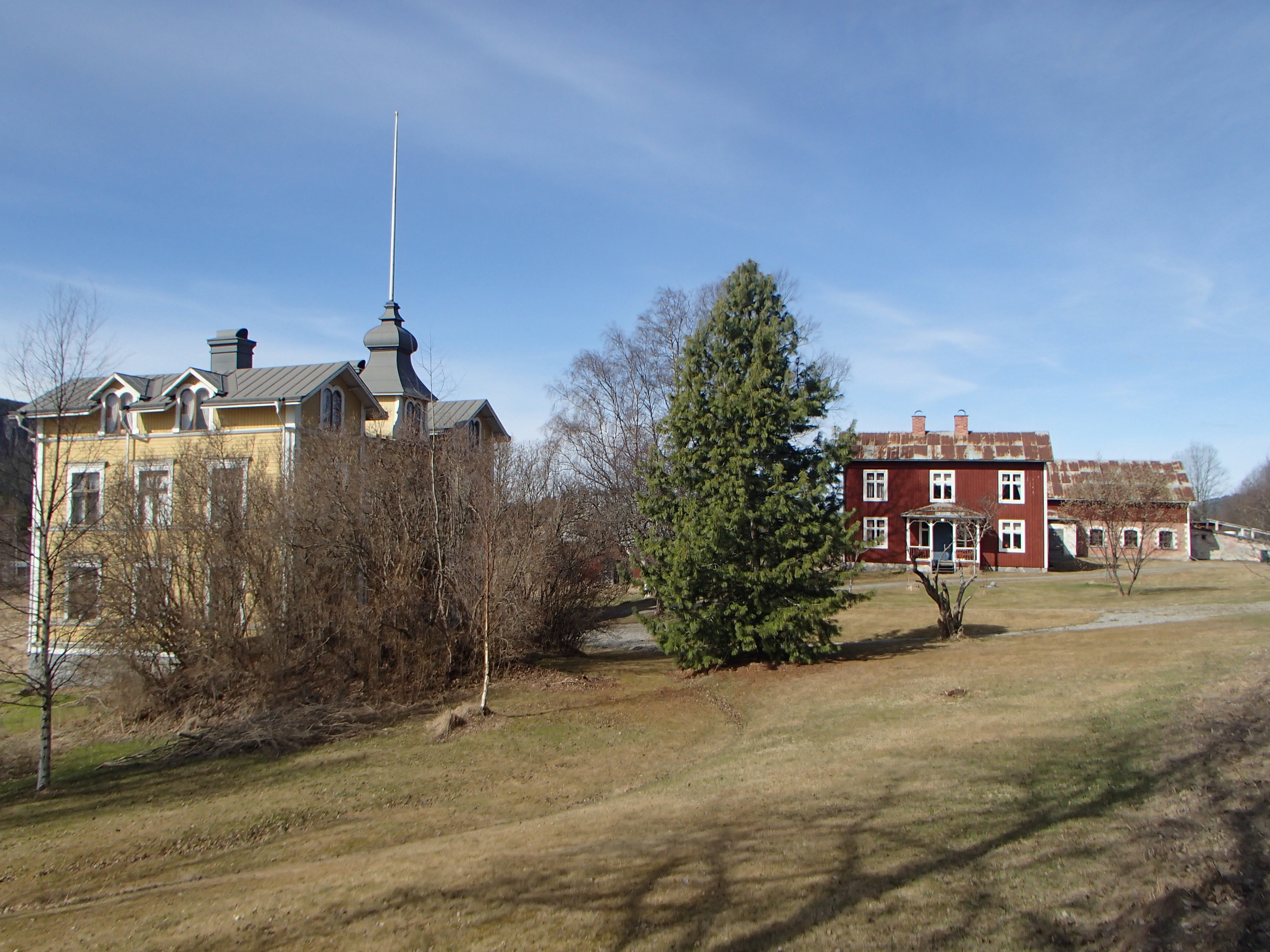

- Location within Västernorrland Location within Sweden
- Coordinates: 62°31′N 15°59′E
- Country: Sweden
- Province: Medelpad
- County: Västernorrland County
- Municipality: Ånge Municipality

Population (31 December 2010)
  - Total: 58
- Time zone: UTC+1 (CET)
  - Summer (DST): UTC+2 (CEST)

Ö is a locality situated in Ånge Municipality, Västernorrland County, Sweden with 90 inhabitants in 2015.

== See also ==
- List of short place names
