= Pi, Catalonia =

Pi
- Village
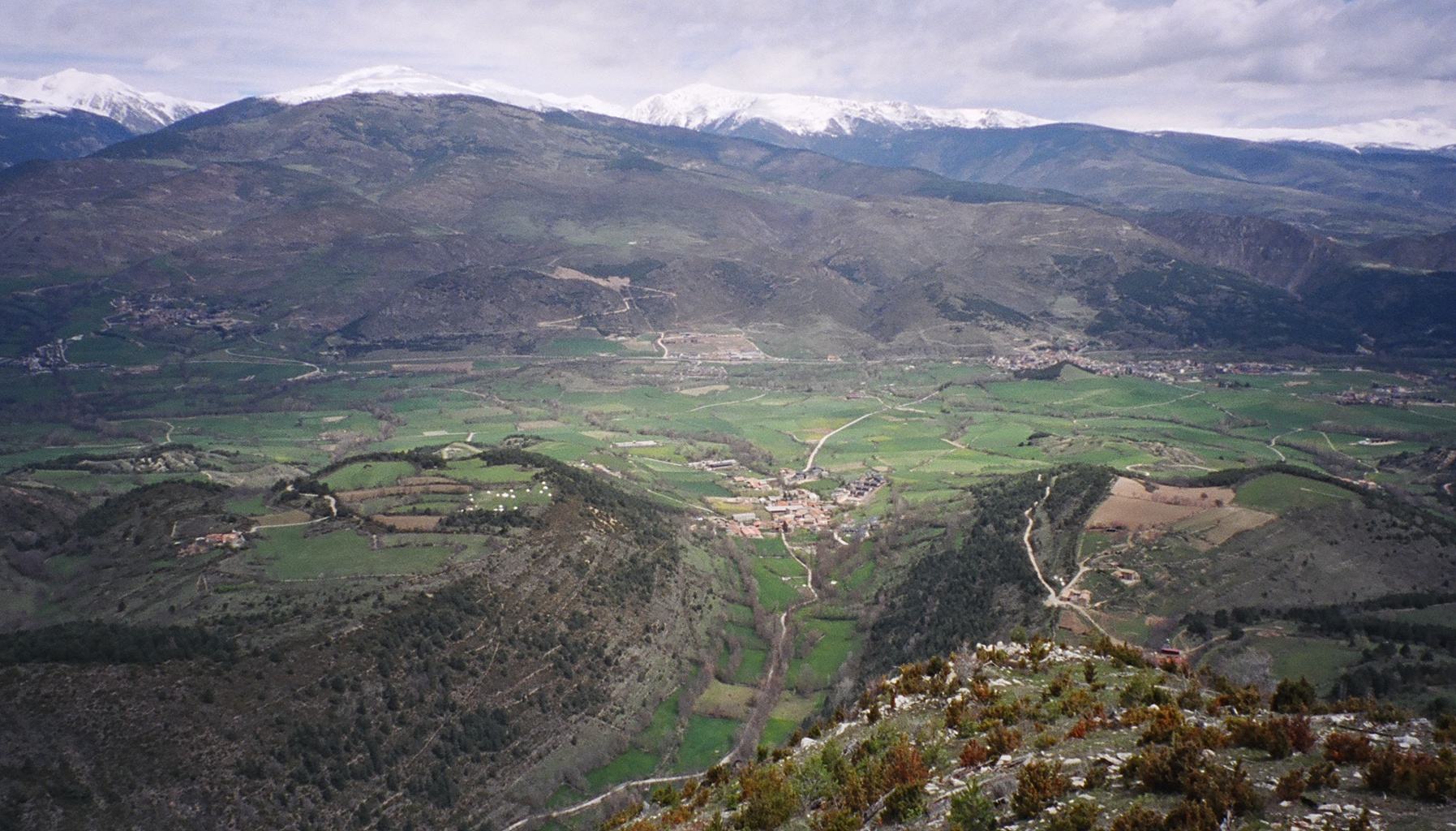

- Location in Catalonia Pi (Spain)
- Coordinates: 42°21′6″N 1°45′43″E
- Country: Spain
- Autonomous community: Catalonia
- Province: Lleida
- Vegueria: Alt Pirineu i Aran
- Comarca: Cerdanya
- Municipality: Bellver de Cerdanya
- Elevation: 1,075 m (3,527 ft)

Population (2018)
  - Total: 84
- Time zone: UTC+1 (CET)
  - Summer (DST): UTC+2 (CEST)
- Postal code: 25721
- Linguistic Predominance: Catalan

Pi is a small village belonging to the municipality of Bellver de Cerdanya, in the comarca of Cerdanya, vegueria of Alt Pirineu i Aran (Catalonia).
