= Sulfolactate sulfo-lyase =

(2R)-Sulfolactate sulfo-lyase

Identifiers
- EC no.: 4.4.1.24

Databases
- IntEnz: IntEnz view
- BRENDA: BRENDA entry
- ExPASy: NiceZyme view
- KEGG: KEGG entry
- MetaCyc: metabolic pathway
- PRIAM: profile
- PDB structures: RCSB PDB PDBe PDBsum
Search
- PMC: articles
- PubMed: articles
- NCBI: proteins

The enzyme (2R)-sulfolactate sulfo-lyase (EC 4.4.1.24) catalyzes the reaction

(2R)-3-sulfolactate $\rightleftharpoons$ pyruvate + hydrogensulfite

This enzyme belongs to the family of lyases, specifically the class of carbon-sulfur lyases. The systematic name of this enzyme class is (2R)-3-sulfolactate hydrogensulfite-lyase (pyruvate-forming). Other names in common use include Suy, SuyAB, and 3-sulfolactate bisulfite-lyase.
