= Oz, Kentucky =

Unincorporated community in Kentucky, United States

- Unincorporated community
- Location within Kentucky Location within the United States
- Coordinates: 36°42′23″N 84°34′03″W
- Country: United States
- State: Kentucky
- County: McCreary
- Elevation: 794 ft (242 m)
- Time zone: UTC-6 (Central (CST))
  - Summer (DST): UTC-5 (CST)
- GNIS feature ID: 514406

Oz is an unincorporated community and coal town located in McCreary County, Kentucky, United States.
