= Yu (Vychegda) =

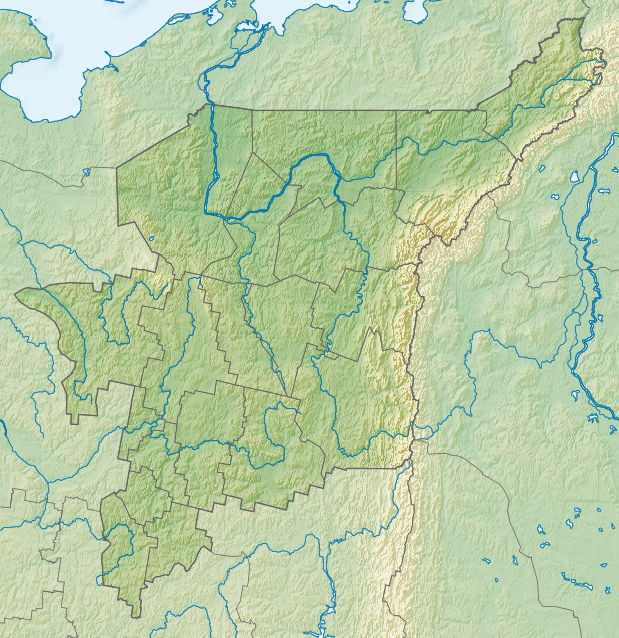
- Russia Komi Republic

Location
- Country: Russia

Physical characteristics
- Source
  - location: near Chasovo, the Komi Republic
- Mouth: Vychegda
  - coordinates: 62°00′17″N 50°38′45″E
- Length: about 10 km (6 mi)

Basin features
- Progression: Vychegda→ Northern Dvina→ White Sea

The Yu (Russian: Ю) is a river in northern Russia. It flows on the territory of the Komi Republic southeast in the upstream and southwest in the downstream from its source close to Chasovo, Komi.

The Yu flows into the Vychegda.
