= Y (commune) =

Commune in Hauts-de-France, France

- Commune
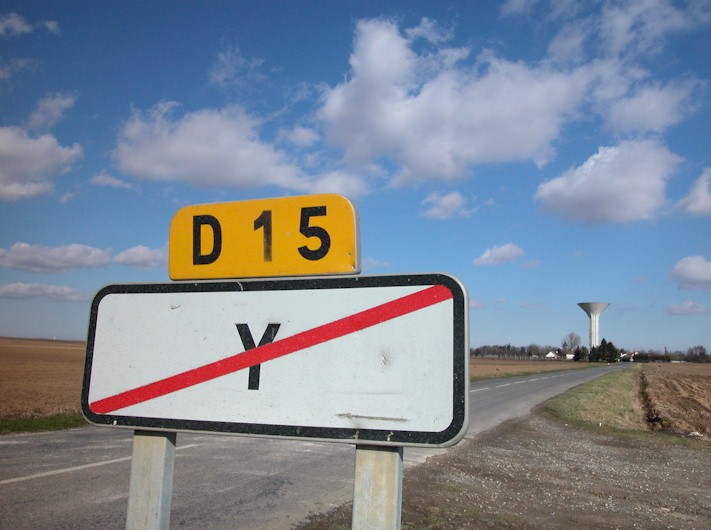
- Sign marking the exit of the village of Y in the Somme department of Hauts-de-France

- Coat of arms

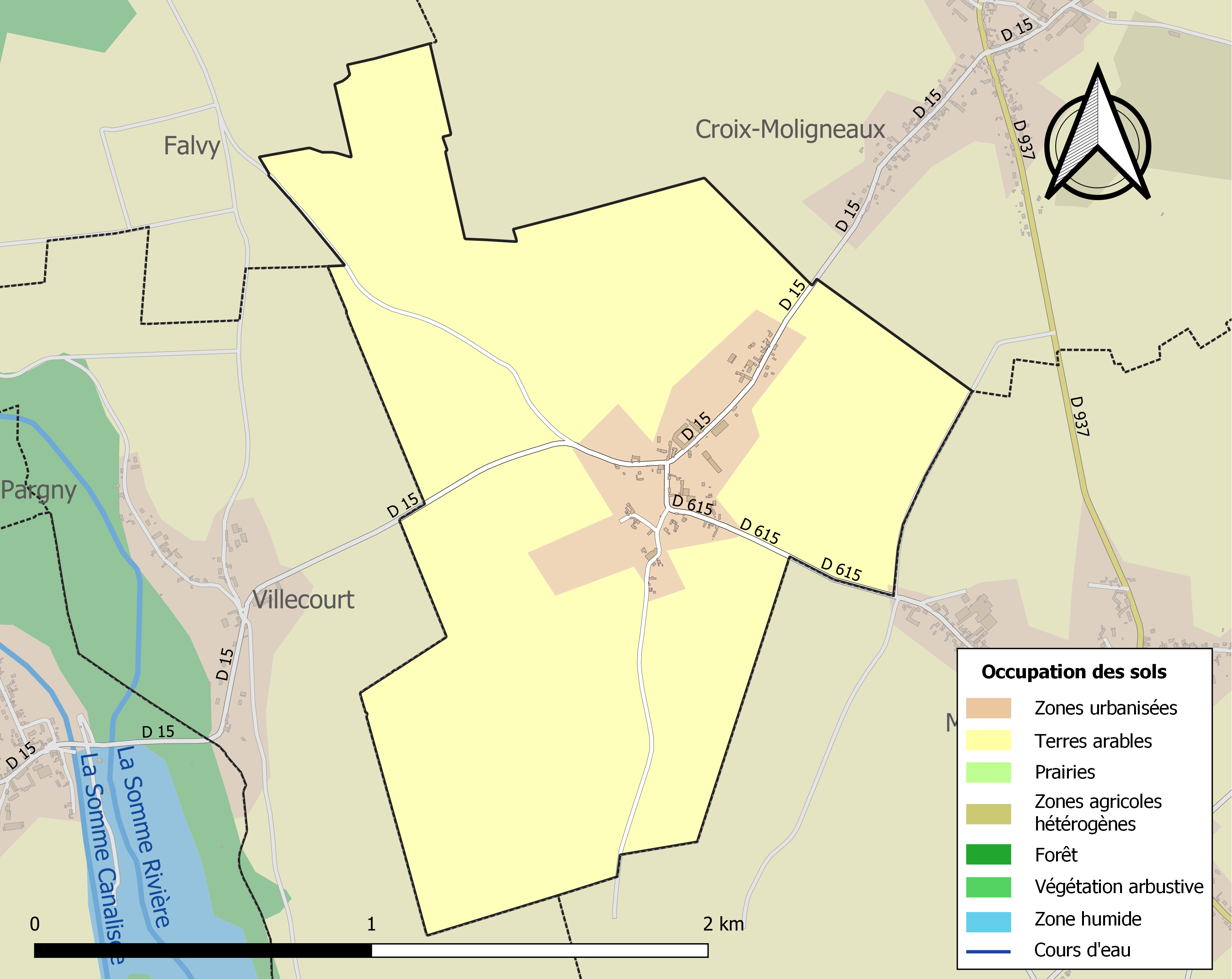
- Location of Y
- Location within France Location within Hauts-de-France
- Coordinates: 49°48′14″N 2°59′34″E
- Country: France
- Region: Hauts-de-France
- Department: Somme
- Arrondissement: Péronne
- Canton: Ham
- Intercommunality: Est de la Somme

Government
  - Mayor (2020–2026): Vincent Joly
- Area^{1}: 2.73 km^{2} (1.05 sq mi)
- Elevation: 72 m (236 ft)
- Highest elevation: 82 m (269 ft)
- Lowest elevation: 56 m (184 ft)
- Population (2023): 87
  - Density: 32/km^{2} (83/sq mi)
- Demonym: Ypsilonien(ne)
- Time zone: UTC+01:00 (CET)
  - Summer (DST): UTC+02:00 (CEST)
- INSEE/Postal code: 80829 /80190
- ^{1} French Land Register data, which excludes lakes, ponds, glaciers > 1 km^{2} (0.386 sq mi or 247 acres) and river estuaries.

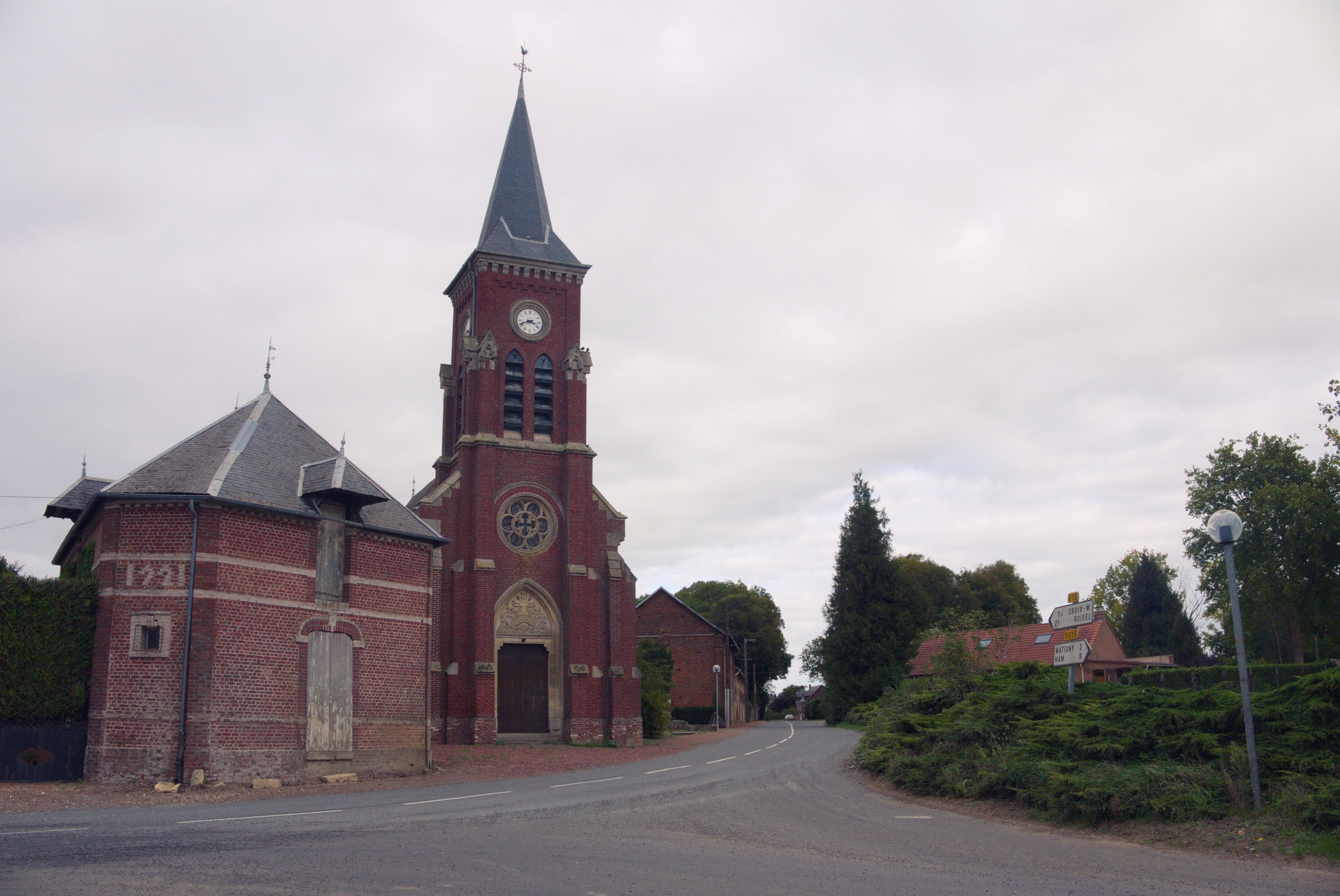
Y's church.

Y (French pronunciation: [i] ee) is a commune in the Somme department in Hauts-de-France in northern France.

Y bears the shortest place name in France, and one of the shortest in the world. The inhabitants call themselves Ypsilonien(ne)s, from the Greek letter Upsilon (Υ), which looks like the letter Y.

== Geography ==
Y is situated 50 kilometres (30 miles) east of Amiens and 115 kilometers north of Paris, at the junction of the D15 and D615 roads, in the far eastern side of the department.

=== Climate ===
In 2010, the climate of the commune was type 3, according to a study by French National Centre for Scientific Research based on a series of data covering the period 1971–2000. In 2020, Météo-France published a typology of the climate of metropolitan France, in which the commune is exposed to an oceanic climate and is in the North-East climatic region of the Paris basin, characterized by average sunshine, average rainfall regularly distributed throughout the year, and a cold winter (3 °C).

For 1971–2000, the mean annual temperature was 10.4 °C, with an annual temperature range of 15.1 °C. The average annual rainfall total is 709 mm, with 11 days of precipitation in January and 8.7 days in July. For 1991–2020, the average annual temperature observed at the nearest weather station, located in the municipality of Estrées-Mons, 8 kilometers away per great-circle navigation, is 11.0 °C and the mean annual precipitation total is 647.5 mm. For the future, the municipality's climate parameters estimate for 2050 according to different greenhouse gas emission scenarios can be consulted on a dedicated website published by Météo-France in November 2022.

== History ==
The village was once referred to with the Latin name Iacum or Ycium. Other names recorded from the 11th to 13th century are Iei, I, Hy, and Yerba, as well as Y.

The district belonged to the Y family from Vermandois.

The village was caught up in the First World War. It was decorated by a Croix de guerre on 15 December 1920. The Church of Saint-Médard was rebuilt in 1921 after the destruction caused by the First World War.

Since 2002, the commune has been part of the community of communes of the Pays Hamois, which succeeded the district of Ham, created in 1960. Then on 1 January 2017, Pays Hamois and that of the Pays Neslois, merged.

== Politics and administration ==
The commune is located in the Arrondissement of Péronne in the Somme department of northern France. Since 1958, the commune has elected deputies from Somme's 5th constituency.

Since 1801, the commune has been a part of the Canton of Ham. During the 2014 cantonal redistribution in France, the boundaries of the canton were expanded from 19 to 67 communes.

=== List of mayors ===
List of mayors of Y
In office		Mayor	Ref.
March 2001	2014	Charles Carpentier	
2014	Incumbent	Vincent Joly	

== Population ==
Based on the most recent INSEE census estimate, the population of Y is 87.

Historical population

Year	Pop.	±% p.a.
1793	160	—
1821	161	+0.02%
1846	218	+1.22%
1872	196	−0.41%
1901	210	+0.24%
1911	148	−3.44%
1921	106	−3.28%
1936	121	+0.89%
1946	125	+0.33%
1962	123	−0.10%

Year	Pop.	±% p.a.
1968	116	−0.97%
1975	86	−4.18%
1982	90	+0.65%
1990	82	−1.16%
1999	89	+0.91%
2007	80	−1.32%
2012	93	+3.06%
2017	92	−0.22%
2023	87	−0.93%

Source: EHESS and INSEE (1968-2023)

== See also ==
- Communes of the Somme department
- Saint-Remy-en-Bouzemont-Saint-Genest-et-Isson, a village in the Marne département and France's longest commune name.
