= Y (river) =

River in north Russia

Location
- Country: Russia

Physical characteristics
- Source
  - location: Verkhnetoyemsky District, Arkhangelsk Oblast, Russia
- Mouth: Vashka
  - coordinates: 63.1182°N 47.8655°E
- Length: 48 km (30 mi)

Basin features
- Progression: Vashka→ Mezen→ White Sea

The Y (Russian: Ы) is a river in the north of Russia. It flows in the territory of Arkhangelsk Oblast and the Komi Republic roughly east from its source in Verkhnetoyemsky District. The Y is a left tributary of the Vashka. It is 48 kilometres (30 mi) long.
