= Su, Iran =

Su سو
- Village
- Location within Iran
- Coordinates: 35°09′27″N 46°54′33″E
- Country: Iran
- Province: Kurdistan
- County: Sanandaj
- Bakhsh: Central
- Rural District: Naran

Population (2006)
  - Total: 566
- Time zone: UTC+3:30 (IRST)
  - Summer (DST): UTC+4:30 (IRDT)

Su (Persian: سو, also Romanized as Sū; also known as Sūy) is a village in Naran Rural District, in the Central District of Sanandaj County, Kurdistan Province, Iran. At the 2006 census, its population was 566, in 139 families. The village is populated by Kurds.
