= Hà Sơn Bình province =

Province that existed in North Vietnam

Hà Sơn Bình province on the administrative map of Vietnam in 1976

Hà Sơn Bình is a former province of Vietnam from December 27, 1975 to August 12, 1991 on the basis of the merger of the two provinces Hà Tây and Hòa Bình, now it's a part of Hanoi and Phú Thọ.

== Geography ==
Hà Sơn Bình province had a geographical location:

- The North borders on the province Vĩnh Phú
- The Northeast borders on capital Hanoi
- The East borders on the province Hải Hưng
- The Southeast borders on the province Hà Nam Ninh
- The South borders on the province Thanh Hóa
- The West borders on the province Sơn La.

== Administration ==
Hà Sơn Bình province had 24 affiliated district-level administrative units, including 3 towns: Hà Đông (provincial capital), Sơn Tây, Hòa Bình and 21 districts: Ba Vì, Chương Mỹ, Đà Bắc, Đan Phượng, Hoài Đức, Kim Bôi, Kỳ Sơn, Lạc Sơn, Lạc Thủy, Lương Sơn, Mai Châu, Mỹ Đức, Phú Xuyên, Phúc Thọ, Quốc Oai, Tân Lạc, Thạch Thất, Thanh Oai, Thường Tín, Ứng Hòa, Yên Thủy.

== History ==
On 29 December 1978, the two towns of Hà Đông, Sơn Tây and 5 districts of Đan Phượng, Hoài Đức, Ba Vì, Phúc Thọ, Thạch Thất and some communes of the district Quốc Oai, Thạch Thất, Thanh Oai, Thường Tín were admitted to Hanoi by resolution of the 4th session of the 6th National Assembly. However, in reality, Hà Đông town is still in Hà Sơn Bình province and is the capital. The province has 2 towns: Hà Đông, Hòa Bình and 16 districts: Chương Mỹ, Đà Bắc, Kim Bôi, Kỳ Sơn, Lạc Sơn, Lạc Thủy, Lương Sơn, Mai Châu, Mỹ Đức, Phú Xuyên, Quốc Oai, Tân Lạc, Thanh Oai, Thường Tín, Ứng Hòa, Yên Thủy, with area of 5,978 km^{2}, population of 1,569,000 people (1981).

On 12 August 1991, the 9th session National Assembly term VIII issued a resolution to divide Hà Sơn Bình province to re-establish Hà Tây and Hòa Bình. At the same time, return Sơn Tây town and 5 districts: Đan Phượng, Hoài Đức, Ba Vì, Phúc Thọ, Thạch Thất of Hanoi city to Hà Tây province.

- The province Hà Tây includes 2 cities: Hà Đông, Sơn Tây and 12 districts: Ba Vì, Chương Mỹ, Đan Phượng, Hoài Đức, Mỹ Đức, Phú Xuyên, Phúc Thọ, Quốc Oai, Thạch Thất, Thanh Oai, Thường Tín, Ứng Hòa.
- The province Hòa Bình includes Hòa Bình city and 9 districts: Đà Bắc, Kim Bôi, Kỳ Sơn, Lạc Sơn, Lạc Thủy, Lương Sơn, Mai Châu, Tân Lạc, Yên Thủy.

From 1 August 2008, the entire area and population of province Hà Tây was merged into Hanoi City. From there, officially dissolved Hà Tây province. On 8 May 2009, Hà Đông city became Hà Đông district under the capital Hanoi, Sơn Tây city became Sơn Tây town under the capital city of Hanoi. At the same time, the boundaries of Quốc Oai and Thạch Thất districts were also adjusted and merged with four more communes in the district of Lương Sơn, Hòa Bình province.

== See also ==
- Hà Tây
- Hòa Bình
- Hanoi
