= Hà Tây province =

Historical province of Vietnam

Hà Tây province Tỉnh Hà Tây
- Province
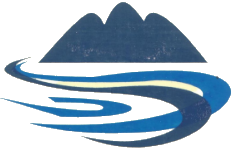
- Seal

- Location of Hà Tây within Vietnam
- Coordinates: 20°50′N 105°40′E
- Country: Vietnam
- Region: Red River Delta
- Capital: Hà Đông

Government
  - People's Council Chair: Khuất Hữu Sơn

Area
  - Total: 2,192.1 km^{2} (846.4 sq mi)

Population (2008)
  - Total: 2,568,007
  - Density: 1,171.5/km^{2} (3,034.1/sq mi)

Demographics
  - Ethnicities: Vietnamese, Mường, Dao, Tày
- Time zone: UTC+7 (ICT)
- Calling code: 343
- ISO 3166 code: VN-15

Hà Tây was a former province of Vietnam, in the Red River Delta, now part of Hanoi.

== Geography ==
Before being merged into Hanoi City on August 1, 2008, Hà Tây was subdivided into 14 district-level sub-divisions:

- 12 districts:
  - Ba Vì
  - Chương Mỹ
  - Đan Phượng
  - Hoài Đức
  - Mỹ Đức
  - Phú Xuyên
  - Phúc Thọ
  - Quốc Oai
  - Thạch Thất
  - Thanh Oai
  - Thường Tín
  - Ứng Hòa
- 2 provincial cities:
  - Hà Đông (former capital, and used to be an urban district within Hanoi)
  - Sơn Tây (used to be a district-level town within Hanoi)

At the time, those were further subdivided into 22 commune-level towns (or townlets), 405 communes, and 26 wards.

== History ==
The province was first created in 1967 and was dissolved in 1976 when it was merged with Hòa Bình Province into Hà Sơn Bình Province. Its name Hà Tây was grafted from "Hà Đông" and "Sơn Tây", two old provinces in the Gulf of Tonkin.

The province was dissolved and both Hà Tây and Hòa Bình reverted into separate provinces on August 12, 1991.

On May 29, 2008 the decision was made to subsume Hà Tây into the city of Hanoi. The merger took place on August 1, 2008.

== See also ==
- Hà Nam
- Vĩnh Phúc
- Hòa Bình
- Hà Nội
- Phú Thọ
- Hưng Yên
