= Quốc Oai (disambiguation) =

Quốc Oai may refer to several places in Vietnam, including:

- Quốc Oai, a commune of Hanoi
- Quốc Oai district, a former rural district of Hanoi.
