= Vân Canh (disambiguation) =

Vân Canh is a commune of Gia Lai province, Vietnam.

Vân Canh may also refer to several places in Vietnam:

- Vân Canh district, a former rural district of Bình Định Province
- Vân Canh, Hanoi, a former rural commune of Hoài Đức district
