= Đường Lâm Ancient Village =

Coordinates: 21°08′53″N 105°28′34″E

- Interactive map of Đường Lâm Ancient Village
- Location: Duong Lam Commune, Sơn Tây, Hà Nội, Việt Nam
- Designation: Special National Relic

Đường Lâm is a locality in northern Việt Nam. The name "Đường Lâm" has been used at various times throughout Vietnamese history to refer to different administrative units. Today, it generally denotes a cluster of ancient villages located in the area of Sơn Tây, Hà Nội.

The Đường Lâm area lies on the right bank of the Red River (southern bank), near National Route 32, at its junction with National Route 21A. It is situated approximately 50 km west of central Hanoi. The Tich River flows through the area, originating from the Suối Hai Lake.

== Name ==
Prior to 2025, the name "Đường Lâm" was used to refer to a commune in Sơn Tây, Hà Nội. The commune of Đường Lâm was established after the August Revolution of 1945, based on former communes of Cam Giá Thịnh (or Cam Giá Hạ) canton.

Throughout history, this area had never been known as "Đường Lâm" until 21 November 1964, when Phùng Hưng Commune was officially renamed Đường Lâm Commune.

== Administration ==
Among the nine hamlets currently belonging to Đường Lâm Commune, five are considered authentic ancient villages: Cam Thịnh (a shortened form of Cam Giá Thịnh), Cam Lâm (formerly known as Cam Tuyền), Đoài Giáp, Đông Sàng, and Mông Phụ. The remaining four hamlets are relatively recent. In the early 19th century, Phụ Khang was originally a small, separate settlement of Mông Phụ. Hầ Tân and Hưng Thịnh, which were formerly parts of Đông Sàng and Cam Thịnh, were established as independent hamlets approximately 30–40 years ago. Văn Miếu, meanwhile, was separated from Mông Phụ less than a decade ago.

== History ==
Đường Lâm became the first ancient village in Vietnam to be officially recognized by the state as a National Historical and Cultural Relic on 19 May 2006.

It is the birthplace of several notable historical figures, including Lady Man Thien (mother of the Trung Sisters), Phùng Hưng (posthumously titled Bố Cái Đại Vương), King Ngô Quyền, scholar Giang Văn Minh and consort of Lord Trịnh Tráng), as well as Phan Kế Toại, Hà Kế Tấn, Kiều Mậu Hãn, Phan Kế An. Đường Lâm is also known as the “land of two kings” (đất hai vua), as it was the birthplace of both Phùng Hưng and Ngô Quyền.

Although commonly referred to as an “ancient village,” Đường Lâm historically consisted of nine villages belonging to Cam Giá Thịnh canton, Phúc Thọ District, in Sơn Tây Province. Among these, five villages - Mông Phụ, Đông Sàng, Cam Thịnh, Đoài Giáp, and Cam Lâm - are located adjacent to one another. These villages have long formed a unified cultural entity, sharing customs, traditions, and beliefs that have remained largely unchanged for centuries. In the early 19th century, Đường Lâm served as the administrative center of Son Tay Province.

== Architecture ==
Today, Đường Lâm retains most of the fundamental features of a traditional Vietnamese village, including the village gate, banyan tree, water wharf, communal yard, pagoda, shrine, guard posts, wells, rice fields, and surrounding hills. The road system of Đường Lâm is distinctive for its fishbone-like layout. With this structure, routes leading from the communal house never turn their backs toward the main sanctuary.

A notable feature is the preservation of an ancient village gate in Mông Phụ village. Unlike many village gates in the northern region of Vietnam, which often include upper chambers with vaulted roofs, this gate is simply a two-sided gabled structure located directly along the village entrance. Also in Mông Phụ is Mông Phụ communal house, built in 1684 during the Vinh To era of Emperor Lê Hy Tông of the Later Le dynasty. It is considered a representative example of traditional Vietnamese communal architecture. The courtyard of the communal house is set lower than the surrounding ground level; during rainfall, water flows into the yard and drains out through two side outlets, forming a symbolic image resembling the whiskers of a dragon. Each year, festivals are held here from the first to the tenth day of the first lunar month, featuring traditional rituals and games such as offerings of pigs and chickens.

Regarding traditional houses, Đường Lâm has a total of 956 historic houses, of which Đông Sàng, Mông Phụ và Cam Thịnh villages account for 441, 350, and 165 houses respectively. Many of these houses date back several centuries (e.g., 1649, 1703, 1850). A defining characteristic of these traditional houses is their construction using laterite blocks.

Among the eight historical and cultural relics in Đường Lâm (including Mộng Phụ communal house), Mia Pagoda (also known as Sùng Nghiêm Tự) has been classified as a site of special significance by the Ministry of Culture and Information. The pagoda houses 287 statues, including 6 bronze statues, 107 wooden statues, and 174 earthen statues made from clay combined with banyan roots and trunks.

=== Sơn Tây Temple of Literature ===
The Sơn Tây Temple of Literature served as a regional Confucian temple for Xứ Đoài area. Prior to the Nguyễn dynasty, and until 1831, it was one of the four Temples of Literature of the Tứ Trấn Thăng Long (the four guardian regions surrounding Thăng Long). In 1831, when Sơn Tây Province was established under the Nguyễn dynasty, it became the provincial Temple of Literature, located in Cam Giá Thịnh village (present-day Cam Thịnh hamlet of Đường Lâm).

In the seventh lunar month of the year Đinh Mùi (1847), during the reign of Emperor Thiệu Trị, the provincial temple was relocated from Cam Thịnh to Mông Phụ village, within Cam Giá Thịnh canton. This location corresponds to the site where the temple was reconstructed in 2012 in Văn Miếu hamlet, Đường Lâm Commune. The relocation was carried out under the supervision of Governor-General Nguyễn Đăng Giai.

In the third year of the Thành Thái reign (1891), Governor-General Cao Xuân Dục ordered the restoration of the temple at its 1847 location. By 1947, the site had been destroyed as a result of the Việt Minh's scorched-earth policy during the resistance against the French, as well as wartime devastation between 1947 and 1954.

Prior to 2012, during the period of the Socialist Republic of Vietnam, a seven-storey facility for food processing and livestock breeding was constructed on the site. In 2012, the Hà Nội municipal government relocated this facility in order to reconstruct the Son Tay Temple of Literature.

== Traditional crafts ==
Soy sauce production is a well-known traditional craft in Đường Lâm, and the quality of its products is considered comparable to that of other famous soy sauce-making villages such as Bần Yên Nhân in Hưng Yên and Cự Đà in Thanh Oai (former Ha Tay Province).

The area is also known for a variety of traditional sweets, including kẹo dồi (peanut nougat), kẹo lạc (peanut candy), and chè lam. In addition, Đường Lâm is renowned for its distinctive thịt quay đòn (roasted pork roll), a specialty with a unique flavor characteristic of the region.

== Tourism ==
The best time to visit Đường Lâm Ancient Village is generally during spring (March–April) and autumn (SeptemberNovember), when the weather is mild. During spring, the landscape is characterized by cooler temperatures and scenic rural views, including golden rice fields.

Đường Lâm Ancient Village features a range of historical and cultural sites. Notable attractions include Mía Pagoda, Mông Phụ Communal House, Phùng Hưng Temple, Ngô Quyền Mausoleum.
