= Thống Nhất, Phú Thọ =

Thống Nhất Phường Thống Nhất
- Ward
- View of Thống Nhất Ward
- Interactive map of Thống Nhất
- Location in Vietnam
- Country: Vietnam
- Regions: Northeast
- Province: Phú Thọ Province
- Established: June 16, 2025

Area
  - Total: 55.21 km^{2} (21.32 sq mi)

Population (2025)
  - Total: 22,897
  - Density: 414.7/km^{2} (1,074/sq mi)
- Time zone: UTC+07:00 (Indochina Time)

Thống Nhất is a ward (phường) of Phú Thọ Province, Vietnam.

== Geography ==
Thống Nhất Ward located in eastern Phú Thọ Province, and adjacent to:

- Đà Bắc Commune, Tân Hòa Ward and Hòa Bình Ward to the north
- Thung Nai Commune and Cao Phong Commune to the south
- Tiền Phong Commune to the west
- Nật Sơn Commune, Mường Động Commune and Kỳ Sơn Ward to the east.

== History ==
On June 12, 2025, the National Assembly of Vietnam issued Resolution No. 202/2025/QH15 on the arrangement of provincial-level administrative units (effective from June 12, 2025). Accordingly, the entire land area and population of Vĩnh Phúc Province, Hòa Bình Province and Phú Thọ Province were merged to form a new province named Phú Thọ Province.

On June 16, 2025, the Standing Committee of the National Assembly of Vietnam issued Resolution No. 1676/NQ-UBTVQH15 on the arrangement of commune-level administrative units of Phú Thọ Province in 2025 (effective from June 16, 2025). Accordingly, the entire land area and population of Dân Chủ, Thái Bình, Thống Nhất Wards, and the remaining part of Vầy Nưa Commune after being arranged were merged to form a new ward named Thống Nhất Ward.
