= Vân Hà (disambiguation) =

Vân Hà may refer to several places in Vietnam, including:

- Vân Hà, Bắc Ninh, a ward in Bắc Ninh city
- Vân Hà, Đông Anh, a former commune of Đông Anh District in Hanoi
- Vân Hà, Phúc Thọ, a former commune of Phúc Thọ District in Hanoi
