= An Thượng =

An Thượng may refer to several places in Vietnam:

- An Thượng, Bắc Giang, a rural commune of Yên Thế District
- An Thượng, Hải Dương, a rural commune of Hải Dương city
- An Thượng, Hanoi, a rural commune of Hoài Đức District
