= Chương Mỹ =

Chương Mỹ Ward Phường Chương Mỹ Thị trấn Chúc Sơn
- Ward (Class-II)
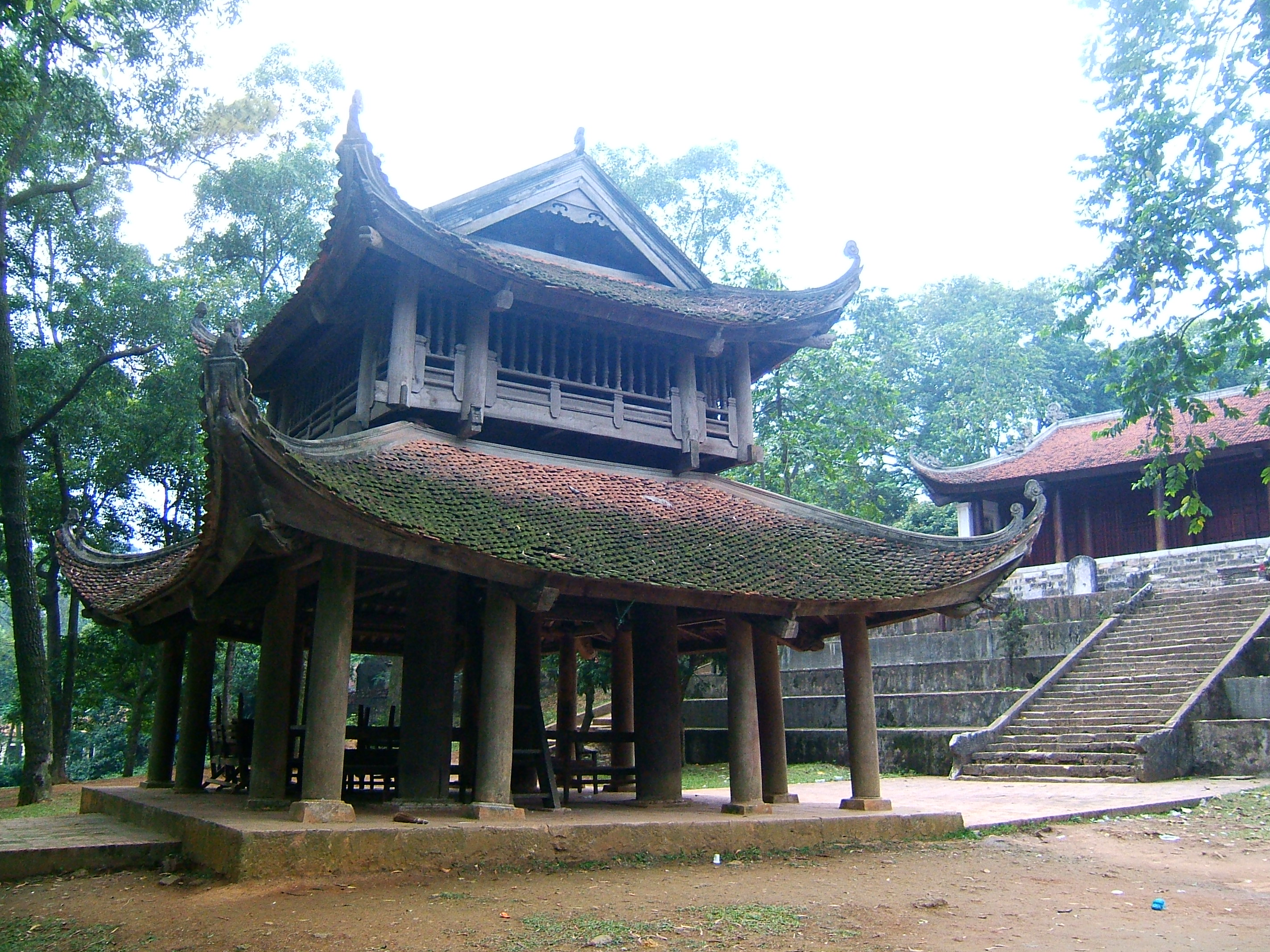
- Bell house at Quảng Nghiêm Pagoda.

- Location within Vietnam
- Coordinates: 20°55′09″N 105°42′06″E
- Country: Vietnam
- Region: Red River Delta
- Municipality: Hà Nội
- Establishment: IX century (mueang); December 26, 1990 (township); April 19, 2025 (ward)
- Central hall: No.102, Trần Tuấn Hải road, Bắc Sơn little zone, Chương Mỹ ward

Government
  - Type: Ward-level authority
  - People Committee's Chairman: Nguyễn Anh Đức
  - People Council's Chairman: Trịnh Tiến Tường
  - Front Committee's Chairman: Vũ Xuân Hùng
  - Party Committee's Secretary: Nguyễn Văn Thắng

Area
  - Ward (Class-II): 38.89 km^{2} (15.02 sq mi)
  - Urban: 5.52 km^{2} (2.13 sq mi)

Population (2025)
  - Ward (Class-II): 76,307
  - Density: 1,962/km^{2} (5,082/sq mi)
  - Urban density: 2,631/km^{2} (6,810/sq mi)
  - Metro: 14,528
  - Ethnicities: Kinh; Tanka; Mường; Thái
- Time zone: UTC+7 (Indochina Time)
- ZIP code: 13406 (Note: An official code from December 31, 2021, to present.)
- Website: Chuongmy.Hanoi.gov.vn; Chuongmy.Hanoi.dcs.vn

Chương Mỹ [ʨɨəŋ˧˧:miʔi˧˥] is a suburban ward of Hà Nội the capital city in the Red River Delta of Vietnam.

== History ==
On April 19, 2025, to response the Plan to arrange and merge administrative units in Vietnam 2024–2025 by the Government of Vietnam, the Hà Nội City People's Committee directed the Chương Mỹ Rural-District People's Council to conduct the conference thoroughly grasped and implemented the task of arranging commune-level administrative units. (Note: Hội nghị quán triệt, [và] triển khai nhiệm vụ sắp xếp đơn vị hành chính cấp xã.) Therefore, the result of the conference was a Resolution on the dissolution of Chương Mỹ Rural District, followed by another Resolution on the merging of old communes and the establishment of 1 ward and 5 new communes with their new names.

According to the political document officially published for the press, the entire area and demography of Chúc Sơn township (thị trấn Chúc Sơn) have been merged with the same ones of five old communes Đại Yên, Ngọc Hòa, Phụng Châu, Thụy Hương, Tiên Phương from former Chương Mỹ rural district and the same halfs of two former wards Biên Giang & Đồng Mai from former Hà Đông urban district. This new administrative unit is called as Chương Mỹ ward (phường Chương Mỹ), what inherits most of the cultural and historical heritage of the former rural-district level. It is directly administered by Hanoi City.

== See also ==
- Hòa Phú
- Phú Nghĩa
- Quảng Bị
- Trần Phú
- Xuân Mai
