= Lạc Giao Communal House =

- Đình Lạc Giao
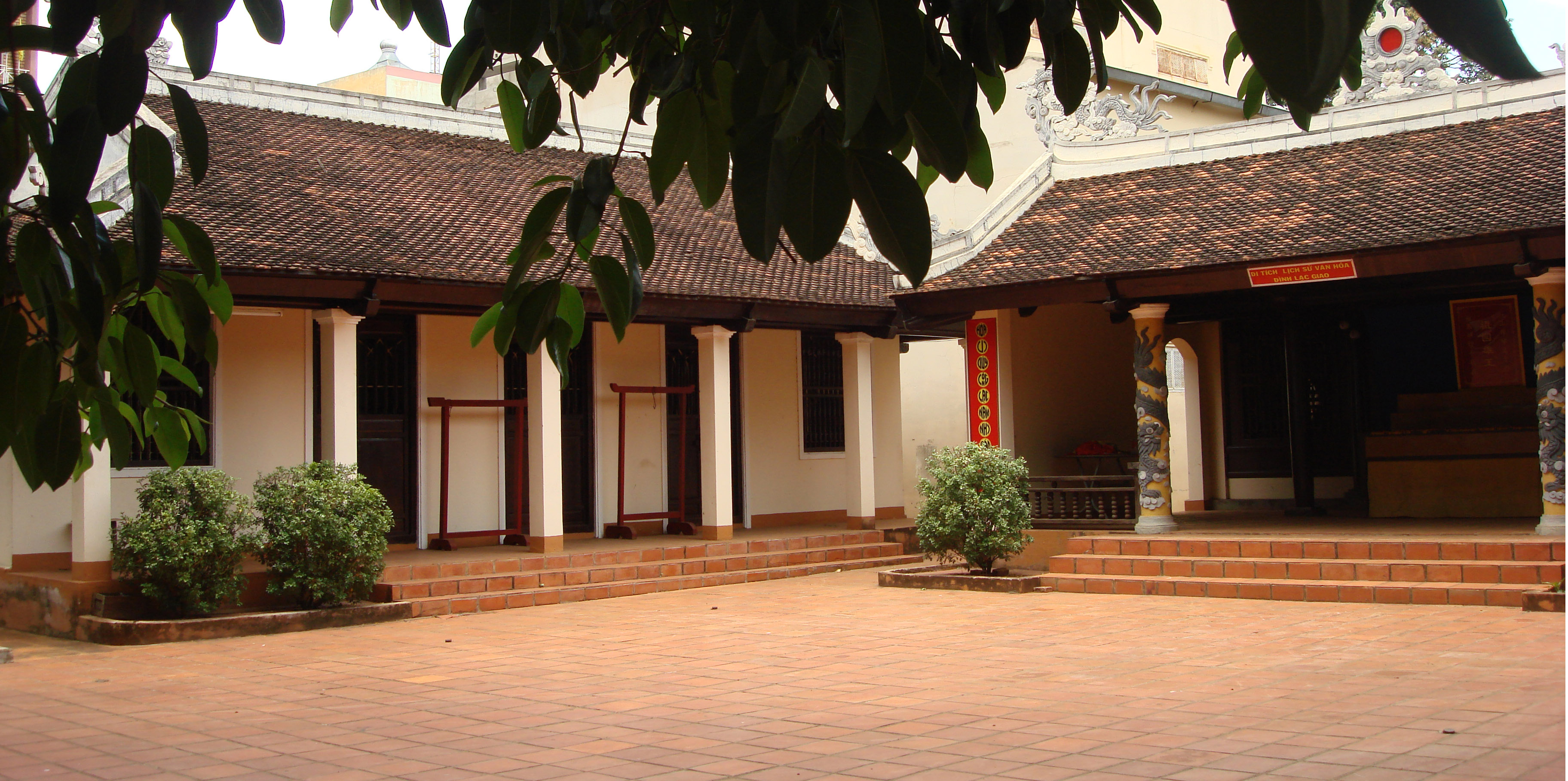

Location
- Location: Buôn Ma Thuột, Đắk Lắk Province, Vietnam
- Country: Vietnam
- Interactive map of Lạc Giao Communal House
- Coordinates: 12°40′59″N 108°2′26″E

Architecture
- Established: 1928 (rebuilt 1932)
- Type: National Heritage site
- Criteria: Historical relics – culture
- Designated: March 2, 1990
- Reference no.: 168-VHQD

Lạc Giao Communal House (Vietnamese: Đình Lạc Giao) is a traditional Vietnamese communal house located at 67 Phan Bội Châu Street, Thống Nhất Ward, in the center of Buôn Ma Thuột city, Đắk Lắk Province, Vietnam. It is recognized as the first communal house built by the Kinh people in the Central Highlands region and serves as a place of worship for the city god Đào Duy Từ, the village founder Phan Hộ, and the Hùng Kings. The site was designated a national historical relic in 1990 and holds significance for its role in local history, culture, and revolutionary events.

== History ==
The construction of Lạc Giao communal house began in 1928 when Phan Hộ, along with ten Kinh households from Khánh Hòa Province, migrated to Buôn Ma Thuột to reclaim land and establish the village of Lạc Giao. Initially a simple structure, it was rebuilt more solidly with bricks and tiles in 1932. The đình received an imperial decree from the Nguyễn dynasty to worship Đào Duy Từ, a prominent 17th-century scholar and official, as the tutelary deity. During the August Revolution in 1945, the đình served as a gathering point for revolutionary forces. On the night of December 1, 1945, French colonial forces attacked, resulting in the massacre of around 100 revolutionaries and civilians. The site later became a memorial for these victims. In March 1975, it housed the provisional military administration committee following the liberation of Buôn Ma Thuột during the Vietnam War. Despite being bombed, the structure remained intact. The đình was officially recognized as a national historical site by the Ministry of Culture and Information on March 2, 1990. A major restoration was completed in 2005 to preserve its traditional architecture.

== Architecture ==
The communal house covers an area of approximately 700 square meters and follows a traditional Vietnamese layout in the shape of the character "môn" (門). It includes a three-gate entrance, a tiger-faced screen, a courtyard, the main hall, and a rear hall, with auxiliary buildings on the sides. The structure features brick walls, wooden doors, and a tiled roof with dragon boat motifs, cloud patterns, and carvings of mythical creatures such as dragons, phoenixes, and the four noble plants. The interior includes altars, engraved wooden beams, and couplets in gold-lacquered Hán-Nôm script.

== Cultural significance ==
As the earliest example of a Kinh communal house in the Central Highlands, Lạc Giao communal house symbolizes the settlement and cultural adaptation of Vietnamese people in the region during the early 20th century. It functions as a community center for rituals and festivals, including the Spring Sacrifice on the 17th day of the first lunar month, the Autumn Sacrifice on the 17th day of the eighth lunar month, and commemorations for the 1945 massacre victims on the 27th day of the tenth lunar month. Since 2010, it has also hosted provincial-level celebrations for the Hùng Kings' Festival on the 10th day of the third lunar month, incorporating traditional dances and activities. The site is managed by the Đắk Lắk Museum and serves as a "red address" for patriotic education and tourism.
