= Cao Phong (disambiguation) =

Cao Phong may refer to several places in Vietnam, including:

- Cao Phong, Phú Thọ, a commune of Phú Thọ province
- Cao Phong district, a former rural district of Hòa Bình Province
- Cao Phong, Vĩnh Phúc, a former rural commune of Sông Lô District.
