= Đặng Thụy =

Đặng Thụy 鄧瑞
- In office 1683–1729

Personal details
- Born: 1649; Lương Xá village, Chương Đức district, Ứng Thiên prefect, Nam Thượng town, Vietnam
- Died: 1735; Lương Xá village, Chương Đức district, Ứng Thiên prefect, Nam Thượng town, Vietnam
- Parent(s): Đặng Tiến Thự (father); Nguyễn Thị (mother)
- Occupation: Politician, poet, writer

Đặng Thụy (chữ Hán: 鄧瑞, 1649–1735) was a Vietnamese official of the Revival Lê dynasty.

== Biography ==
Đặng Thụy has a courtesy name Đình Tướng (廷相), pseudonym Trúc Trai Fairy Oldman (竹齋仙翁), nick name Fairy National Oldman (仙國老). He was born in 1649 at Lương Xá village, Chương Đức district, Ứng Thiên prefect, Nam Thượng town. His father was Duke Trịnh Liễu and his grandfather was general Đặng Thế Tài, his forefather was Đặng Huấn who entered the restoration of the Lê dynasty. Lương Xá village's Đặng clan has been fathered by general Đặng Dung.

== Works ==
- Trúc Ông phụng sứ tập (竹翁奉使集)
- Linh Giang doanh vệ lục
- Thuật cổ quy huấn lục
- Dưỡng đức tính (養德性)
- Thì triều thị
- Thân chính nhân
- Sùng chính học (崇政學)
- Viễn nữ sắc (遠好色)
- Trạch bộc ngự
- Giới kiêu xa
- Biện trung nịnh
