= Tân Hòa, Phú Thọ =

Tân Hòa Phường Tân Hòa
- Ward
- Interactive map of Tân Hòa
- Location in Vietnam
- Country: Vietnam
- Regions: Northeast
- Province: Phú Thọ Province
- Established: June 16, 2025

Area
  - Total: 56.98 km^{2} (22.00 sq mi)

Population (2025)
  - Total: 14,316
  - Density: 251.2/km^{2} (650.7/sq mi)
- Time zone: UTC+07:00 (Indochina Time)

Tân Hòa is a ward (phường) of Phú Thọ Province, Vietnam.

== Geography ==
Tân Hòa Ward located in eastern Phú Thọ Province, and adjacent to:

- Yên Sơn Commune to the north
- Thống Nhất Ward to the south
- Đà Bắc Commune to the west
- Kỳ Sơn Ward and Hòa Bình Ward to the east.

== History ==
On June 12, 2025, the National Assembly of Vietnam issued Resolution No. 202/2025/QH15 on the arrangement of provincial-level administrative units (effective from June 12, 2025). Accordingly, the entire land area and population of Vĩnh Phúc Province, Hòa Bình Province and Phú Thọ Province were merged to form a new province named Phú Thọ Province.

On June 16, 2025, the Standing Committee of the National Assembly of Vietnam issued Resolution No. 1676/NQ-UBTVQH15 on the arrangement of commune-level administrative units of Phú Thọ Province in 2025 (effective from June 16, 2025). Accordingly, the entire land area and population of Tân Hòa Ward, Hòa Bình Commune and Yên Mông Commune were merged to form a new ward named Tân Hòa.
