= Dương Hòa =

- Commune
- Interactive map of Dương Hòa
- Coordinates: 21.042027317036727°N 105.6731761769879°E
- Country: Vietnam
- Region: Red River Delta
- Municipality: Hanoi
- Administrative headquarters: Yên Sở 3 Hamlet

Area
  - Total: 17.41 km^{2} (6.72 sq mi)

Population (2025)
  - Total: 58,830
  - Density: 3,378/km^{2} (8,750/sq mi)
- Website: duonghoa.hanoi.gov.vn

Dương Hòa is a commune in the municipality of Hanoi, Vietnam.

On 16 June 2025, district-level administrative units nationwide ceased to operate.

On the same date, the Standing Committee of the National Assembly of Vietnam issued Resolution No. 1656/NQ-UBTVQH15 on the arrangement of commune-level administrative units in Hanoi in 2025. Under the resolution, the entire area and population of Cát Quế, Dương Liễu, Đắc Sở, Minh Khai, and Yên Sở communes, formerly part of Hoài Đức district, were merged to form a new commune named Dương Hòa.
