= Quốc Oai =

Commune in Hanoi, Vietnam

- Commune
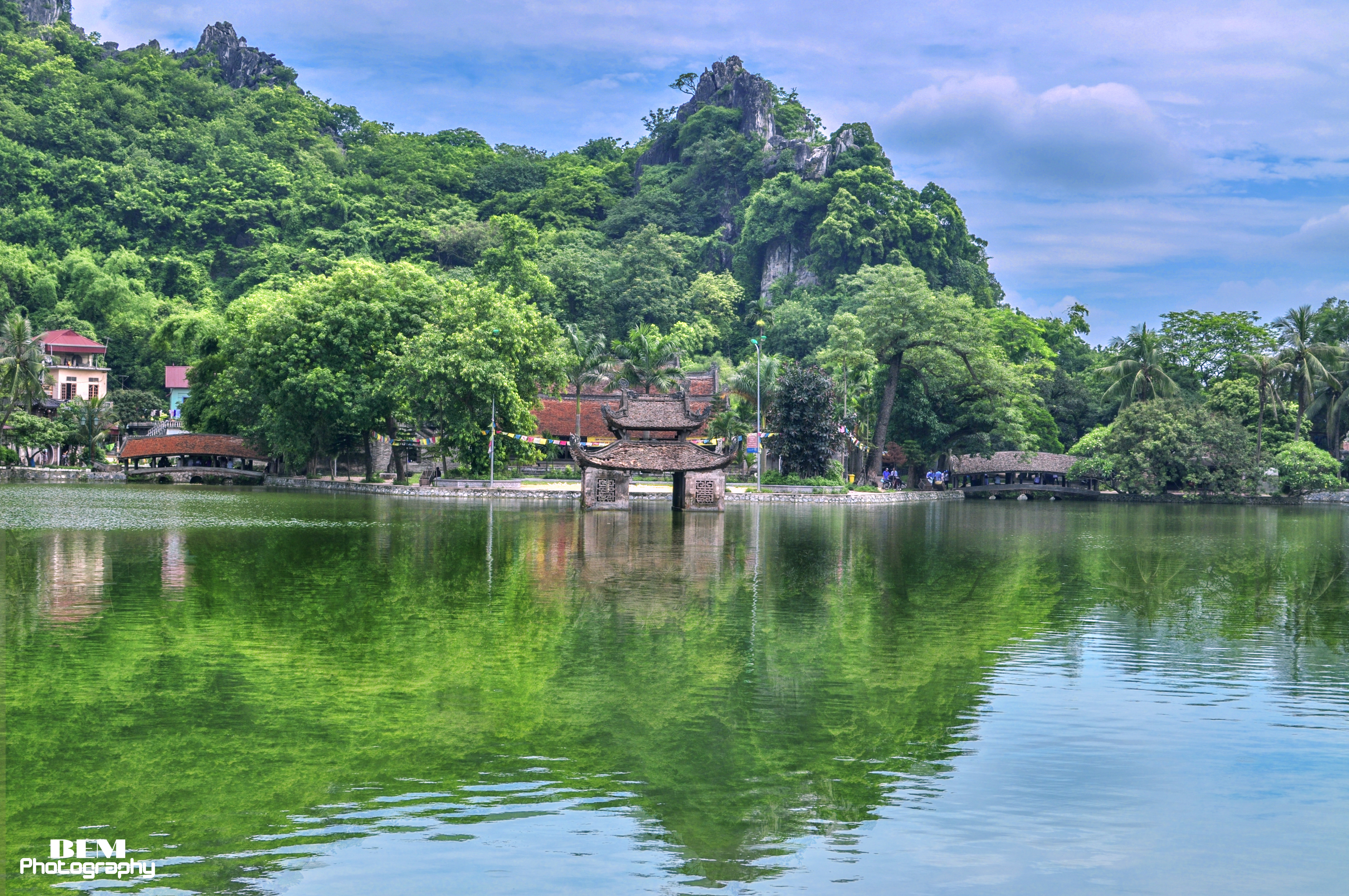
- Thầy Pagoda
- Interactive map of Quốc Oai
- Coordinates: 20.99173425344392°N 105.64087941340237°E
- Country: Vietnam
- Region: Red River Delta
- Municipality: Hanoi
- Administrative headquarters: No. 10 17/8 Street

Area
  - Total: 24 km^{2} (9.3 sq mi)

Population (2025)
  - Total: 63,344
  - Density: 2,639/km^{2} (6,830/sq mi)
- Website: quocoai.hanoi.gov.vn

Quốc Oai is a commune in the municipality of Hanoi, Vietnam.

On 16 June 2025, district-level administrative units nationwide ceased to operate.

On the same date, the Standing Committee of the National Assembly of Vietnam issued Resolution No. 1656/NQ-UBTVQH15 on the arrangement of commune-level administrative units in Hanoi in 2025. Under the resolution, the entire area and population of Thạch Thán and Sài Sơn communes, part of the area of Ngọc Mỹ Commune, and the remaining areas of Quốc Oai Township and Phượng Sơn Commune, formerly part of Quốc Oai district, were merged to form a new commune named Quốc Oai.
