= Quảng Phú Cầu =

- Commune
- Interactive map of Quảng Phú Cầu
- Coordinates: 20°46′36″N 105°46′54″E
- Country: Vietnam
- City: Hanoi
- District: Ứng Hòa

Area
  - Total: 3.300 sq mi (8.546 km^{2})

Population (2009)
  - Total: 10,750
- Time zone: UTC+07:00 (Indochina Time)

Quảng Phú Cầu is a former commune of Ứng Hòa district in Hanoi, Vietnam. The commune has an area of 8.546 km^{2}, and its population in 2009 was 10,750 with a density of 1,258/km^{2}.

== Geography ==
Quảng Phú Cầu covers an area of 8.546 km^{2} (3.300 sq mi), which includes six villages: Xa Cau, Quang Nguyen, Phu Luong Thuong, Phu Luong Ha, Cau Bau, and Dao Tu. Located in the northeast of Ứng Hòa district, it is bordered to the east by Phú Túc (Phú Xuyên district), to the west and north by Hồng Dương commune (Thanh Oai district), to the southwest by Trường Thịnh and Liên Bạt.

=== Climate ===
The climate is humid subtropical. The average temperature is 23 °C (73 °F). The hottest month is July, at 27 °C (81 °F), and the coldest is January, at 18 °C (64 °F). The average rainfall is 2,285 mm (90.0 in) per year. The wettest month is August, at 462 mm (18.2 in) of rainfall, and the driest is January, at 17 mm (0.67 in).

== Economy ==
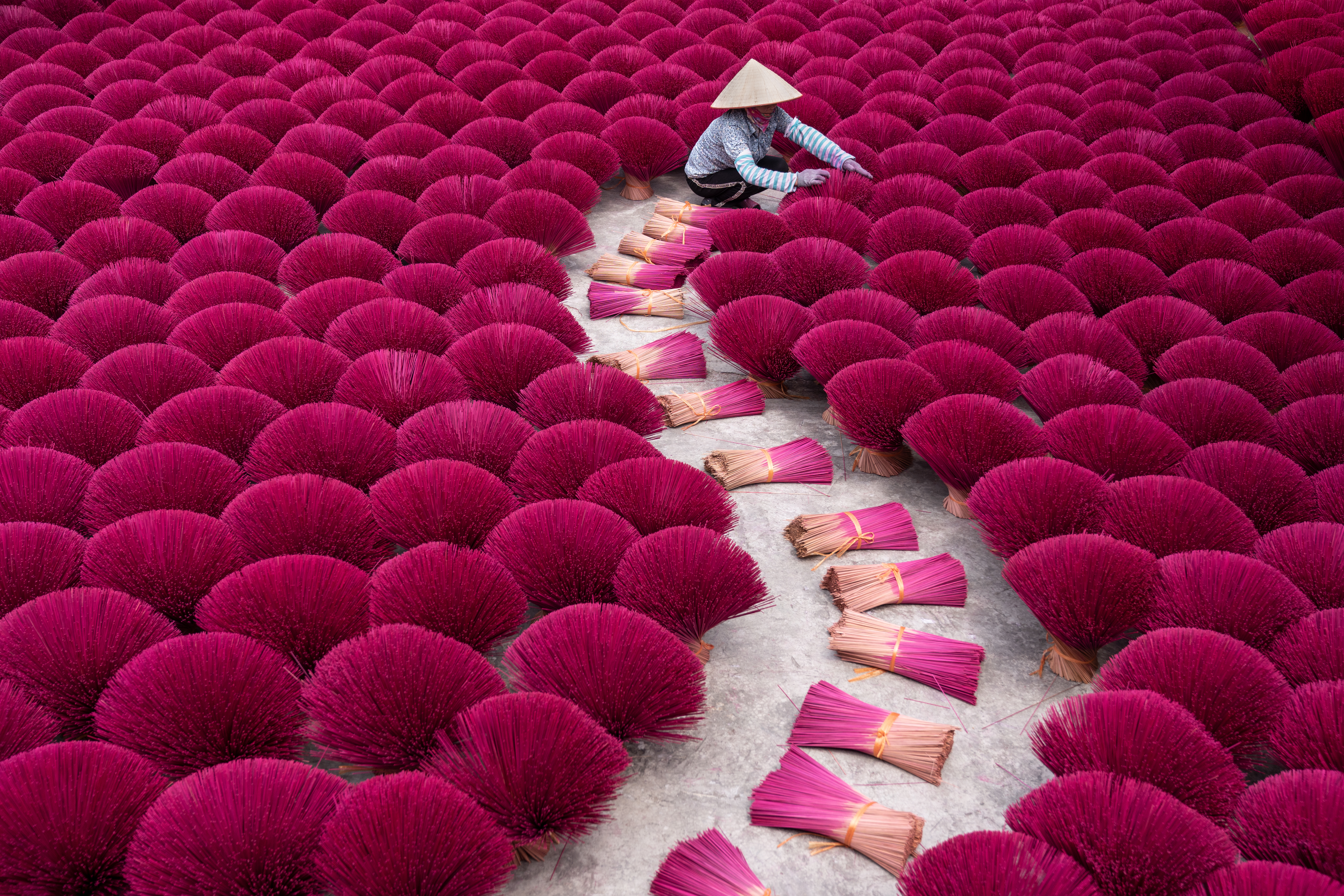
Rose colored incense sticks set out to dry in Quảng Phú Cầu village outside Hanoi, Vietnam.

Quảng Phú Cầu has a strong economy, based mainly on handicrafts, the main one being the production of incense sticks, especially for spiritual needs. This activity supports some 3,000 families. This activity also attracts many tourists to the commune.
