= Kỳ Sơn, Phú Thọ =

Ward in Vietnam

Kỳ Sơn Phường Kỳ Sơn
- Ward
- Interactive map of Kỳ Sơn
- Location in Vietnam
- Country: Vietnam
- Regions: Northeast
- Province: Phú Thọ Province
- Established: June 16, 2025

Area
  - Total: 115.70 km^{2} (44.67 sq mi)

Population (2025)
  - Total: 20,319
  - Density: 175.62/km^{2} (454.85/sq mi)
- Time zone: UTC+07:00 (Indochina Time)

Kỳ Sơn is a ward (phường) of Phú Thọ Province, Vietnam.

== Geography ==
Kỳ Sơn Ward is located in the eastern Phú Thọ Province, and adjacent to:

- Thịnh Minh Commune to the north
- Nật Sơn Commune to the south
- Tân Hòa Ward, Hòa Bình Ward and Thống Nhất Ward to the west
- Lương Sơn Commune and Hanoi CIty to the east.

== History ==
On June 12, 2025, the National Assembly of Vietnam issued Resolution No. 202/2025/QH15 on the arrangement of provincial-level administrative units (effective from June 12, 2025). Accordingly, the entire land area and population of Vĩnh Phúc Province, Hòa Bình Province and Phú Thọ Province were merged to form a new province named Phú Thọ Province.

On June 16, 2025, the Standing Committee of the National Assembly of Vietnam issued Resolution No. 1676/NQ-UBTVQH15 on the arrangement of commune-level administrative units of Phú Thọ Province in 2025 (effective from June 16, 2025). Accordingly, the entire land area and population of Kỳ Sơn Ward, Độc Lập Commune and Mông Hóa Commune were merged to form a new ward named Kỳ Sơn Ward.
