= Đào Duy Từ =

Đào Duy Từ 陶維慈
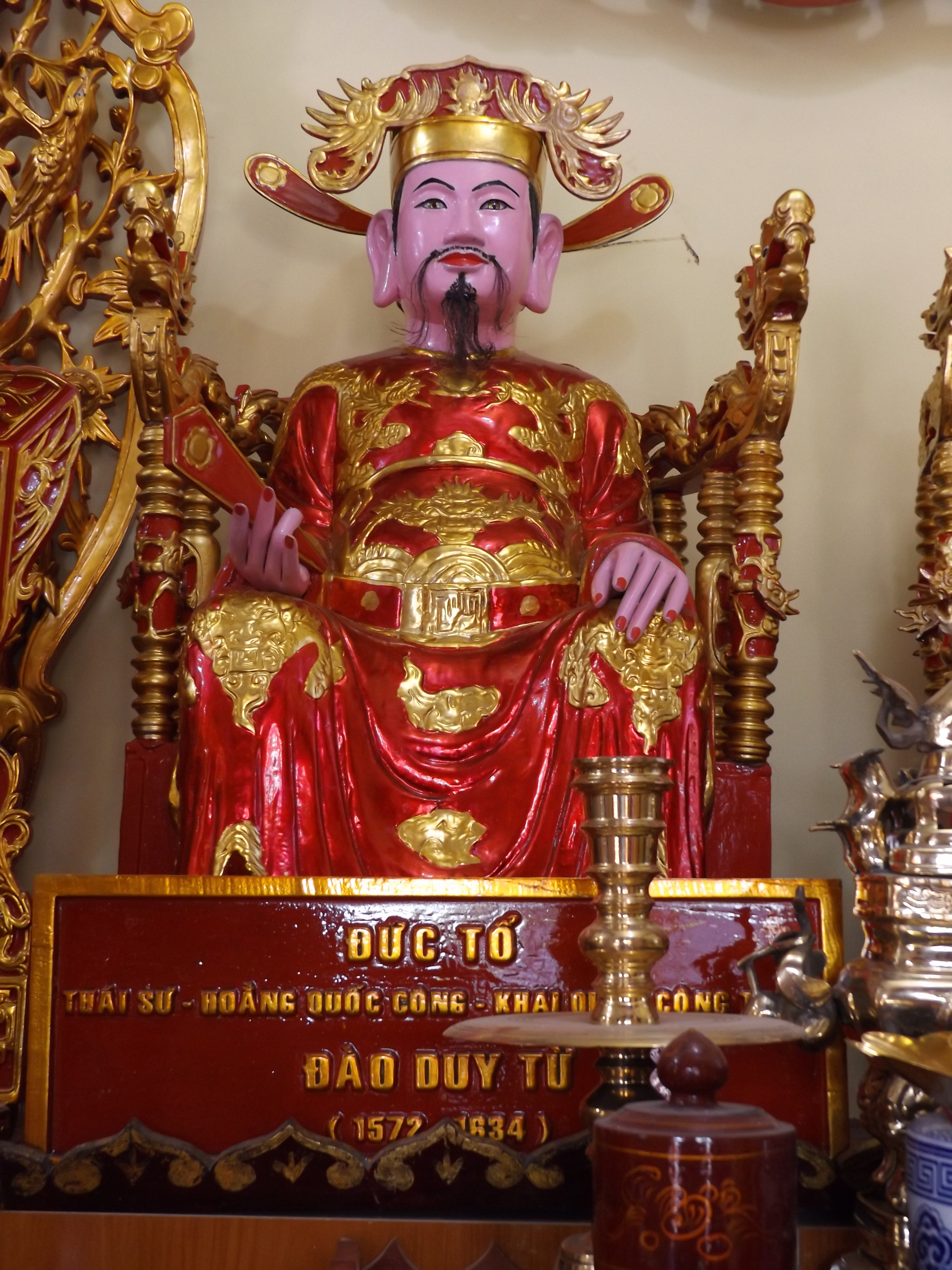
- Đào Duy Từ statue at Từ đường Đào family
- Born: 1572; Tĩnh Gia, Thanh Hóa, Đại Việt
- Died: 1634 (62–63 years old); Phú Xuân, Đại Việt
- Occupation: Official
- Writing career
- Pen name: Lộc Khê

Đào Duy Từ (1572 - December 7, 1634) was a Vietnamese scholar, poet, military adviser, and mandarin who served under the reign of Nguyễn lord Nguyễn Phúc Nguyên.

== Early life ==
Đào Duy Từ, born in Hoa Trai village, Ngọc Sơn, Lương Sơn, Hoà Bình (present day Ngọc Sơn, Lương Sơn, Lương Sơn District, Hoà Bình Province), was a son of Đào Tả Hán, a Vietnamese folk singer, who died when Từ was five years old. After this Từ was raised solely by his mother, a woman named Vũ Thị Kim Chi. When Từ was 14 years old his mother sent him to study Confucianism under a local scholar named Nguyễn Đức Khoa. Đào Duy Từ was however forbidden from taking the court examination because his father's profession as a folk singer was considered the most shameful profession under the Confucian system of the Lê dynasty.

Từ's mother managed to bribe a low-ranking mandarin named Lưu Minh Phương to change Tu's surname from Đào to Vũ which gave Từ a chance to take the court examination. In 1593, Đào Duy Từ, under the false name Vũ Duy Từ, passed his first court examination which prompted Lưu Minh Phương to demand that Từ's mother marry him as a payment for his help. Phương's demand was rejected and therefore he angrily reported the case of Đào Duy Từ to a local mandarin. Because of this Từ was expelled from the examination school while he was taking the second court examination in Thăng Long. After learning of this failure his mother blamed herself and committed suicide by cutting her throat. Both his mother's death and his failure in the examination lead to Từ becoming seriously ill. After some years of inactivity, Đào Duy Từ went south to the land of Nguyễn Lords.

== Activities in southern Vietnam ==
After arriving in southern Vietnam, Đào Duy Từ attempted to meet Lord Nguyễn Phúc Nguyên but failed. After that, Từ became a worker for a landlord named Chúc Trịnh Long in Tùng Châu (present day Bồng Sơn, Bình Định Province) in order to get close to Trần Đức Hòa, a neighbor of Chúc Trịnh Long and a mandarin of Lord Nguyễn Phúc Nguyên. This attempt was a success: after learning of Từ's ability, Trần Đức Hòa gave his daughter's hand to Đào Duy Từ and hired him as the family tutor . At this time, Từ composed a famous Vietnamese language poem, "Ngọa Long Cương Vãng" (Singing of a Lying Dragon), in which he compared himself to famous Chinese military strategist Zhuge Liang.

== Mandarin of the Nguyễn Lord ==
On an occasion when Trần Đức Hòa met Lord Nguyễn Phúc Nguyên, Hòa give the Lord the poem "Ngọa Long Cương Vãng" of Đào Duy Từ. After reading the poem, Lord Nguyễn Phúc Nguyên ordered Trần Đức Hào bring Đào Duy Từ to meet him.

Wanting to test Đào Duy Từ, the Nguyễn lord wore casual clothing and stood near a small door of Phú Xuân Palace when Đào Duy Từ first met him (these actions could be considered as a disdain by confucianist scholars during this time). Thereon Đào Duy Từ kept refusing to talk with Lord Nguyễn Phúc Nguyên until the lord opened the main gate of the palace and wore formal clothing. After a long meeting in which Đào Duy Từ discussed and gave advice about the current Trịnh–Nguyễn War, Lord Nguyễn Phúc Nguyên appeared to like Đào Duy Từ's ability and then he made Đào Duy Từ his advisor and a high ranking mandarin.

From this point on, Đào Duy Từ served as the chief military advisor, directing the construction of Nguyen's two famous strategic lines of defense: the ramparts of Lũy Thầy and Lũy Trường Dục, in northern Thuận Hóa (present day Quảng Bình Province). During the Trịnh–Nguyễn War, Lũy Thầy and Lũy Trường Dục were largely impregnable, enabling the Nguyễn lords to defend themselves against the Trịnh invasions, despite the population and army of the Nguyễn being smaller than those of the Trịnh lords.

In 1627, when these ramparts were completed, Đào Duy Từ presented a double-bottomed tray to the Lê Emperor in which he concealed the royal decree that demanded the Nguyễn lord to submit to the Lê emperors. He then carved the tray with a cryptic poem that involves a letter play, upon solving would reveal the message: 予不受勑, meaning Lord Nguyễn Phúc Nguyên does not accept the decree. He topped the tray with gifts and sent an envoy bringing it to Thăng Long. Unaware of the hidden content, Lord Trịnh Tráng accepted the tray and Tu's letter remained undiscovered until the Nguyễn envoy had fled back to the south. After learning the true meaning of Đào Duy Từ's poem; Lord Trịnh Tráng got angry and sent a large army to the south, starting the Trịnh–Nguyễn War.

== Family ==
No information regarding the family of Đào Duy Từ was recorded except that Đào Duy Từ had a daughter who married Nguyễn Hữu Tiến, one of the two most important commanders of the Nguyễn army in the Trịnh–Nguyễn War.

== Death ==
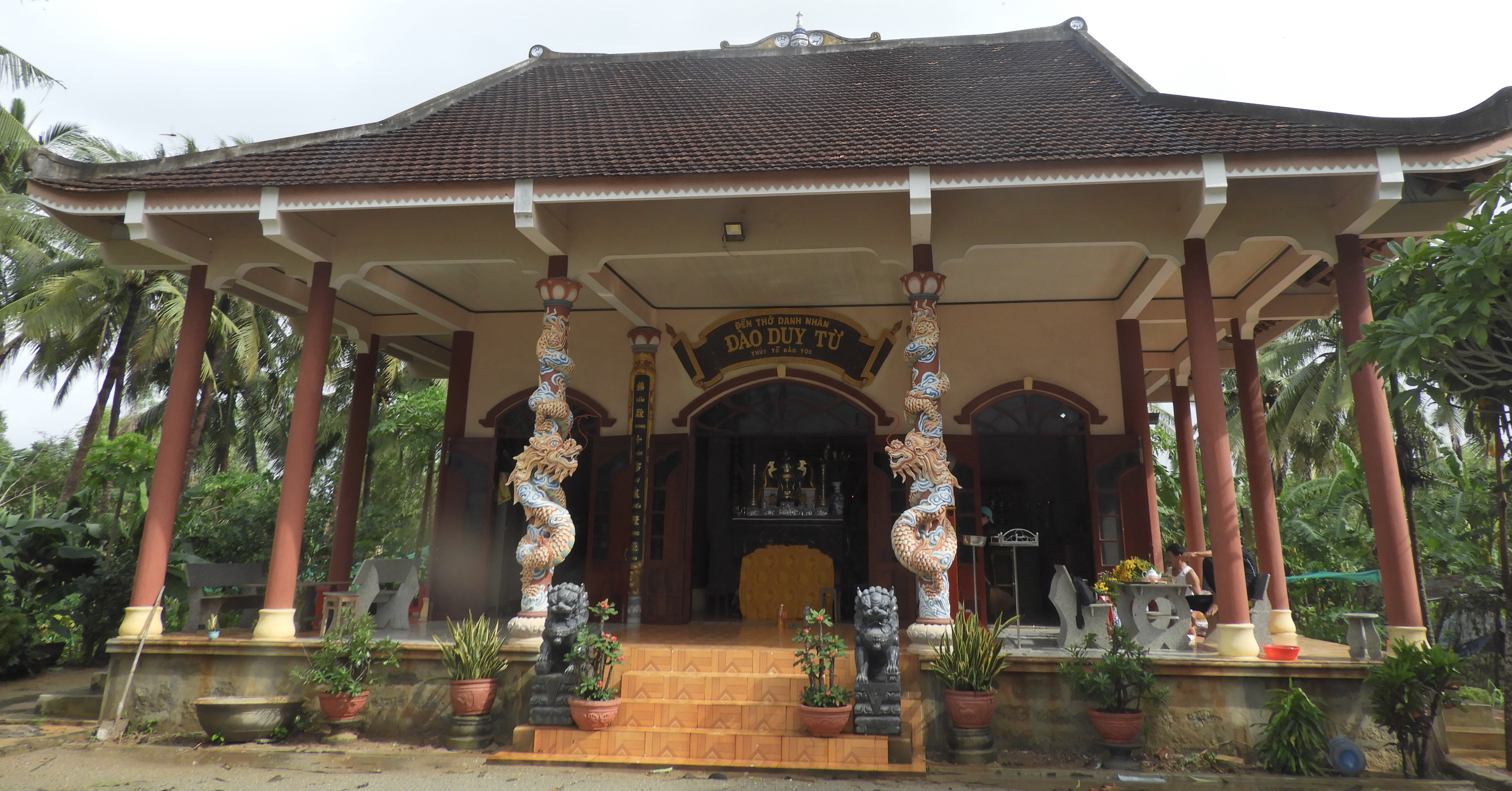
Đào Duy Từ temple in Cự Tài village, Hoài Phú commune, Hoài Nhơn district, Bình Định province

In 1633, after nine years service to the Nguyễn lords, Đào Duy Từ died of an illness. Lord Nguyễn Phúc Nguyên posthumously gave him the title of "Hiệp đồng mưu đức công thần, đặc tiến Kim tử Vinh lộc đại phu" (Common Strategist Merit-man, especially entitled as "Glorious, Fortunious and Golden Grand Scholar"). Later emperor Gia Long had Đào Duy Từ worshiped along with the Nguyễn Lords in Thế Miếu temple, the main temple of the Nguyễn emperors' ancestors in Huế. During the reign of Emperor Minh Mạng Đào Duy Từ was posthumously bestowed with the title of Hoằng Quốc Công (Duke Hằng Quốc).

Most cities in Vietnam, regardless of the political orientation of the government, have named major streets after him. Despite the ruling communist party's disapproval of the Nguyễn lords and the subsequent Nguyễn dynasty as "feudal" and "reactionary", and their renaming of streets and public facilities named after most Nguyen leaders, streets named after Đào Duy Từ remain.
