= Hòa Bình, Phú Thọ =

Hòa Bình Phường Hòa Bình
- Ward
- Hòa Bình Dam
- Interactive map of Hòa Bình
- Country: Vietnam
- Regions: Northeast
- Province: Phú Thọ Province
- Established: June 16, 2025

Area
  - Total: 39.32 km^{2} (15.18 sq mi)

Population (2025)
  - Total: 78,605
  - Density: 1,999/km^{2} (5,178/sq mi)
- Time zone: UTC+07:00 (Indochina Time)

Hòa Bình is a ward (phường) of Phú Thọ Province, Vietnam.

== Geography ==
Hòa Bình Ward located in southern Phú Thọ Province, and adjacent to:

- Kỳ Sơn Ward to the north and east
- Thống Nhất Ward to the south
- Tân Hòa Ward to the west.

== History ==
On June 12, 2025, the National Assembly of Vietnam issued Resolution No. 202/2025/QH15 on the arrangement of provincial-level administrative units (effective from June 12, 2025). Accordingly, the entire land area and population of Vĩnh Phúc Province, Hòa Bình Province and Phú Thọ Province were merged to form a new province named Phú Thọ Province.

On June 16, 2025, the Standing Committee of the National Assembly of Vietnam issued Resolution No. 1676/NQ-UBTVQH15 on the arrangement of commune-level administrative units of Phú Thọ Province in 2025 (effective from June 16, 2025). Accordingly, the entire land area and population of Đồng Tiến, Hữu Nghị, Phương Lâm, Quỳnh Lâm, Tân Thịnh, Thịnh Lang, and Trung Minh Wards were merged to form a new ward named Hòa Bình Ward.
