= An Thượng, Hanoi =

- Commune
- Interactive map of An Thượng, Hanoi
- Coordinates: 20°59′26″N 105°41′45″E
- Country: Vietnam
- City: Hanoi
- District: Hoài Đức

Area
  - Total: 2.3 sq mi (6 km^{2})

Population
  - Total: 6,600
- Time zone: UTC+07:00 (Indochina Time)

An Thuong is a former commune in the district of Hoài Đức, Hanoi, Vietnam. The chairman of this commune is Lê Văn Vinh. The commune has an area of 6 km², population in 2008 was 6,600 with a density of 1,100/km².

The overwhelming ethnic group is the Kinh people and Tanka people.

== Geography ==
An Thượng borders following communes:

- Song Phương to the north
- Vân Côn to the west
- To the south it borders:Đông La (of Hoài Đức); Tân Phú, Đại Thành (of Quốc Oai)
- An Khánh to the east
