= Hồ Đắc Điềm =

Governor of Ha Dong

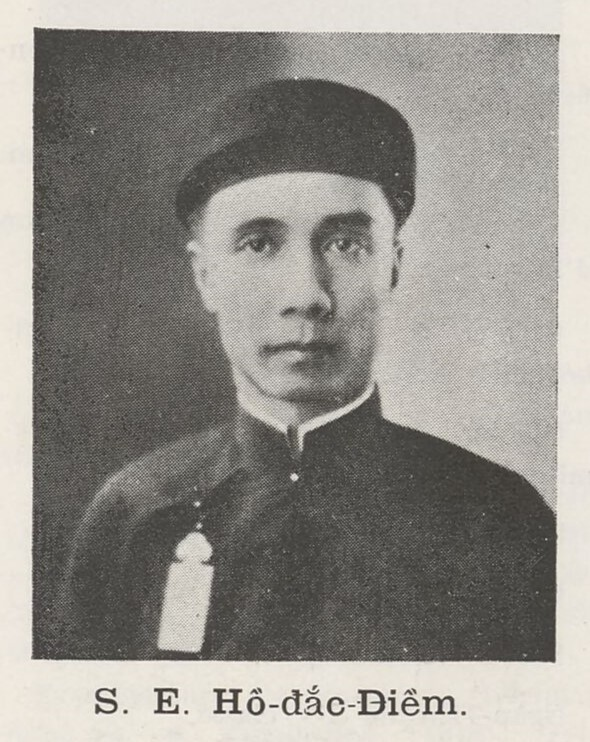
Portrait of Hồ Đắc Điềm

Hồ Đắc Điềm (1899–1985) was the governor of Ha Dong, the area surrounding Hanoi. He was also a successful lawyer and was the only non-French professor at the University of Indochina.
