= Hà Đông district =

Hà Đông Urban District Quận Hà Đông Thành phố Hà Đông
- Urban district
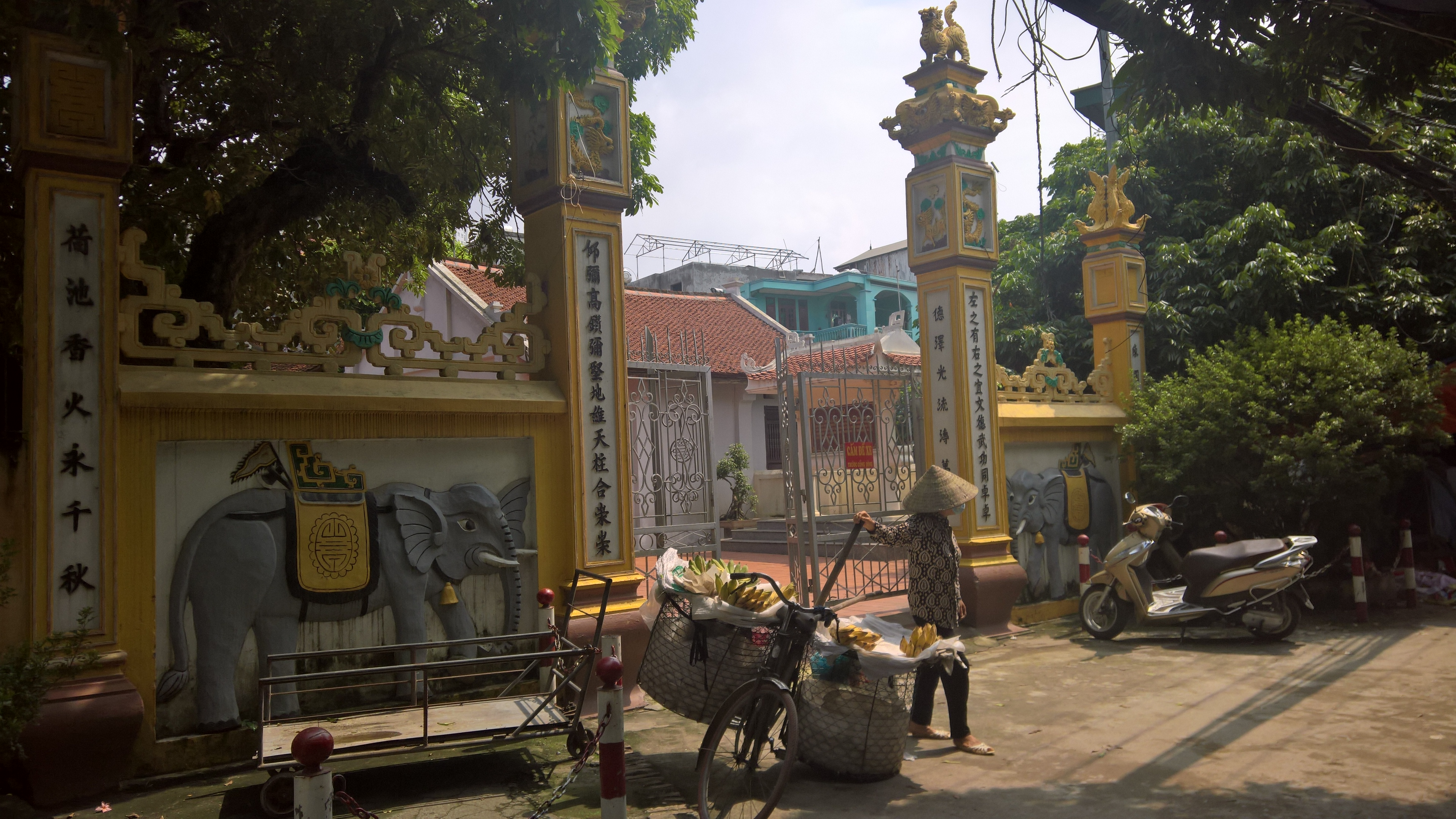
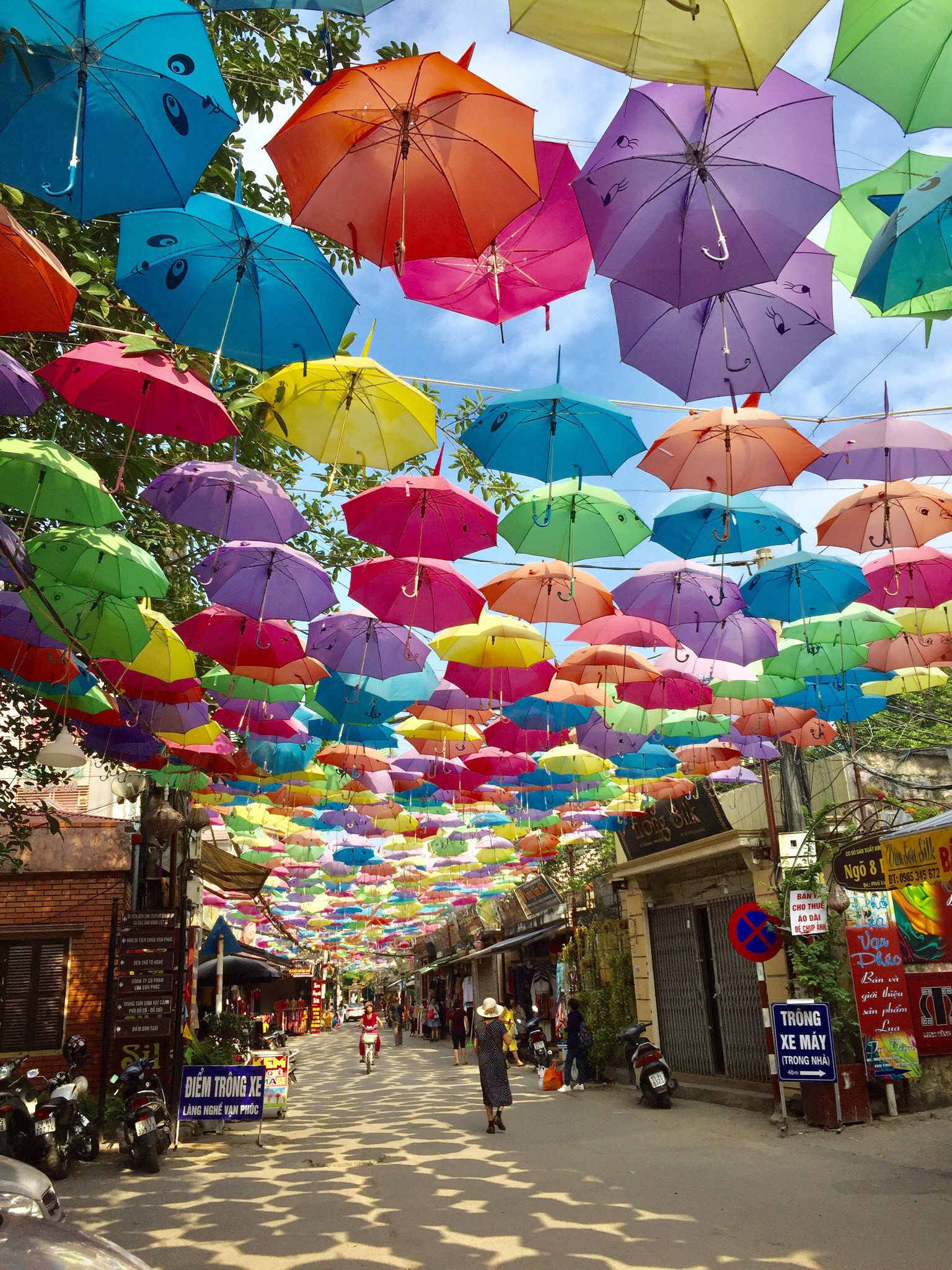
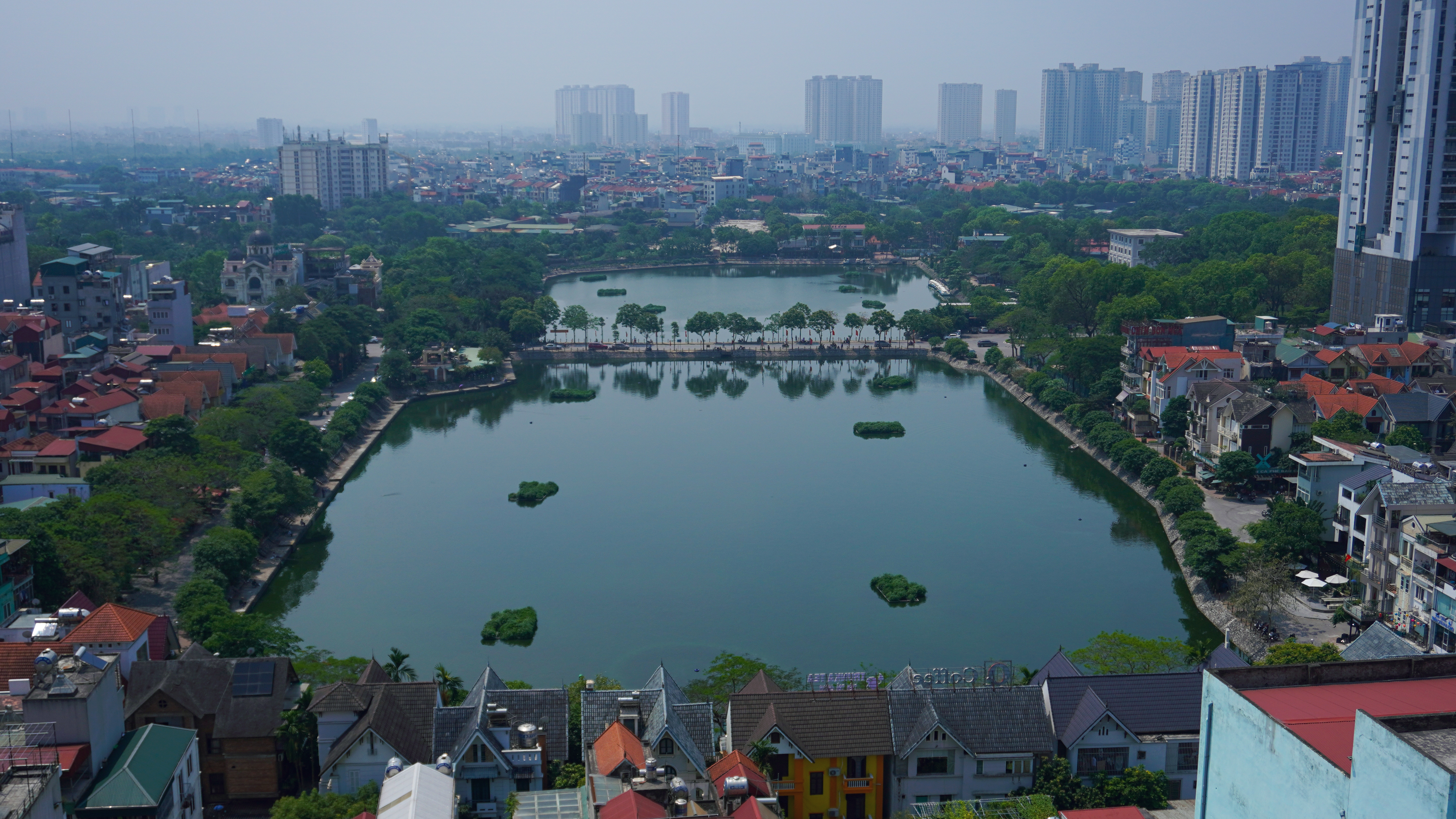
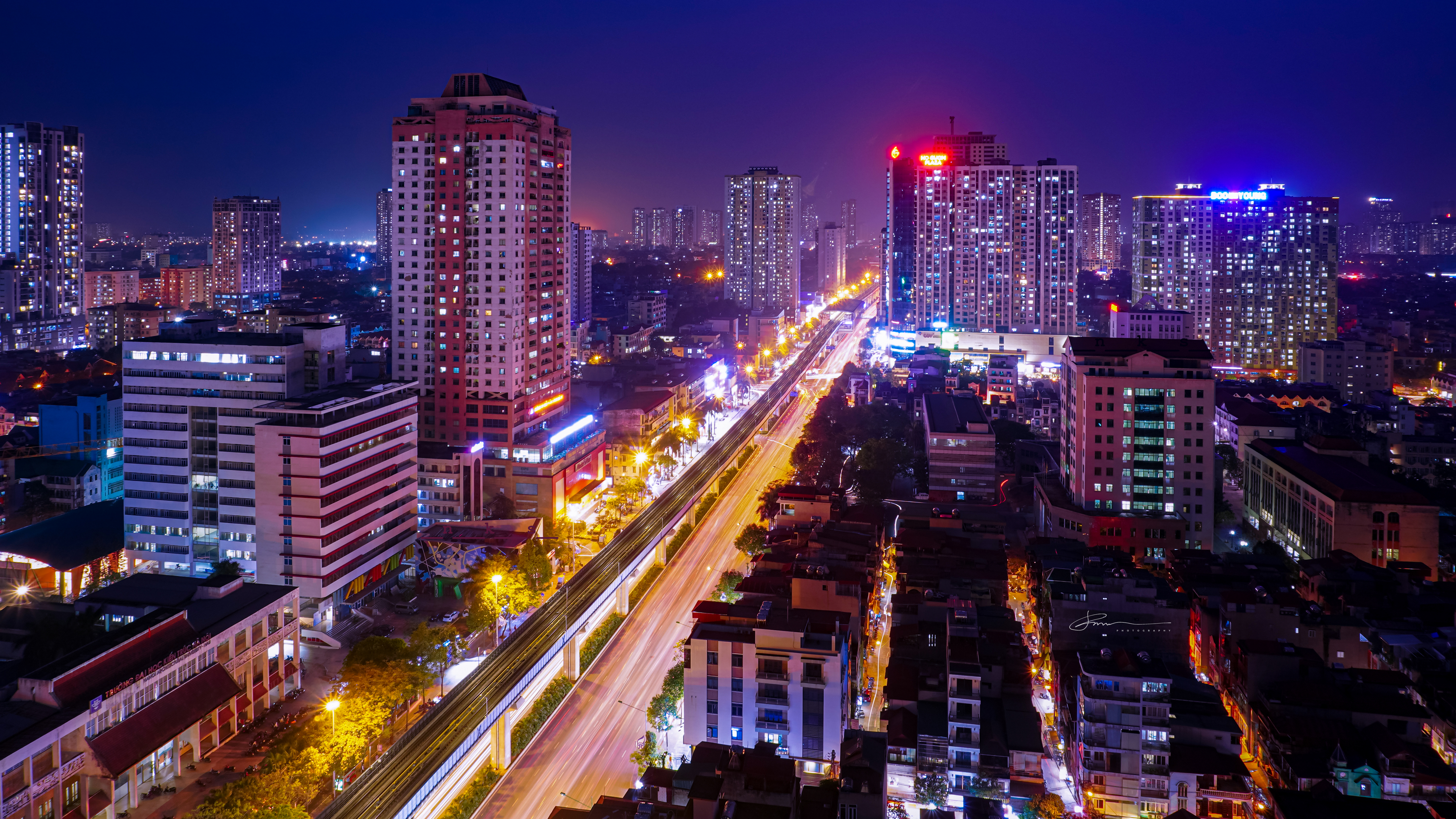
- Hà Trì Temple Vạn Phúc Village Văn Quán Lake Skyline at night on Trần Phú Street [vi] with Hanoi Metro Line 2A in the middle

- Seal
- Nicknames: "Silkland" (Quê Lụa) "Eastland" (Xứ Đông)
- Interactive map of Hà Đông Urban District
- Location within Vietnam
- Coordinates: 20°58′N 105°46′E
- Country: Vietnam
- Municipality: Hanoi
- Incorporated as a town: December 1, 1904 (town of Hà Đông province, then Hà Tây province)
- Incorporated as a city: December 27, 2006
- Incorporated as an urban district of Hanoi: May 8, 2009
- Dissolve: July 1, 2025
- Seat: Hà Cầu ward
- Wards: 17 wards

Area
  - Total: 49.64 km^{2} (19.17 sq mi)

Population (2019)
  - Total: 397,854
  - Density: 8,015/km^{2} (20,760/sq mi)
- Time zone: UTC+7 (ICT)
- Area code: 24
- Climate: Cwa

Hà Đông (lit. 'east of the river') was an urban district (quận) of Hanoi, the capital city of Vietnam. The district had 17 wards, covering a total area of 49.64 square kilometres (19.17 sq mi). As of 2019, there were 397,854 people residing in the district, the third highest of all districts in Hanoi, after Hoàng Mai. The district borders Thanh Trì district, Thanh Xuân district, Nam Từ Liêm district, Hoài Đức district, Quốc Oai district, Chương Mỹ district, Thanh Oai district.

Hà Đông has a significant number of monuments, landmarks, relics, traditional festivals and craft villages. It is an important transport hub and is also home to various government offices and universities.

Hà Đông was the capital city of the former Hà Tây province. In September 2009, it became an urban district of Hanoi follow the annexation of Hà Tây Province into Hanoi a year ago, due to the confusion of keeping Hà Đông (and Sơn Tây) in the city-status or change it as those area was promoted into city-status recently then and the government still not has laws for city under a municipality then until 2016 when municipal city is in the official administrative division.

== Wards ==
Hà Đông district is subdivided to 17 wards, including:

- Biên Giang
- Dương Nội
- Đồng Mai
- Hà Cầu
- Kiến Hưng
- Mộ Lao
- Nguyễn Trãi
- Phú La
- Phú Lãm
- Phú Lương
- Phúc La
- Quang Trung
- Trần Phú
- Vạn Phúc
- Văn Quán
- Yên Nghĩa
- Yết Kiêu

== Climate ==
Climate data for Hà Đông District
Month	Jan	Feb	Mar	Apr	May	Jun	Jul	Aug	Sep	Oct	Nov	Dec	Year
Record high °C (°F)	32.4 (90.3)	34.9 (94.8)	38.9 (102.0)	39.9 (103.8)	41.3 (106.3)	42.5 (108.5)	40.0 (104.0)	39.6 (103.3)	37.5 (99.5)	35.5 (95.9)	35.0 (95.0)	30.7 (87.3)	42.5 (108.5)
Mean daily maximum °C (°F)	19.9 (67.8)	20.8 (69.4)	23.3 (73.9)	27.5 (81.5)	31.5 (88.7)	33.4 (92.1)	33.2 (91.8)	32.4 (90.3)	31.3 (88.3)	29.2 (84.6)	25.8 (78.4)	22.1 (71.8)	27.5 (81.5)
Daily mean °C (°F)	16.5 (61.7)	17.8 (64.0)	20.3 (68.5)	24.0 (75.2)	27.1 (80.8)	29.0 (84.2)	29.1 (84.4)	28.4 (83.1)	27.2 (81.0)	24.9 (76.8)	21.6 (70.9)	18.0 (64.4)	23.7 (74.7)
Mean daily minimum °C (°F)	14.3 (57.7)	15.8 (60.4)	18.4 (65.1)	21.7 (71.1)	24.3 (75.7)	26.0 (78.8)	26.3 (79.3)	25.8 (78.4)	24.6 (76.3)	22.7 (72.9)	18.7 (65.7)	15.3 (59.5)	21.1 (70.0)
Record low °C (°F)	5.4 (41.7)	6.1 (43.0)	7.3 (45.1)	13.3 (55.9)	16.5 (61.7)	20.4 (68.7)	22.5 (72.5)	21.9 (71.4)	19.0 (66.2)	12.0 (53.6)	8.4 (47.1)	3.6 (38.5)	3.6 (38.5)
Average rainfall mm (inches)	28.2 (1.11)	26.5 (1.04)	45.0 (1.77)	83.1 (3.27)	189.4 (7.46)	232.5 (9.15)	254.6 (10.02)	293.5 (11.56)	228.8 (9.01)	184.8 (7.28)	87.4 (3.44)	36.9 (1.45)	1,687.6 (66.44)
Average rainy days	9.6	11.7	15.2	13.6	14.5	14.4	15.6	16.3	13.7	10.8	7.6	6.2	149.8
Average relative humidity (%)	83.3	85.3	86.8	88.1	85.5	82.5	82.5	85.7	86.1	82.9	81.2	80.2	84.2
Mean monthly sunshine hours	65.7	49.7	50.1	87.8	170.2	167.1	181.9	167.0	162.4	146.1	133.2	110.3	1,477.8
Source: Vietnam Institute for Building Science and Technology

== See also ==
- Hồ Đắc Điềm, past governor
- Hà Tây province, historic province
- Hanoi, capital of Vietnam
