= Kỳ Sơn district =

Kỳ Sơn District Huyện Kỳ Sơn
- District
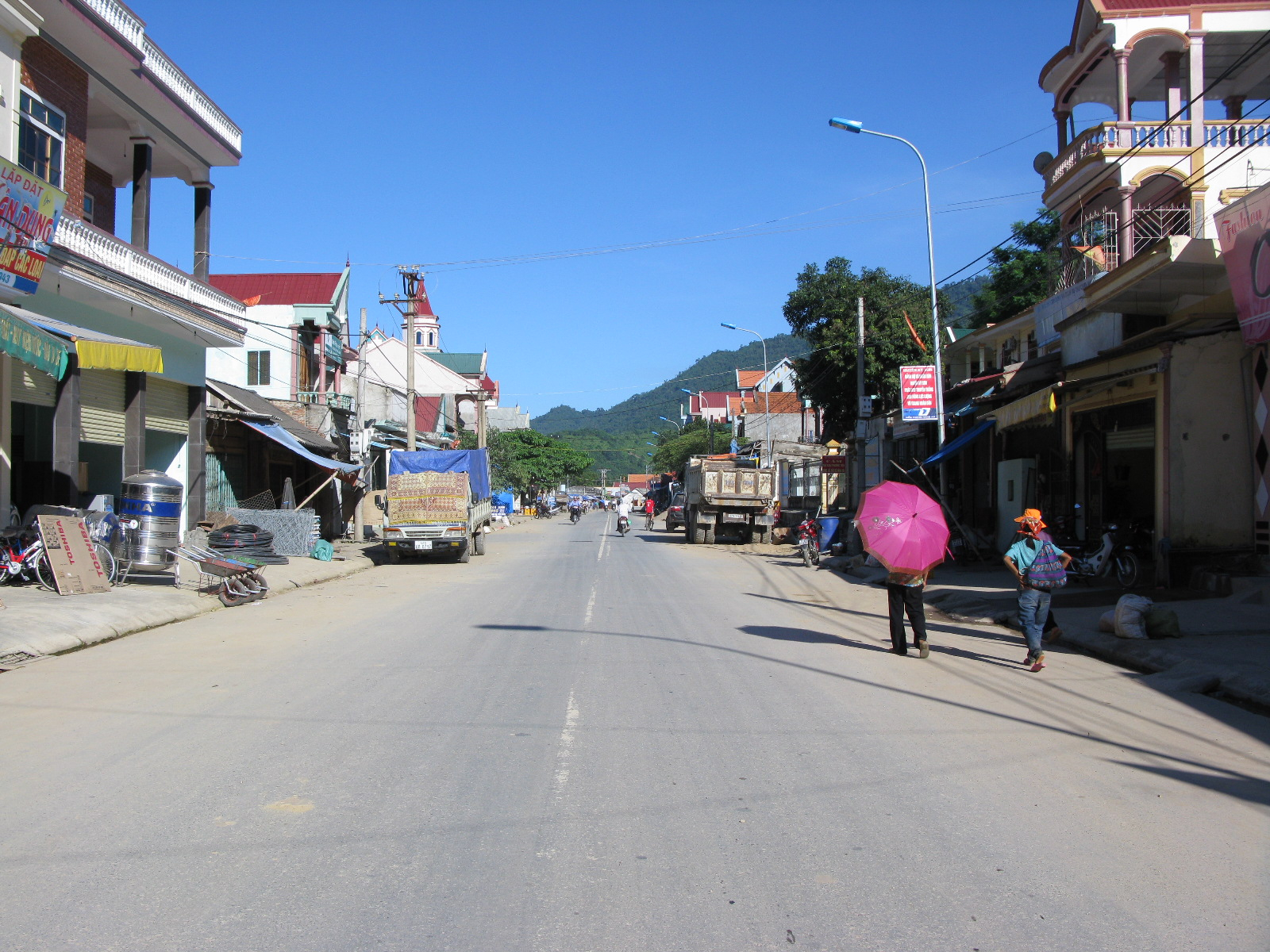
- Mường Xen street view
- Interactive map of Kỳ Sơn District
- Country: Vietnam
- Region: North Central Coast
- Province: Nghệ An
- Capital: Mường Xén

Area
  - Total: 809 sq mi (2,095 km^{2})

Population (2003)
  - Total: 63,198
- Time zone: UTC+7 (Indochina Time)

Kỳ Sơn is a rural district in western Nghệ An Province in the North Central Coast region of Vietnam. As of 2003 the district had a population of 63,198. The district covers an area of 2,095 km^{2} (809 sq mi). The district capital lies at Mường Xén.

Kỳ Sơn borders Xam Neua in the north, Nong Het and Mok May in the west, Khamkeut and Viengthong in the south, and Tương Dương in the east.

In the past, Kỳ Sơn was best known for opium poppy growing.
