= Phúc Thọ district =

Phúc Thọ district Huyện Phúc Thọ
- District
- Location within Hanoi
- Coordinates: 21.106795°N 105.538357°E
- Country: Vietnam
- Region: Red River Delta
- Municipality: Hanoi
- Central hall: Phúc Thọ township
- Time zone: UTC+7 (Indochina Time)

Phúc Thọ is a district of Hanoi, formerly of Hà Tây province, in the Red River Delta region of Vietnam.

== Geography ==
Phúc Thọ rural district is bordered by Đan Phượng district to the east, Sơn Tây town to the west, Thạch Thất district to the south, Quốc Oai district and Hoài Đức district to the southeast, Vĩnh Phúc province to the north.

The district is subdivided to 21 commune-level subdivisions, including the township of Phúc Thọ (district capital) and the rural communes of Hát Môn, Hiệp Thuận, Liên Hiệp, Long Xuyên, Ngọc Tảo, Phúc Hòa, Phụng Thượng, Sen Phương, Tam Hiệp, Tam Thuấn, Thanh Đa, Thọ Lộc, Thượng Cốc, Tích Giang, Trạch Mỹ Lộc, Vân Hà, Vân Nam, Vân Phúc, Võng Xuyên, Xuân Đình.
