= Mai Châu =

Mai Châu Commune Xã Mai Châu Thị trấn Mai Châu Huyện Mai Châu Xã Chiềng Sại
- Commune (Class-II)
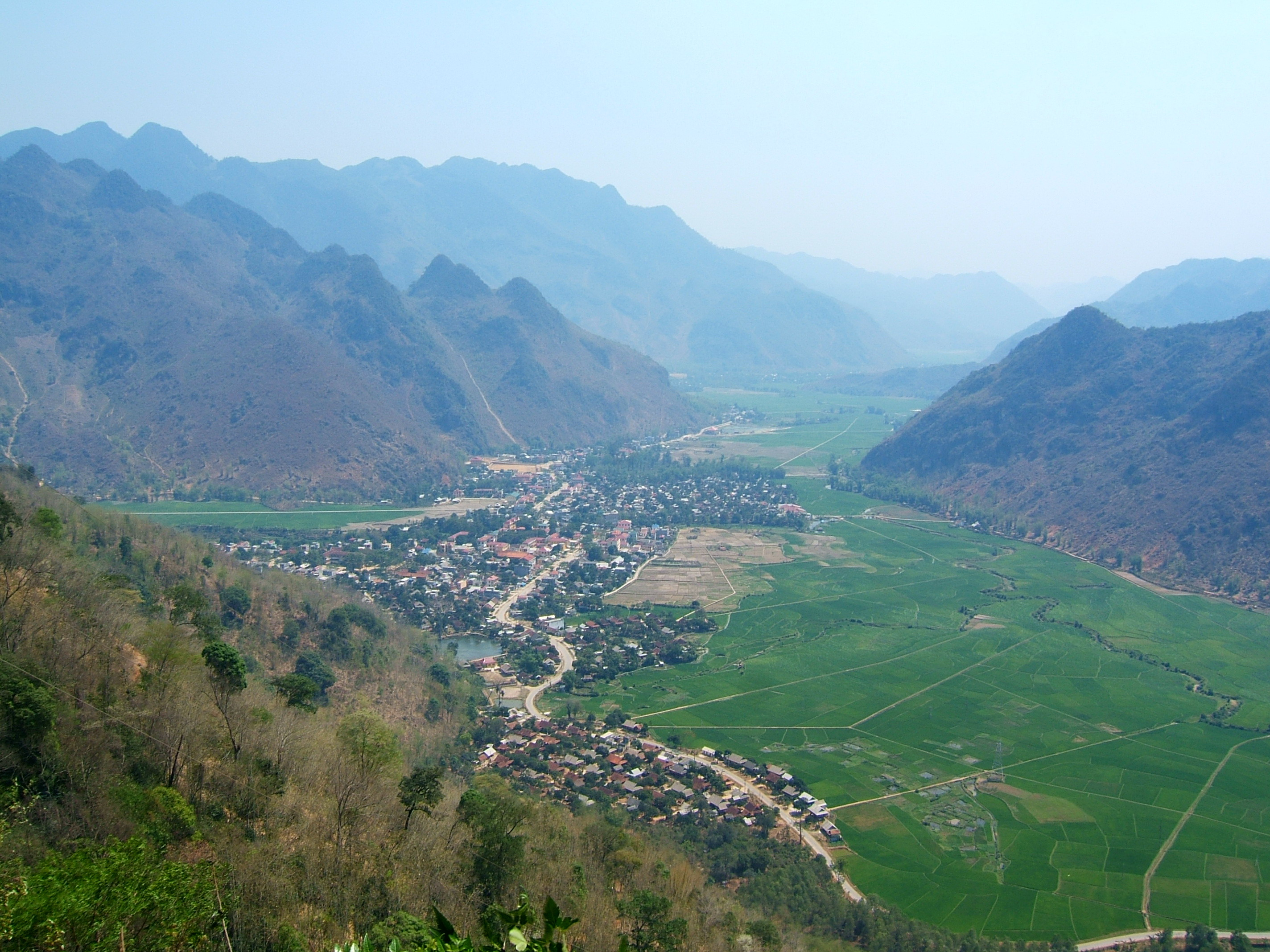
- The central valley of Mai Châu commune in 2008.

- Location within Vietnam
- Coordinates: 20°39′49″N 105°05′01″E
- Country: Vietnam
- Region: Northern Midlands and Mountains
- Province: Phú Thọ
- Establishment: May 24, 1886 (Hưng Hóa's mueang); December 26, 1992 (Hòa Bình's township); April 17, 2025 (Phú Thọ's commune)
- Central hall: Little Zone 3, National Route 15, Mai Châu Commune

Government
  - Type: Commune-level authority
  - People Committee's Chairman: Hà Văn Quang
  - People Council's chairman: (unknown)
  - Front Committee's chairman: (unknown)
  - Party Committee's Secretary: (unknown)

Area
  - Metro: 13.02 km^{2} (5.03 sq mi)

Population (2025)
  - Urban: 5,035
  - Ethnicities: Mường; Thái; Kinh; Tanka
- Time zone: UTC+7 (Indochina Time)
- ZIP code: 36426 (Note: An official code from April 17, 2025, to present.)

Mai Châu [maːj˧˥:ʨəw˧˥] is a commune of Phú Thọ province in the Northern Midlands and Mountains region of Vietnam.

== History ==
Its name Mai Châu belongs to one of the phonetic ways in Kinh language, what is Chiangsai (ຊຽງ ໄຊ, Chiềng Sại) in Tai language.

On April 17, 2025, to realize the Plan to arrange and merge administrative units in Vietnam 2024–2025 by the Government of Vietnam, the Hòa Bình Provincial People's Committee conducted an extraordinary conference. The result of the conference was a Resolution on the dissolution of all rural-district level administrative units in the whole province, followed by another Resolution on the merging of communes and the establishment of new communes with their new names.

According to the political document officially published for the press, Mai Châu township (thị trấn Mai Châu) was also dissolved. Its entire area and population have been merged with the same ones of three old communes Nà Phòn, Thành Sơn and Tòng Đậu, even five hamlets Bâng, Đồng Bảng, Phiêng Xa, Tiểu Khu and Vắt from old Đồng Tân commune. This new administrative unit is called as Mai Châu commune (xã Mai Châu), what inherits most of the cultural and historical heritage of the former rural-district level. Mai Châu commune is directly under the management of new Phú Thọ province. (Note: It includes the entire area and population of three provinces Hòa Bình, old-Phú Thọ and Vĩnh Phúc.)

== See also ==
- Bao La
- Mai Hạ
- Pà Cò
- Tân Mai
