= Thạch Thất district =

Thạch Thất district Huyện Thạch Thất
- District
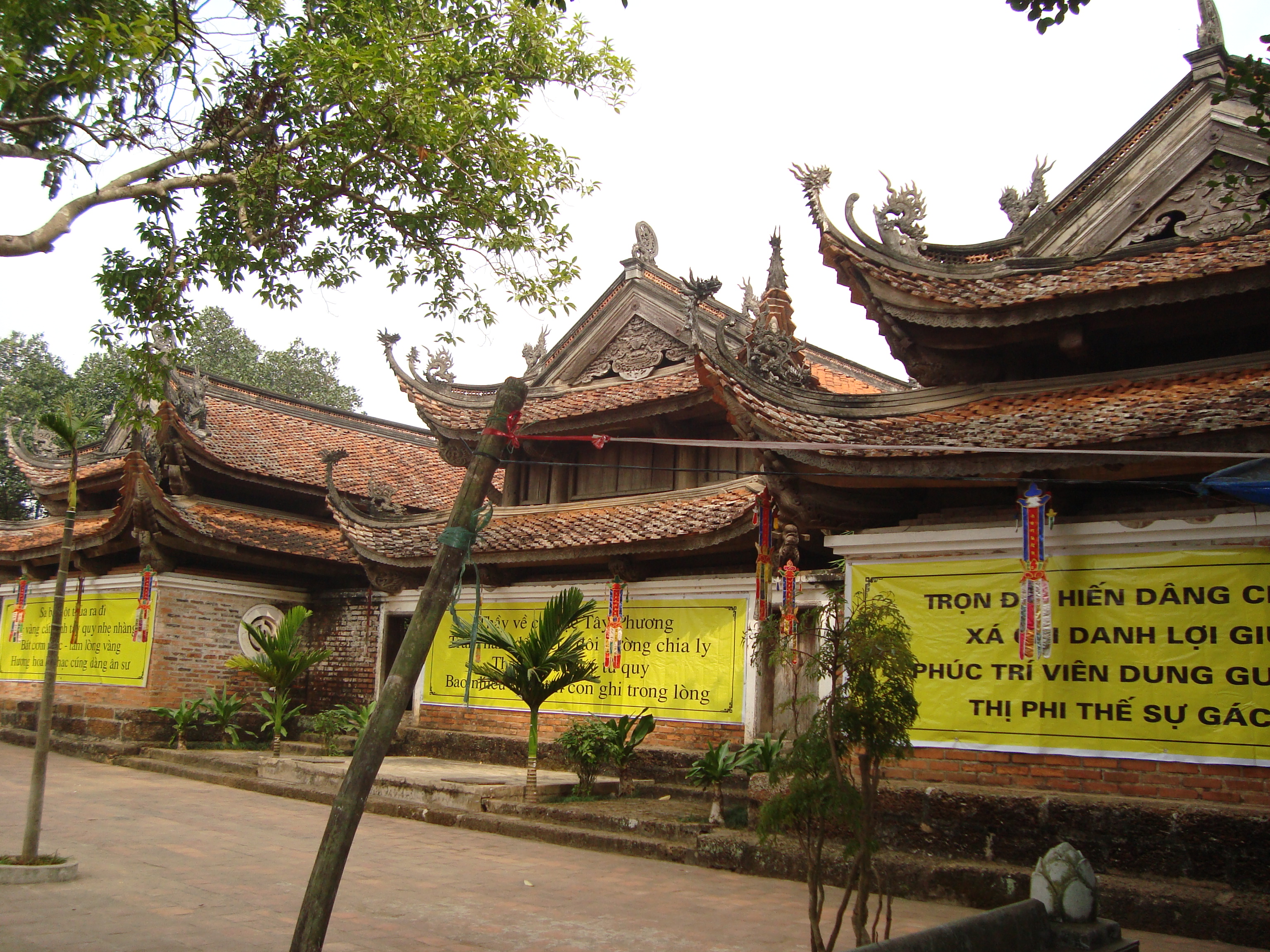
- View of Tây Phương pagoda.

- Location within Hanoi
- Coordinates: 21.056280°N 105.575883°E
- Country: Vietnam
- Region: Red River Delta
- Municipality: Hanoi
- Capital: Liên Quan
- Time zone: UTC+7 (Indochina Time)

Thạch Thất is a former district (huyện) of Hanoi in the Red River Delta region of Vietnam.

== Geography ==
Thạch Thất district is bordered by Phúc Thọ district to the east and north, Hòa Bình province to the west, Sơn Tây town and Ba Vì district to the northwest, Quốc Oai district to the south.

The district is subdivided to 20 commune-level subdivisions, including the township of Liên Quan (district capital) and the rural communes of Bình Yên, Cẩm Yên, Cần Kiệm, Đại Đồng, Đồng Trúc, Hạ Bằng, Hương Ngải, Kim Quan, Lại Thượng, Lam Sơn, Phú Kim, Phùng Xá, Quang Trung, Tân Xã, Thạch Hòa, Thạch Xá, Tiến Xuân, Yên Bình, Yên Trung.
