= Thanh Oai =

- Commune
- Center of Thanh Oai Commune
- Interactive map of Thanh Oai
- Coordinates: 20.85362567676118°N 105.76941659807675°E
- Country: Vietnam
- Region: Red River Delta
- Municipality: Hanoi
- Administrative headquarters: 135 Kim Bài Street

Area
  - Total: 26.86 km^{2} (10.37 sq mi)

Population (2025)
  - Total: 54,475
  - Density: 2,028/km^{2} (5,250/sq mi)
- Website: thanhoai.hanoi.gov.vn

Thanh Oai is a commune in the municipality of Hanoi, Vietnam.

On 16 June 2025, district-level administrative units nationwide ceased to operate.

On the same date, the Standing Committee of the National Assembly of Vietnam issued Resolution No. 1656/NQ-UBTVQH15 on the arrangement of commune-level administrative units in Hanoi in 2025. Under the resolution, the entire area and population of Kim Bài township, Đỗ Động, Kim An, Phương Trung, and Thanh Mai communes, together with part of Kim Thư Commune, formerly part of Thanh Oai district, were merged to form a new commune named Thanh Oai.
