= Chương Mỹ district =

Chương Mỹ district Huyện Chương Mỹ
- District
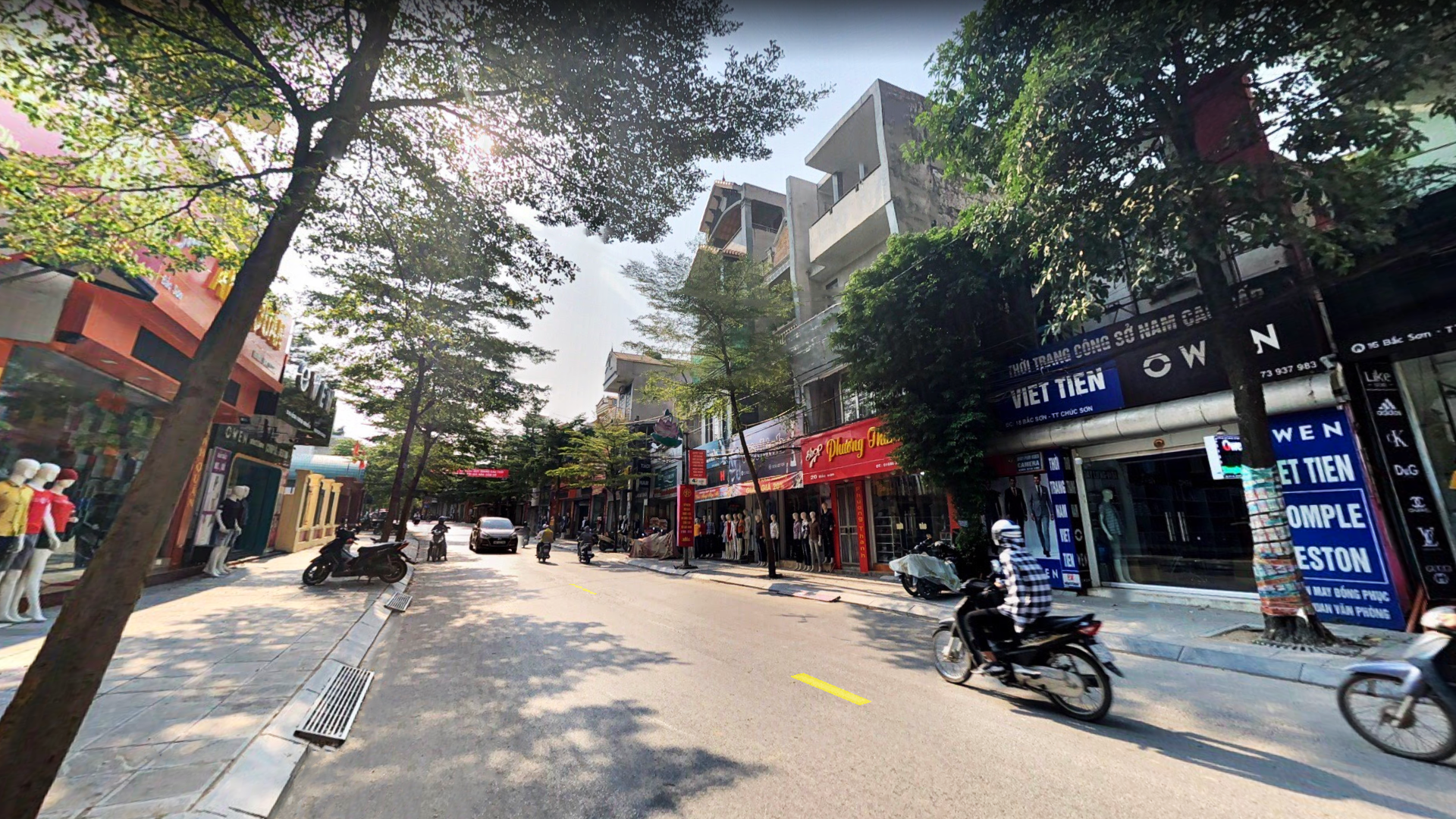
- A road in Chúc Sơn township.

- Location within Hanoi
- Coordinates: 20.924122°N 105.704120°E
- Country: Vietnam
- Region: Red River Delta
- Municipality: Hanoi
- Central agency: Chúc Sơn township
- Time zone: UTC+7 (Indochina Time)

Chương Mỹ is a former district (huyện) of Hanoi in the Red River Delta region of Vietnam.

== Geography ==
Chương Mỹ district is bordered by Hà Đông district and Thanh Oai district to the east, Hòa Bình province to the west, Mỹ Đức district and Ứng Hòa district to the south, Quốc Oai district to the north.

The district is the site of the Battle of Tốt Động – Chúc Động in 1426 which secured Vietnam's independence from Ming China. Tốt Động and Chúc Động are two villages 6 km apart. Trẩm Mountain is situated in Long Châu hamlet, Phụng Châu, 20 km from Hanoi.

Chương Mỹ district is subdivided to 32 commune-level subdivisions, including the two townships of Chúc Sơn (district capital), Xuân Mai and the rural communes of: Đại Yên, Đông Phương Yên, Đông Sơn, Đồng Lạc, Đồng Phú, Hòa Chính, Hoàng Diệu, Hoàng Văn Thụ, Hồng Phong, Hợp Đồng, Hữu Văn, Lam Điền, Mỹ Lương, Nam Phương Tiến, Ngọc Hòa, Phú Nam An, Phú Nghĩa, Phụng Châu, Quảng Bị, Tân Tiến, Thanh Bình, Thụy Hương, Thủy Xuân Tiên, Thượng Vực, Tiên Phương, Tốt Động, Trần Phú, Trung Hòa, Trường Yên, Văn Võ.
