= Vân Canh =

Vân Canh Xã Vân Canh
- Commune
- Vân Canh commune
- Location within Vietnam
- Coordinates: 13°37′36″N 108°59′44″E
- Country: Vietnam
- Region: South Central Coast
- Province: Gia Lai
- Time zone: UTC+7 (UTC + 7)

Vân Canh is a commune (xã) of Gia Lai Province, Vietnam. It is one of the 135 new wards and communes of the province following the reorganization in 2025.

On June 16, 2025, the Standing Committee of the National Assembly issued Resolution No. 1660/NQ-UBTVQH15 on the reorganization of commune-level administrative units in Gia Lai Province in 2025 (the resolution took effect on the date of its adoption). Accordingly, the entire natural area and population of Vân Canh Township, Canh Thuận Commune, and Canh Hòa Commune, together with a part of the natural area and population of Canh Hiệp Commune, were consolidated to establish a new commune named Vân Canh Commune.
