= Hòa Phú =

Hòa Phú may refer to the following places in Vietnam:

- Hòa Phú, Bình Dương, ward of Thủ Dầu Một in Bình Dương Province
- Hòa Phú, Da Nang, rural commune of Hòa Vang District, Da Nang
