= Lương Sơn =

Lương Sơn Commune Xã Lương Sơn Xa̭ Lương Xơn Thị trấn Lương Sơn Thị trấn Nông Trường Cửu Long Xã Hùng Sơn
- Commune (Class-II)
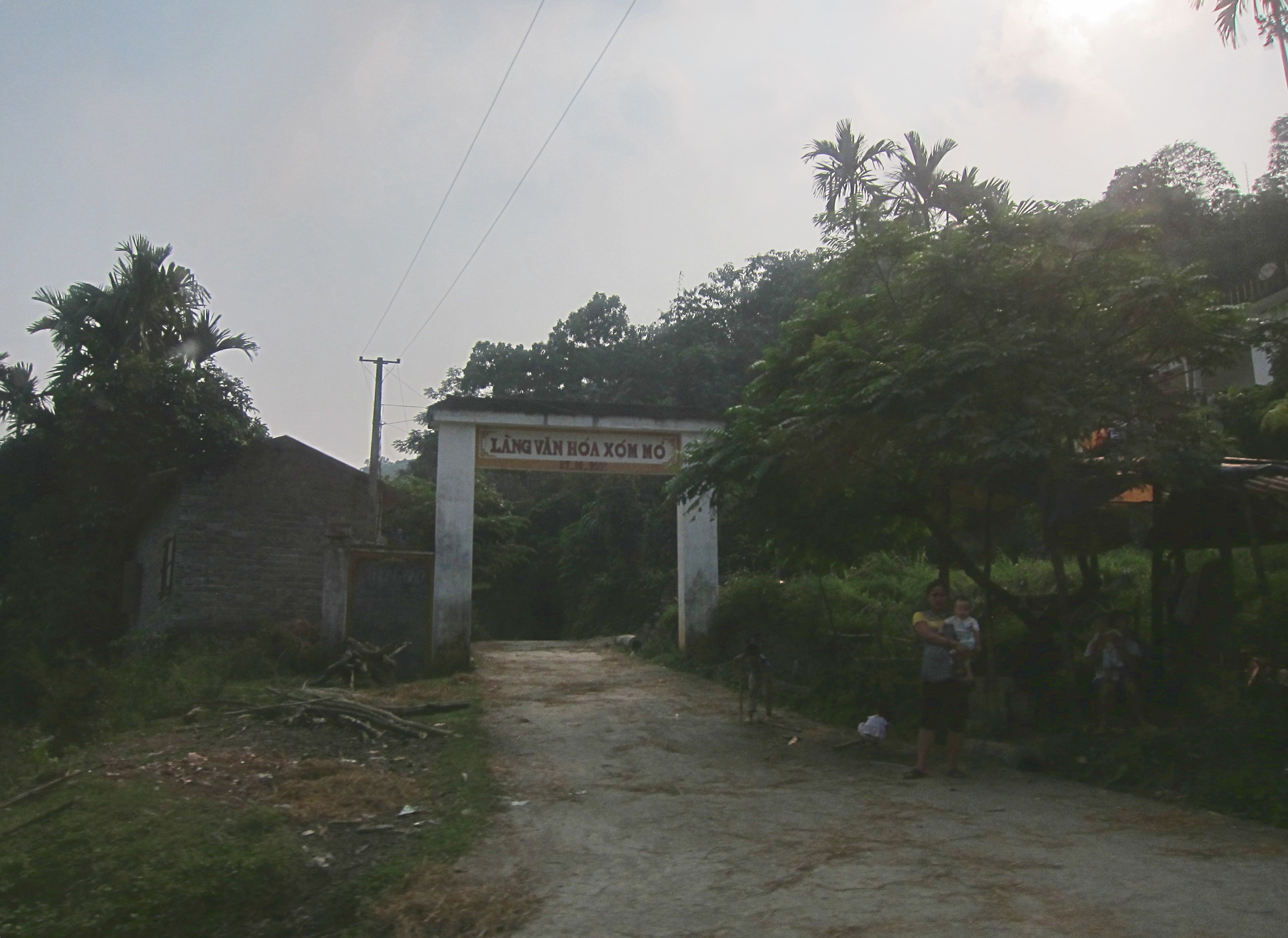
- Gate of Mơ Cultural Village.
- Nickname: "Perfumedland" (Miền thơm hương)
- Motto: "Glow a hometown" (Rực sáng một vùng quê)
- Interactive map of Lương Sơn Commune
- Coordinates: 20.867°N 105.500°E
- Country: Vietnam
- Region: Northern Midlands and Mountains
- Province: Phú Thọ
- Establishment: November 1, 1880 (market); September 6, 1986 (township); April 17, 2025 (commune)
- Central hall: No.543, Trần Phú road, Lương Sơn commune

Government
  - Type: Commune-level authority

Area
  - Total: 369.85 km^{2} (142.80 sq mi)

Population (2019)
  - Total: 99,457
  - Density: 268.91/km^{2} (696.48/sq mi)
  - Ethnicities: Mươ̒ng (90%); Kinh (6.3%); Yao (3.7%)
- Time zone: UTC+7 (Indochina Time)
- ZIP code: 36250 (Note: An official code from 2020 to present.)
- Website: Luongson.Phutho.gov.vn; Luongson.Phutho.dcs.vn

Lương Sơn (Mươ̒ng: Xa̭ Lương Xơn, Kinh: Xã Lương Sơn) is a commune of Phú Thọ province in the Northern Midlands and Mountains region of Vietnam created in 2025.

== History ==
On April 17, 2025, to meet the urgent needs of the Policy to Arrange and Merge Administrative Units by the Government of Vietnam, the Hòa Bình Provincial People's Committee have promoted an extraordinary conference. The result of the conference was a Resolution on the dissolution of all rural-district level administrative units in the whole province, followed by another Resolution on the merging of communes and the establishment of new communes with their new names.

According to the political document officially published for the media, Lương Sơn township (Thi̭ chấn Lương Xơn, thị trấn Lương Sơn) was also dissolved. Its entire area and demography have been merged with the same ones of :

- A part of former Cao Sơn.
- Four former communes Hòa Sơn, Lâm Sơn, Nhuận Trạch, and Tân Vinh.

This new administrative unit is called as Lương Sơn commune (xa̭ Lương Xơn, xã Lương Sơn), what inherits most of the cultural and historical heritage of the former rural-district level. Lương Sơn commune is directly under the management of new Phú Thọ province. (Note: It includes the entire area and population of three provinces Hòa Bình, old-Phú Thọ and Vĩnh Phúc.)
