= Cao Phong =

- Commune
- Location within Vietnam
- Coordinates: 20°42′57″N 105°19′26″E
- Country: Vietnam
- Region: Northwest
- Province: Phú Thọ
- Time zone: UTC+7 (UTC + 7)

Cao Phong is a commune of Phú Thọ Province, in the northwestern region of Vietnam.

On June 16, 2025, the Standing Committee of the National Assembly issued Resolution No. 1680/NQ-UBTVQH15 on the reorganization of commune-level administrative units in Phú Thọ Province in 2025. Accordingly, Cao Phong Town, Hợp Phong Commune, and Thu Phong Commune were merged to form a new commune named Cao Phong Commune.
