= Đà Bắc =

Đà Bắc Xã Đà Bắc
- Commune
- Location within Vietnam
- Coordinates: 20°52′35″N 105°15′12″E
- Country: Vietnam
- Region: Northwest
- Province: Phú Thọ
- Time zone: UTC+7 (UTC + 7)

Đà Bắc is a commune (xã) of Phú Thọ Province, Vietnam.
