= Ứng Hòa district =

Ứng Hòa district Huyện Ứng Hòa
- District
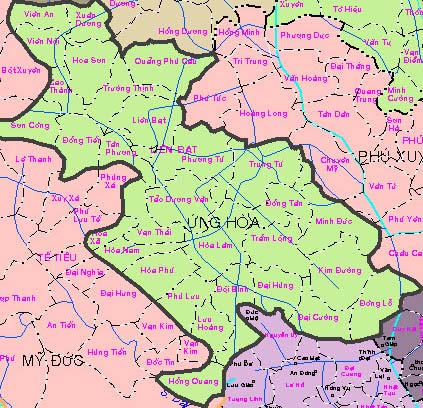
- Map of Ứng Hòa District

- Location within Hanoi
- Coordinates: 20.734854°N 105.770701°E
- Country: Vietnam
- Province: Hanoi
- Number of towns: 1
- Number of communes: 28
- Capital: Vân Đình

Area
  - Total: 183.72 km^{2} (70.93 sq mi)

Population (2005)
  - Total: 193,731
- Time zone: UTC+7 (ICT)

Ứng Hòa is a former southern district (huyện) of Hanoi in the Red River Delta region of Vietnam.

== Geography ==
The River Đáy forms much of the western boundary with Mỹ Đức district. It covers an area of 183.72 square kilometres (70.93 sq mi), and as of 2005 it had a population of 193,731 people. It has 28 communes and one town.

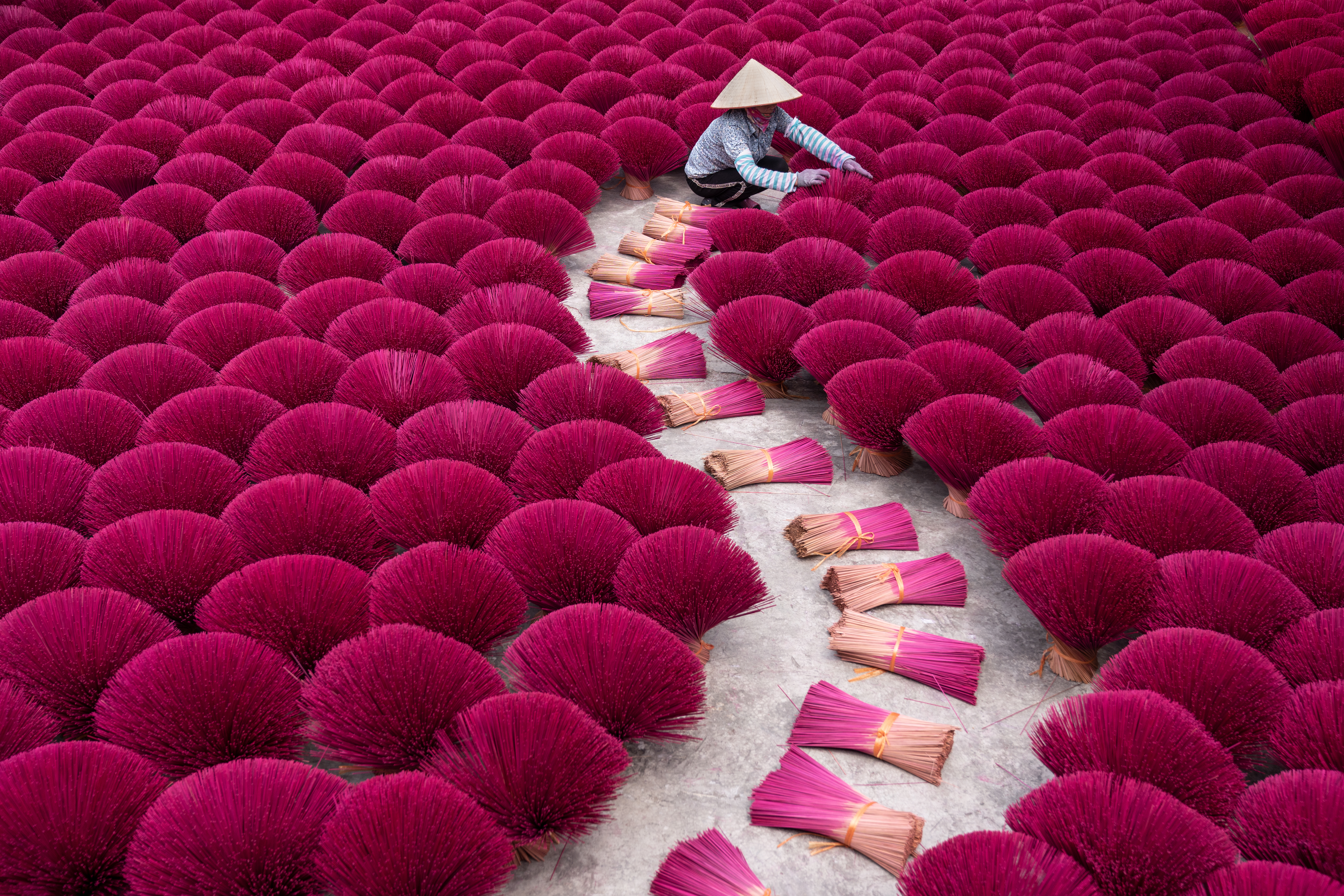
Incense production in Quảng Phú Cầu village, Ứng Hoà district

== Administrative divisions ==
The district contains the following subdivisions:

- Vân Đình (township)

Communes:

- Đại Hùng
- Đồng Tân
- Hòa Lâm
- Hòa Xá
- Liên Bạt
- Phù Lưu
- Sơn Công
- Trung Tú
- Viên An
- Cao Thành
- Đội Bình
- Đồng Tiến
- Hòa Nam
- Hồng Quang
- Lưu Hoàng
- Phương Tú
- Tảo Dương Văn
- Trường Thịnh
- Viên Nội
- Đại Cường
- Đông Lỗ
- Hoa Sơn
- Hòa Phú
- Kim Đường
- Minh Đức
- Quảng Phú Cầu
- Trầm Lộng
- Vạn Thá

== Notable people ==
- Trịnh Tố Tâm (born 1945, Đồng Tân – died 1996), a PAVN soldier stated to have personally killed 272 enemy soldiers during the Vietnam War.
