= Hoài Đức district =

Hoài Đức district Huyện Hoài Đức
- District
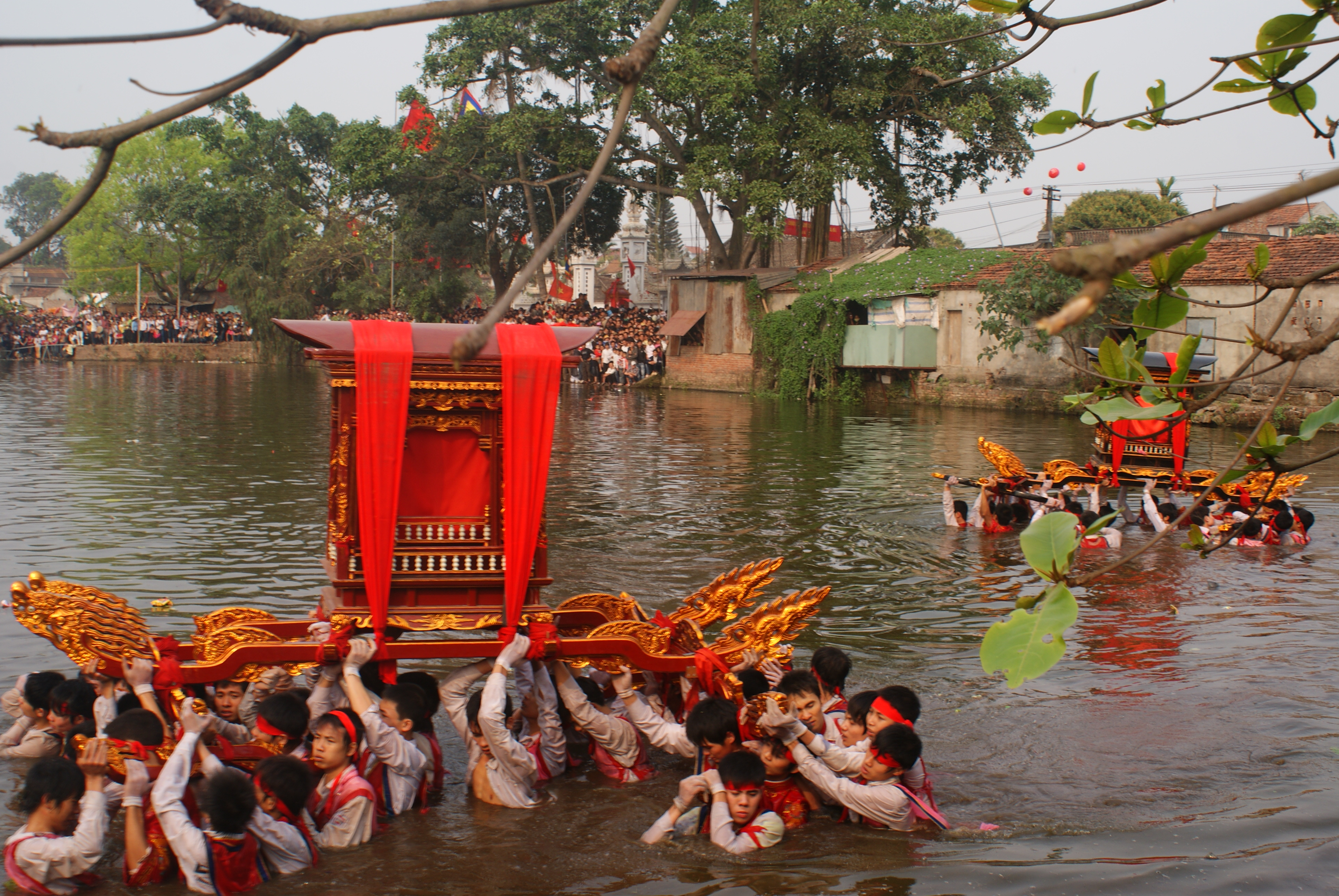
- Procession of Saints through the village pond
- Interactive map of Hoài Đức district
- Location within Hanoi Location within Vietnam Location within Southeast Asia Location within Asia
- Coordinates: 21.069854°N 105.707735°E
- Country: Vietnam
- Region: Red River Delta
- Municipality: Hanoi
- Capital: Trạm Trôi

Area
  - Total: 3,279 sq mi (8,493 km^{2})

Population (December 31, 2020)
  - Total: 276.070
  - Density: 8.4/sq mi (3.25/km^{2})
- Time zone: UTC+7 (Indochina Time)
- Website: hoaiduc.hanoi.gov.vn

Hoài Đức is a rural district (huyện) of Hanoi in the Red River Delta region of Vietnam.

== Geography ==
Hoài Đức district is bordered by the urban districts of Bắc Từ Liêm and Nam Từ Liêm to the east, the districts of Quốc Oai and Phúc Thọ to the west, Hà Đông district to the south and Đan Phượng district to the north.

== Divisions ==
The is subdivided to 20 commune-level subdivisions, including the township of Trạm Trôi (district capital) and the rural communes of: An Khánh, An Thượng, Cát Quế, Di Trạch, Dương Liễu, Đắc Sở, Đông La, Đức Giang, Đức Thượng, Kim Chung, La Phù, Lại Yên, Minh Khai, Song Phương, Sơn Đồng, Tiền Yên, Vân Canh, Vân Côn, Yên Sở.
