= Sơn Tây, Hanoi =

Sơn Tây Phường Sơn Tây
- Ward
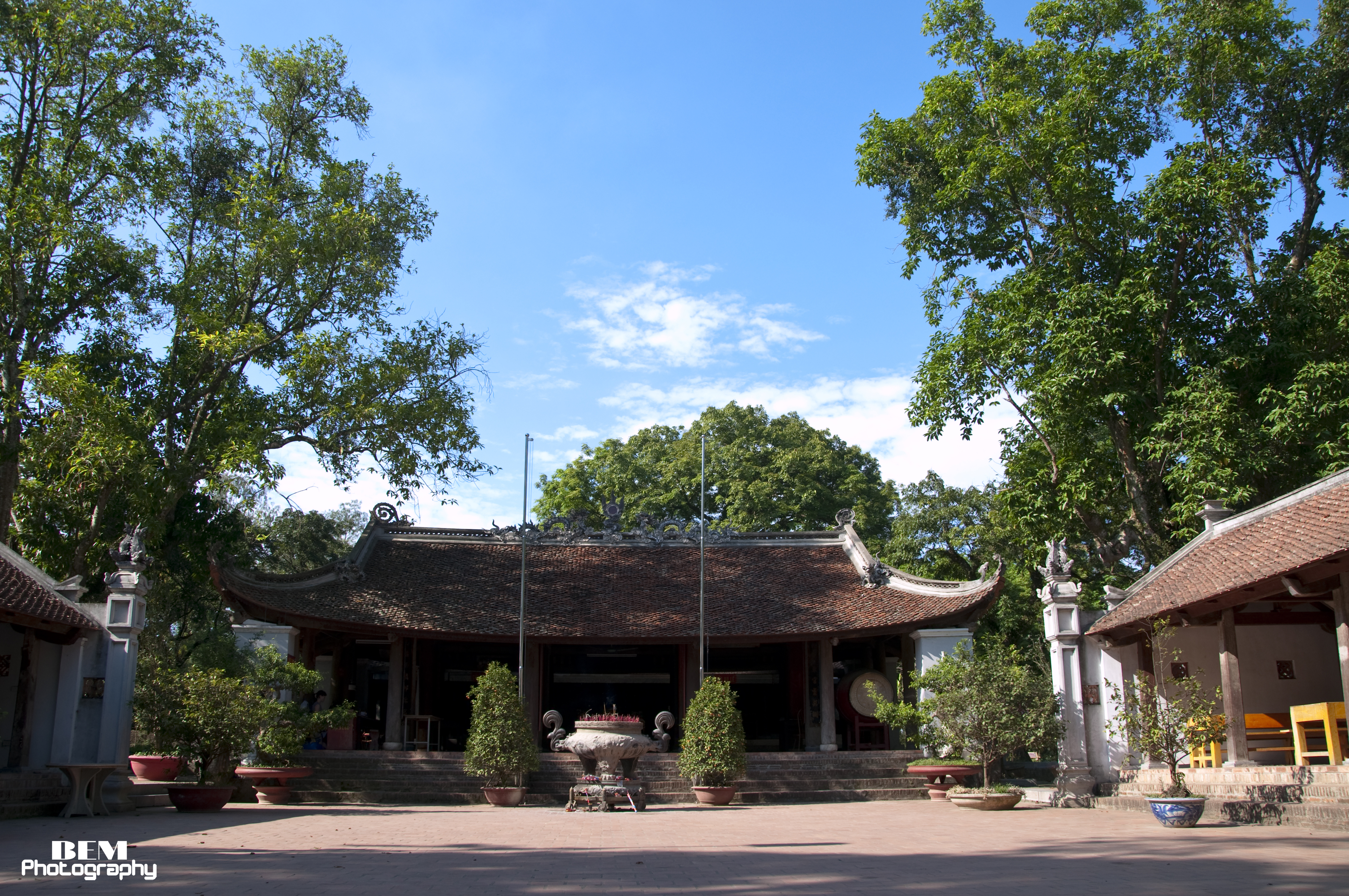
- Và Temple in Sơn Tây
- Interactive map of Sơn Tây
- Coordinates: 21°08′27.23″N 105°30′24.25″E
- Country: Vietnam
- Municipality: Hanoi
- Established: June 16, 2025

Area
  - Total: 8.91 sq mi (23.08 km^{2})

Population (2024)
  - Total: 71,301
  - Density: 8,001/sq mi (3,089/km^{2})
- Time zone: UTC+07:00 (Indochina Time)
- Administrative code: 09574

Sơn Tây (Vietnamese: Phường Sơn Tây) is a ward of Hanoi, Vietnam. It is one of the 126 new wards, communes and special zones of the province following the reorganization in 2025.

== History ==
On June 16, 2025, the National Assembly Standing Committee issued Resolution No. 1656/NQ-UBTVQH15 on the arrangement of commune-level administrative units of Nghệ An province in 2025 (effective from June 16, 2025). Accordingly, the entire land area and population of Ngô Quyền, Phú Thịnh, Viên Sơn wards, Đường Lâm commune and part of Trung Hưng, Sơn Lộc wards, Thanh Mỹ commune of the former Sơn Tây town will be integrated into a new ward named Sơn Tây (Clause 50, Article 1).
