= Quốc Oai district =

Quốc Oai district Huyện Quốc Oai
- District
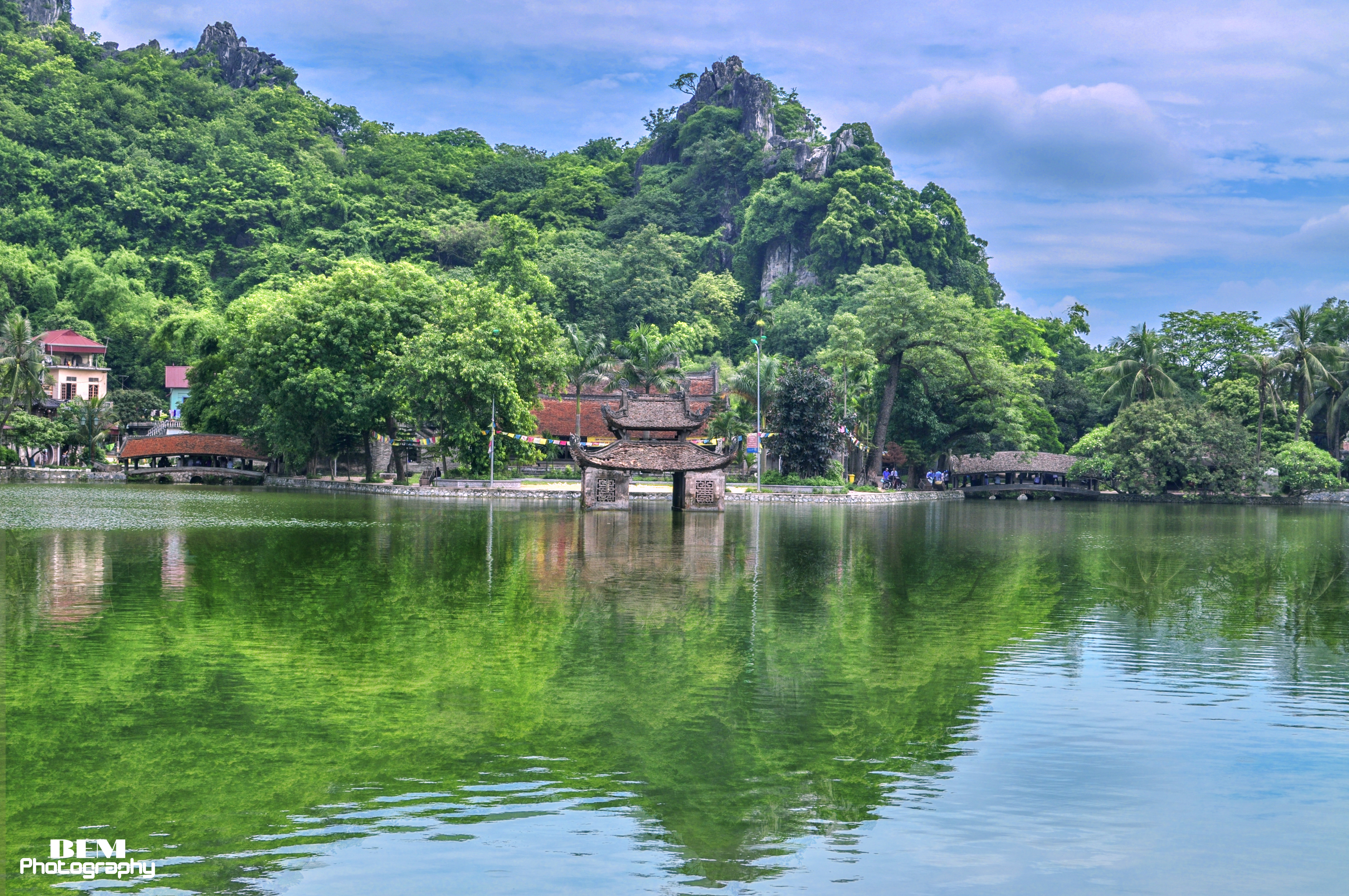
- Thầy Pagoda

- Seal

- Location within Hanoi
- Coordinates: 20.991629°N 105.642635°E
- Country: Vietnam
- Region: Red River Delta
- Municipality: Hanoi
- Capital: Quốc Oai
- Time zone: UTC+7 (Indochina Time)

Quốc Oai is a district (huyện) of Hanoi in the Red River Delta region of Vietnam.

Quốc Oai district is bordered by Hoài Đức district to the east, Hòa Bình province to the west, Chương Mỹ district to the south, Thạch Thất district and Phúc Thọ district to the north.

The district is subdivided to 21 commune-level subdivisions, including the township of Quốc Oai (district capital) and the rural communes of Cấn Hữu, Cộng Hòa, Đại Thành, Đồng Quang, Đông Xuân, Đông Yên, Hòa Thạch, Liệp Tuyết, Nghĩa Hương, Ngọc Liệp, Ngọc Mỹ, Phú Cát, Phú Mãn, Phượng Cách, Sài Sơn, Tân Hòa, Tân Phú, Thạch Thán, Tuyết Nghĩa, Yên Sơn.

== Culture ==
Thầy Pagoda rests at the foot of Sài Sơn Mountain, Quốc Oai District. Along with Tây Phương Pagoda, Hương Temple, they are the most sacred religious sites in the outskirts of Hanoi.

Established in the 11th century during the Lý dynasty, Thầy Pagoda is closely associated with Zen Master Từ Đạo Hạnh, a revered monk known for his spiritual teachings and contributions to Vietnamese Buddhism.
