= Lương Sơn district =

Lương Sơn district Huyện Lương Sơn
- Rural district
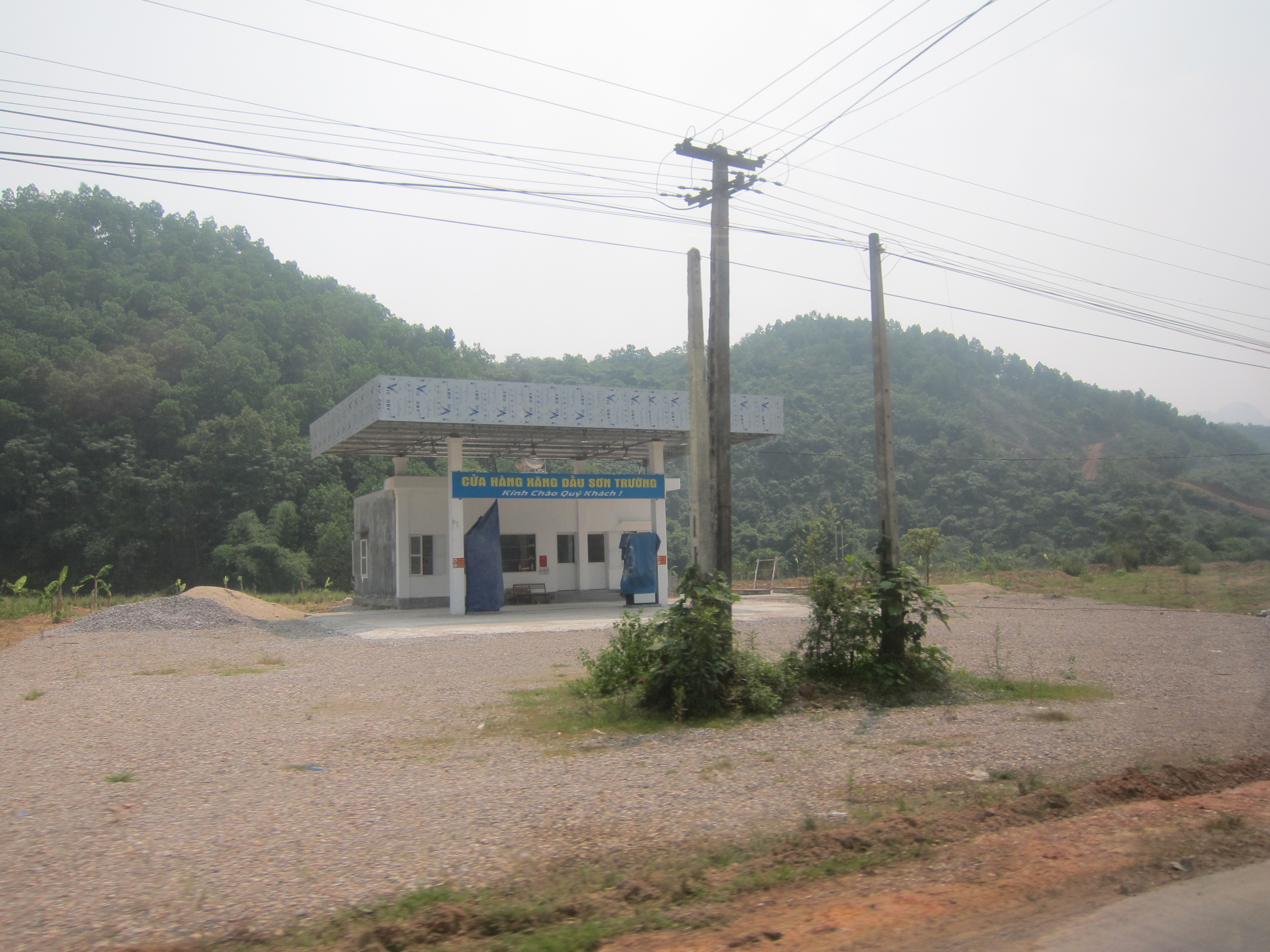
- Petrol station in Cao Sơn commune.

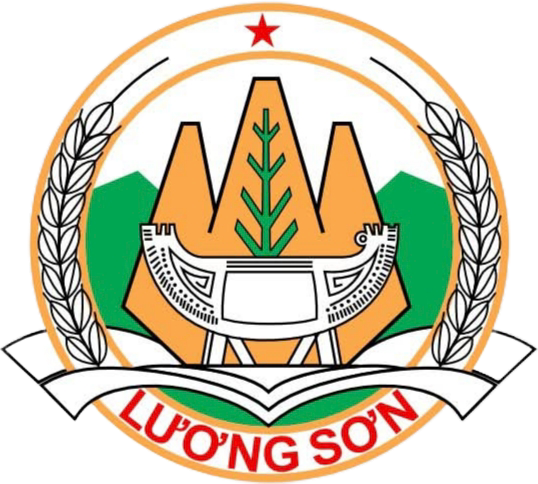
- Seal
- Nickname: "Perfumedland" (Miền thơm hương)
- Motto: "Glow a hometown" (Rực sáng một vùng quê)
- Interactive map of Lương Sơn district
- Coordinates: 20.867°N 105.500°E
- Country: Vietnam
- Region: Northwest
- Province: Hòa Bình
- Established: 1886
- Central hall: No.543, Trần Phú road, Lương Sơn township
- Subdivision: 1 township 10 communes

Government
  - Type: Rural district

Area
  - Total: 369.85 km^{2} (142.80 sq mi)

Population (2019)
  - Total: 99,457
  - Density: 268.91/km^{2} (696.48/sq mi)
- Time zone: UTC+7 (Indochina Time)
- ZIP code: 36250 (Note: An official code from 2020 to 2025.)
- Website: luongson.hoabinh.gov.vn

Lương Sơn is a former rural district of the former Hòa Bình province in the Northwest region of Vietnam, around 40 km from Hanoi.

== Geography ==
As of 2019, the district had a population of 99,457, with Muong people accounting for about 70% of the population. The district covers an area of 369.85 km^{2}. The district capital lies at Lương Sơn.

Lương Sơn is divided into 11 commune-level sub-divisions, including Lương Sơn township and 10 communes: Cao Dương, Cao Sơn, Cư Yên, Hòa Sơn, Lâm Sơn, Liên Sơn, Nhuận Trạch, Tân Vinh, Thanh Cao, Thanh Sơn.

== See also ==
- Cao Phong district
- Chương Mỹ district
- Đà Bắc district
- Lạc Thủy district
- Kim Bôi district
- Mai Châu district
- Mỹ Đức district
- Quốc Oai district
- Thạch Thất district
