= Nho Quan district =

Coordinates: 20.333°N 105.750°E

Nho Quan District Huyện Nho Quan
- District
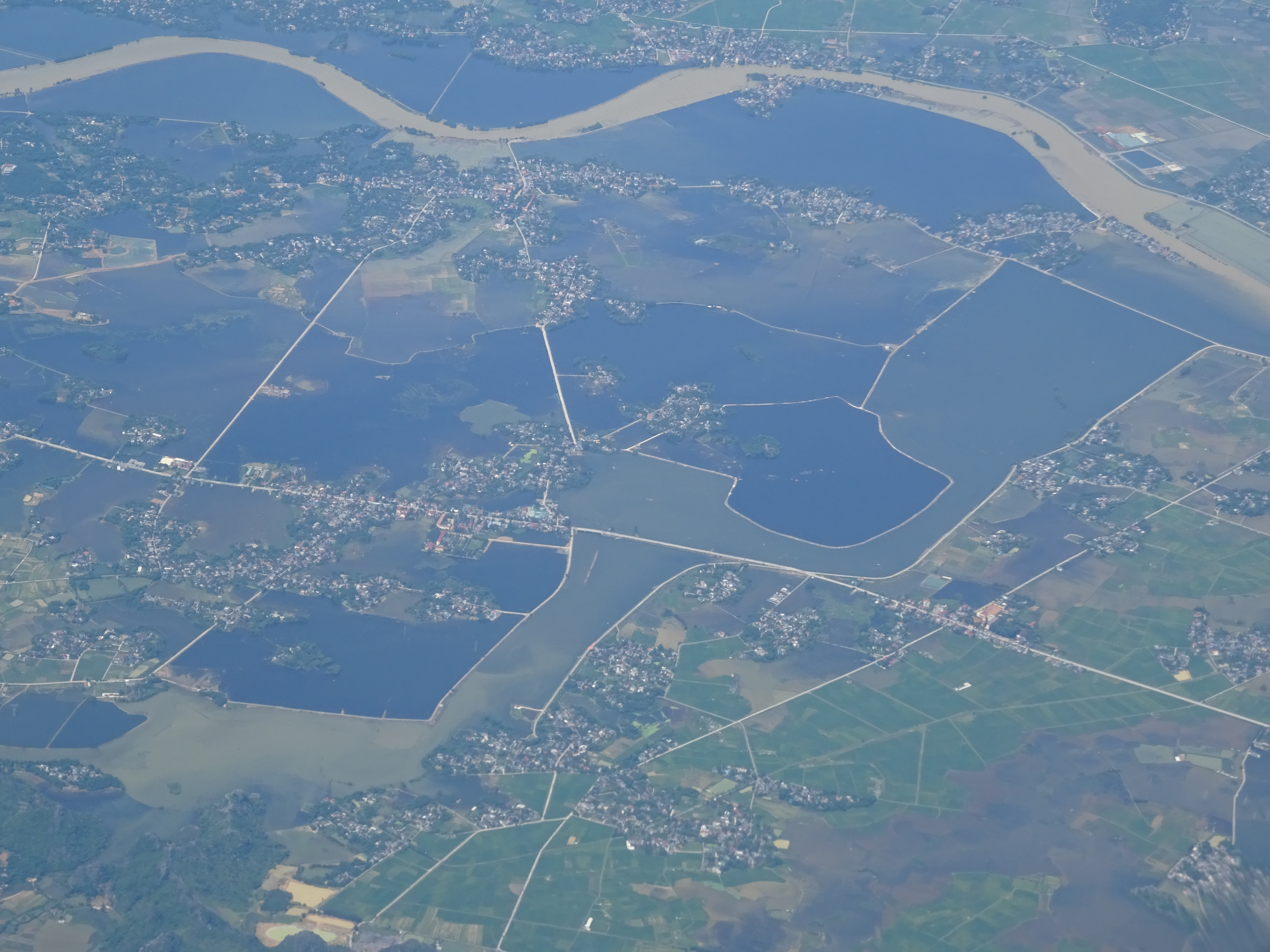
- Interactive map of Nho Quan District
- Country: Vietnam
- Region: Red River Delta
- Province: Ninh Bình
- Capital: Nho Quan

Area
  - Total: 175 sq mi (452 km^{2})

Population (2003)
  - Total: 145,186
- Time zone: UTC+07:00 (Indochina Time)

Nho Quan is a rural district of Ninh Bình province in the Red River Delta region of Vietnam. As of 2003, the district had a population of 145,186. The district covers an area of 452 km^{2}. The district capital lies at Nho Quan.

== Geography ==
Nho Quan district is located in the northwest of Ninh Bình province, 34 km northwest of Hoa Lư (city), and 127 km from the capital Hanoi. It has the following geographical position:

- To the east, it borders the cities of Hoa Lư, Tam Điệp, and Gia Viễn district.
- To the west and south, it borders Thạch Thành district, Thanh Hóa province.
- To the north, it borders Lạc Thủy district and Yên Thủy district, Hòa Bình province.

Nho Quan has the Bôi River connecting to the Hoàng Long River, which flows into the Đáy River. In addition, there are the Lạng River, Rịa River, and Bến Đang River. The district has 4 national highways running through it: National Route 12B, National Route 45, National Route 37C, National Route 38B, the Tràng An Boulevard, and the provincial roads 438, 477, 492.

Nho Quan is a district with the most natural and man-made lakes in Ninh Bình province. The major lakes include:

- Hồ Đập Trời is completely isolated from residential areas and has been developed into a farm with industrial crop hills, food crop areas, and livestock zones.
- Hồ Đồng Liều is located in Quỳnh Lưu commune, near Hồ Đá Lải.
- Hồ Đá Lải is in Phú Long commune, with a storage capacity of 2.5 million m³ of water. On an area of 400 m² of water surface, cage fish farming at Hồ Đá Lải produces 15–18 tons of meat fish each year.
- Hồ Đồng Chương is a lake situated amid pine hills and has been developed into a resort and relaxation tourism area.
- Hồ Thường Sung is located near the Cúc Phương Villa resort area.
- Hồ Yên Quang consists of 4 lakes separated by dams.
- Hồ Thác Lá is a long natural lake associated with the waterfall in Đầm Bông hamlet.
- Hồ Trổ Lưới is located in Vệ Đình hamlet, Thạch Bình commune.
- Hồ Đầm Đống is in Ngọc hamlet, Thạch Bình commune.

On the district's territory, there are two main religions: Buddhism and Catholicism, with 18% of the population following Catholicism.

== Administration ==
Nho Quan district has 23 administrative units at the commune level under its jurisdiction, including the township of Nho Quan (the district seat) and 22 communes: Cúc Phương, Đồng Phong, Đức Long, Gia Lâm, Gia Sơn, Gia Thủy, Gia Tường, Kỳ Phú, Lạc Vân, Phú Long, Phú Lộc, Phú Sơn, Phúc Sơn, Quảng Lạc, Quỳnh Lưu, Thạch Bình, Thanh Sơn, Thượng Hòa, Văn Phú, Văn Phương, Xích Thổ, Yên Quang.

== History ==
Nho Quan is an ancient district of Ninh Bình province, Vietnam. During the reign of Emperor Đinh Tiên Hoàng, it belonged to Trường Yên Prefecture.

During the Trần dynasty, it belonged to Thiên Quan Garrison. Thiên Quan consisted of three districts: Xích Thổ, Đông Lai, and Khôi.

In 1397, Hồ Quý Ly changed it into Thiên Quan Garrison. During the Lê dynasty, it was established as Thiên Quan Prefecture, which included three districts: Phụng Hóa, Yên Hóa, and Lạc Thổ.

In the 15th year of Emperor Tự Đức’s reign (1862), Thiên Quan Prefecture was renamed Nho Quan Prefecture. The name “Nho Quan” has been used since then.

In 1921, three tổng (sub-prefectures) — Đề Cốc, Mất Một, and Xích Thổ — belonging to Yên Hóa district were merged into Gia Viễn district.

After the August Revolution of 1945, adjustments were made by incorporating the tổng of Vân Trình (from Gia Viễn district) into Nho Quan district. The villages of Quảng Lạc commune belonged to Quỳnh Lưu tổng, Nho Quan Prefecture.

After the August Revolution, the villages and hamlets within the commune were merged to form Quảng Lạc commune, and after 1945, the prefecture level was abolished and the administrative unit was uniformly called a district. At that time, Nho Quan district consisted of 21 communes: Cúc Phương, Đồng Phong, Đức Long, Kỳ Phú, Lạc Vân, Lạng Phong, Phú Lộc, Phú Long, Phú Sơn, Quảng Lạc, Quỳnh Lưu, Sơn Hà, Sơn Lai, Sơn Thành, Thạch Bình, Thanh Lạc, Thượng Hòa, Văn Phong, Văn Phú, Văn Phương, and Yên Quang.

In 1946, Quảng Lạc was merged with Phú Long to form Lạc Thành commune. In April 1949, following the directive of the Provincial Party Committee on unifying grassroots leadership, the Nho Quan district Resistance Committee merged the 27 communes of the district into 10 large communes. Accordingly, Lạc Thành commune was merged into Quỳnh Lưu commune.

In early 1953, the Inter-zone 3 Administrative Resistance Committee merged five communes — Quang Minh, Phú Thịnh, Bảo Lương, Đoàn Kết, and Yên Lương — from Nho Quan into Yên Thủy district, Hòa Bình province, and established Nho Quan township by separating it from Lạng Phong commune. In 1954, Quỳnh Lưu commune was divided into five communes: Phú Long, Quỳnh Lưu, Sơn Lai, Quảng Lạc, and Sơn Hà.

On 27 December 1975, the National Assembly issued Resolution No. 4 on the merger of Ninh Bình province and Nam Hà province into Hà Nam Ninh province. Accordingly, Nho Quan district became part of Hà Nam Ninh province.

On 27 April 1977, the Government Council issued Decision No. 125-CP on the merger of Nho Quan district and Gia Viễn district into Hoàng Long district under Hà Nam Ninh province.

On 9 April 1981, the Government Council issued Decision No. 151-CP on the re-establishment of Gia Viễn district, separated from Hoàng Long district.

Hoàng Long district at that time included Nho Quan township (the district seat) and the following communes: Cúc Phương, Đồng Phong, Đức Long, Gia Lâm, Gia Sơn, Gia Thủy, Gia Tường, Kỳ Phú, Lạc Vân, Lạng Phong, Phú Long, Phú Lộc, Phú Sơn, Quảng Lạc, Quỳnh Lưu, Sơn Hà, Sơn Lai, Sơn Thành, Thạch Bình, Thanh Lạc, Thượng Hòa, Văn Phong, Văn Phú, Văn Phương, Yên Quang, and Xích Thổ.

On 26 December 1991, the National Assembly issued a resolution on the division of Hà Nam Ninh province into Nam Hà province and Ninh Bình province. Accordingly, Hoàng Long district became part of Ninh Bình province.

On 23 November 1993, the Government issued Decree No. 88-CP on renaming Hoàng Long district to Nho Quan district.

On 6 November 2008, the Government issued Decree No. 06/NĐ-CP on the adjustment of part of the area and population of Đồng Phong and Lạng Phong communes to be placed under the management of Nho Quan township.

Nho Quan district has a natural area of 45,833.07 hectares and a population of 147,936, with 27 administrative units under its jurisdiction.

On 10 December 2024, the Standing Committee of the National Assembly issued Resolution No. 1318/NQ-UBTVQH15 on the arrangement of district- and commune-level administrative units in Ninh Bình province for the period 2023–2025 (the resolution took effect from 1 January 2025). Accordingly:

- Phúc Sơn commune was established by merging Sơn Hà commune and Sơn Lai commune. - Thanh Sơn commune was established by merging Thanh Lạc commune and Sơn Thành commune. - Lạng Phong commune and Văn Phong commune were merged into Nho Quan township.

As a result, Nho Quan district has 1 township and 22 communes.

On 12 June 2025, the National Assembly issued Resolution No. 202/2025/QH15 on the arrangement of provincial-level administrative units (effective from 12 June 2025). Accordingly, Hà Nam province and Nam Định province were merged into Ninh Bình province.

On 16 June 2025, the National Assembly issued Resolution No. 203/2025/QH15 on amending and supplementing a number of articles of the Constitution of the Socialist Republic of Vietnam. Accordingly, the operation of district-level administrative units nationwide ended from 1 July 2025.

== Economy ==
=== Market System ===
In Vietnam, traditional markets (chợ) are open-air or semi-covered places where local vendors sell fresh food, household goods, clothing, and other daily necessities. These markets serve as important economic and social centers in rural and semi-urban areas.

Nho Quan has the following traditional markets, which are officially classified as Type 2 (Chợ loại 2): Medium-sized markets, usually with hundreds of regular stalls, better facilities, and higher trading volume, and Type 3 markets (Chợ loại 3): Smaller, more local markets with fewer stalls, often simpler setup in Ninh Bình province:

- Chợ Đế in Gia Tường commune
- Chợ Đồng Phong in Đồng Phong commune
- Chợ Lạc in Xích Thổ commune
- Chợ Lạm in Thanh Sơn commune
- Chợ Na in Gia Lâm commune
- Chợ Ngã Ba Anh Trỗi in Quỳnh Lưu commune
- Chợ Nho Quan in Nho Quan township
- Chợ Rịa in Phú Lộc commune
- Chợ Vĩnh Khương in Quảng Lạc commune

=== River Port System ===
According to Decision No. 2179/QĐ-UBND dated 17 September 2007 issued by the People's Committee of Ninh Bình province (approving the inland waterway transport plan for the province until 2015, with development orientations to 2020), Nho Quan has the following river ports and ferry landings:

- Cảng Nho Quan: located in Hamlet 4, Lạc Vân commune, Nho Quan district
- Cảng Núi Hốt: located in Lạc Vân commune, Nho Quan district

== Demographics ==
Nho Quan district has a total area of 450.53 km². In 2019, the population was 149,830 people with a population density of 333 people/km². The Kinh people make up nearly 90% of the population, while the Mường people account for over 10%. The Muong people in Nho Quan are divided into several subgroups:

- Mường Vang live mainly in Thạch Bình, Yên Quang, and Xích Thổ communes;
- Mường Rậm live mostly in Cúc Phương and partly in Văn Phương, preferring deep forest areas;
- Mường Bo live in Quảng Lạc;
- Mường Kỳ Lão live in Phú Long and Kỳ Phú communes.

In 2021, Nho Quan district had an area of 450.82 km² and a population of 153,430 people, with a population density of 340 people/km².[

As of 31 December 2024, the adjusted population of Nho Quan district was 178,833 people, with a total area of 450.82 km² and a population density of 396 people/km².

== Climate ==
Climate data for Nho Quan
Month	Jan	Feb	Mar	Apr	May	Jun	Jul	Aug	Sep	Oct	Nov	Dec	Year
Record high °C (°F)	33.6 (92.5)	35.7 (96.3)	38.4 (101.1)	41.1 (106.0)	42.0 (107.6)	40.8 (105.4)	41.3 (106.3)	39.3 (102.7)	37.4 (99.3)	35.1 (95.2)	34.5 (94.1)	31.6 (88.9)	42.0 (107.6)
Mean daily maximum °C (°F)	20.2 (68.4)	20.9 (69.6)	23.4 (74.1)	27.9 (82.2)	32.0 (89.6)	33.4 (92.1)	33.3 (91.9)	32.2 (90.0)	30.9 (87.6)	28.8 (83.8)	25.7 (78.3)	22.2 (72.0)	27.6 (81.7)
Daily mean °C (°F)	16.7 (62.1)	17.7 (63.9)	20.3 (68.5)	24.1 (75.4)	27.4 (81.3)	29.0 (84.2)	29.1 (84.4)	28.3 (82.9)	27.0 (80.6)	24.7 (76.5)	21.5 (70.7)	18.0 (64.4)	23.6 (74.5)
Mean daily minimum °C (°F)	14.2 (57.6)	15.6 (60.1)	18.2 (64.8)	21.6 (70.9)	24.3 (75.7)	25.9 (78.6)	26.0 (78.8)	25.5 (77.9)	24.2 (75.6)	21.8 (71.2)	18.5 (65.3)	15.0 (59.0)	20.9 (69.6)
Record low °C (°F)	2.9 (37.2)	1.0 (33.8)	7.1 (44.8)	12.4 (54.3)	16.9 (62.4)	19.2 (66.6)	20.8 (69.4)	21.7 (71.1)	16.7 (62.1)	12.6 (54.7)	8.0 (46.4)	2.4 (36.3)	1.0 (33.8)
Average precipitation mm (inches)	27.2 (1.07)	25.2 (0.99)	49.5 (1.95)	85.8 (3.38)	209.8 (8.26)	223.9 (8.81)	270.0 (10.63)	327.6 (12.90)	334.5 (13.17)	212.7 (8.37)	72.9 (2.87)	22.9 (0.90)	1,862.1 (73.31)
Average rainy days	10.1	12.3	15.8	13.9	15.1	15.6	15.8	18.1	14.8	11.7	7.8	6.1	157.1
Average relative humidity (%)	84.3	86.4	88.3	87.3	83.4	82.1	82.5	86.1	85.9	83.4	81.7	80.9	84.4
Mean monthly sunshine hours	71.0	50.8	48.6	93.1	173.8	168.8	180.1	158.2	161.5	153.0	131.6	113.9	1,501.2
Source: Vietnam Institute for Building Science and Technology
