= Vĩnh Tiến =

Vĩnh Tiến may refer to the following places in Vietnam:

- Vĩnh Tiến, Vĩnh Bảo District, Hải Phòng
- Vĩnh Tiến, Kim Bôi District, Hòa Bình
- Vĩnh Tiến, Tràng Định District, Lạng Sơn
- Vĩnh Tiến, Vĩnh Lộc District, Thanh Hóa
