= Gia Viễn district =

Rural district in Ninh Bình, Vietnam

Coordinates: 20.333°N 105.883°E

Gia Viễn district Huyện Gia Viễn
- Rural District
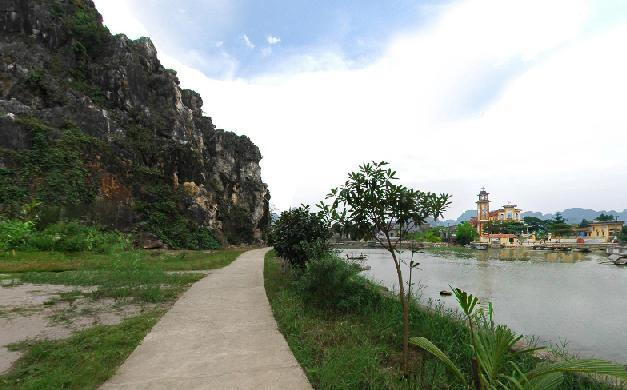
- Path leading to Kênh Gà – Vân Trình Resort.

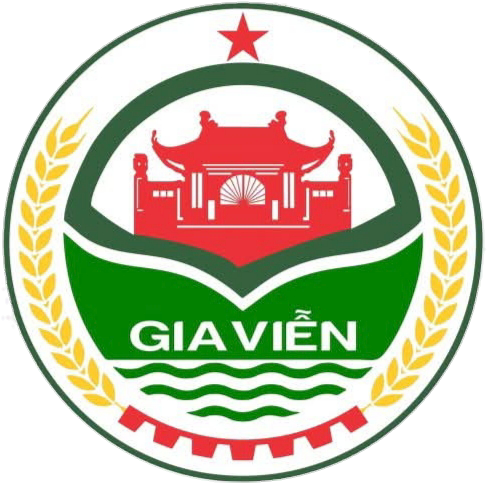
- Seal
- Nickname: "Land of Dream Spring" (Miền suối mơ)
- Motto(s): "Birthplace of Kings and Saints" (Sinh vương sinh thánh)
- Interactive map of Gia Viễn district
- Location of Gia Viễn in Vietnam.
- Country: Vietnam
- Province: Ninh Bình
- Establishment: 968
- Central hall: Me street, Thịnh Vượng township

Government
  - Type: Rural district
  - People Committee's Chairman: Phạm Văn Tam
  - People Council's chairman: Hoàng Mạnh Hùng
  - Front Committee's chairman: Mai Thị Kim Dung
  - Party Committee's Secretary: Hoàng Mạnh Hùng

Area
  - Total: 177.31 km^{2} (68.46 sq mi)

Population (September 29, 2023)
  - Total: 123,552
  - Density: 297/km^{2} (770/sq mi)
  - Ethnicities: Kinh; Tanka; Mường; Tày; Nùng
- Time zone: UTC+7 (Indochina Time)
- ZIP code: 432200 (Note: An official code from 2022.)
- Climate: Cwa
- Website: Giavien.Ninhbinh.gov.vn; Giavien.Ninhbinh.dcs.vn

Gia Viễn [zaː˧˧:viəʔən˧˥] is a former rural district of Ninh Bình province in the Red River Delta region of Vietnam.

== History ==
=== Middle Ages ===
In the last years of the Tang dynasty (866), the wharf of Hoàng Long River was one of the places where the raids of the Cao Biền cavalry took place to deport the Mashynzy forces from An Nam protectorate, thereby restoring the temporary peace after many years of riot. Cao Biền set up an administrative unit called Đại Hoàng canton (Đại Hoàng châu). (Note: By An Nam chí lược and An Nam chí nguyên.)

According to the affirmation of Đại Việt sử ký toàn thư, Emperor Đinh Hoàn allowed to establish in the Northwest of capital Tràng An an administrative unit called Nhu Viễn rural district (Nhu Viễn huyện), belonged to Đại Hoàng canton, where has a position as an outpost (đất phên giậu) to protect the imperial citadel from attacks of the Tai tribes.

When Emperor Lý Thái Tổ gave up Hoa Lư to set up new capital Thăng Long in 1009, Như Viễn was changed as An Viễn rural district (An Viễn huyện).

The Ming dynasty after acquiring An Nam has changed An Viễn as Tuy Viễn rural district (Tuy Viễn huyện) in 1408.

In the early stages of the Later Lê dynasty, Emperor Lê Thái Tông changed Tuy Viễn as Gia Viễn rural district (Gia Viễn huyện) of Trường Yên prefecture (Trường Yên phủ), initially belonged to Thanh Hoa garrison (Thanh Hoa trấn), then transferred to Sơn Nam province (Sơn Nam thừa tuyên).

Since the 12nd of Minh Mệnh (1831), Gia Viễn rural district has belonged to Ninh Bình province (Ninh Bình tỉnh).

=== 20th century ===
Under the State of Vietnam regime, Gia Viễn rural district was changed as Gia Viễn district (quận Gia Viễn), belonged to Ninh Bình province of the Central canton (Trung châu) in the Northern Việt region (Bắc Việt).

On April 27, 1977, Gia Viễn was merged with Nho Quan to become Hoàng Long rural district (huyện Hoàng Long), belonged to Hà Nam Ninh province. (Note: What has come from the merging of the three provinces Hà Nam, Nam Định and Ninh Bình.)

However, by April 9, 1981, Gia Viễn rural district (huyện Gia Viễn) was re-established. Gia Vượng commune became the officially capital of Gia Viễn.

On April 1, 1986, Me township (thị trấn Me) was established based on the area of the two communes Gia Thịnh and Gia Vượng. (Note: Nghị định số 06/NĐ-CP của Chính Phủ về việc điều chỉnh địa giới hành chính xã để mở rộng thị trấn thuộc huyện Nho Quan và huyện Gia Viễn, tỉnh Ninh Bình.) Because of that, it has another name as Thịnh Vượng township (means "the prosperous municipality") by the local folk.

=== 21st century ===
On December 10, 2024, the Standing Committee of the National Assembly issued Resolution 1318/NQ-UBTVQH152008 (Note: Nghị quyết số 1318/NQ-UBTVQH15 về việc sắp xếp đơn vị hành chính cấp huyện và cấp xã của tỉnh Ninh Bình giai đoạn 2023 – 2025.) on arranging district and commune-level administrative units of Ninh Bình province in the period of 2023–25, which is effective force from January 1, 2025. Accordingly :

- Me township was changed officially as Thịnh Vượng township (thị trấn Thịnh Vượng).
- Two communes Gia Tiến and Gia Thắng were merged each other to become Tiến Thắng commune.

== Geography ==
=== Topography ===
Currently, Gia Viễn rural district includes 21 commune-level administrative units.

- 1 municipality : Thịnh Vượng capital-township.
- 17 communes : Gia Hòa, Gia Hưng, Gia Lạc, Gia Lập, Gia Minh, Gia Phong, Gia Phú, Gia Phương, Gia Sinh, Gia Tân, Gia Thanh, Gia Trấn, Gia Trung, Gia Vân, Gia Xuân, Liên Sơn, Tiến Thắng.

The rural district covers an area of 177.31 km^{2}, with its terrain tends to be low from North to South. About 1/4 of its area is mountain, which is concentrated in the North and a little West.

Most of the remaining areas are mainly located around Cút swamp and Hoàng Long River, where are even lower than sea level, so they are always heavily flooded every time in the rainy season.

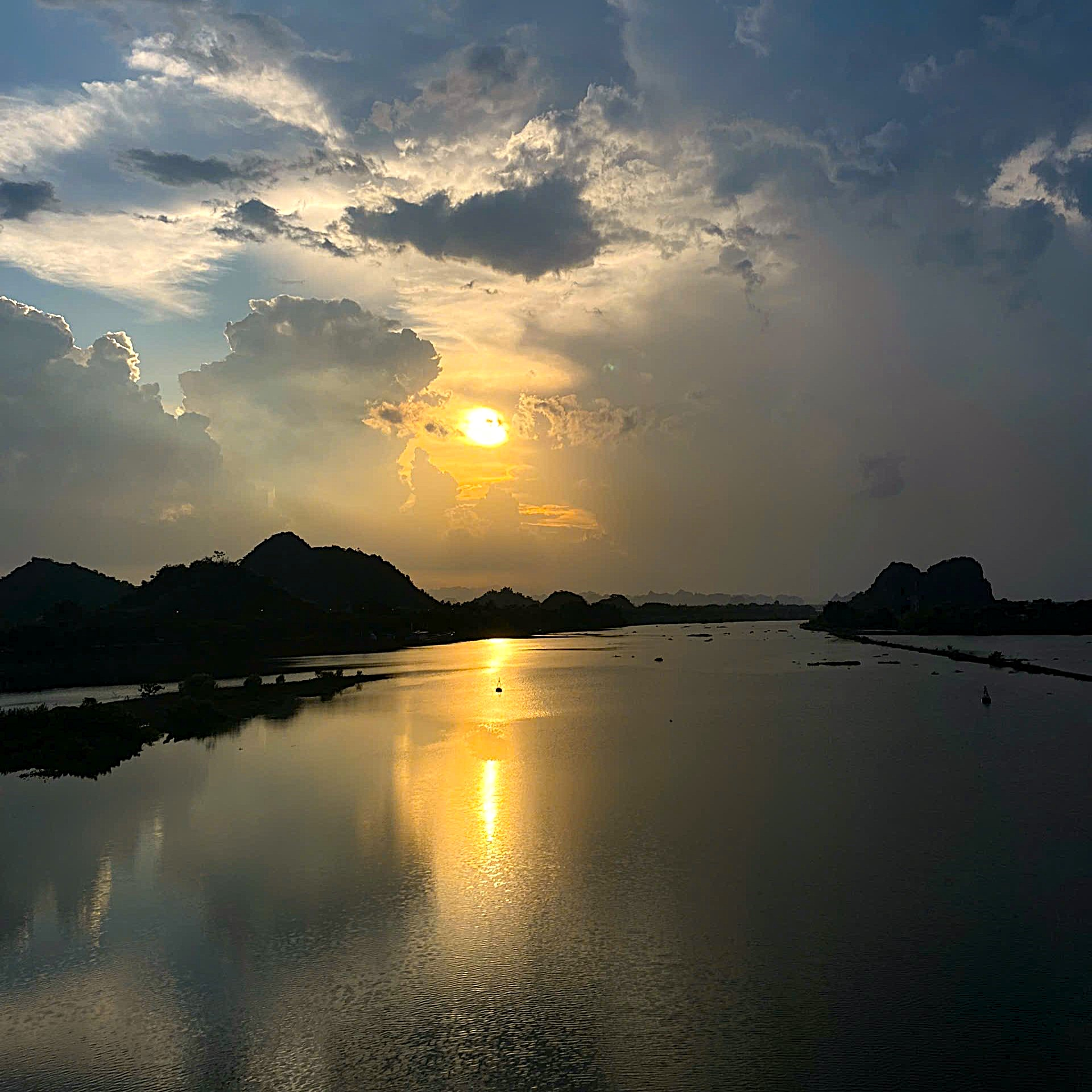
Sunset on Hoàng Long river, 2024.

Throughout its historical length, Hoàng Long river has a very important position in spirituality, customs and especially the trade of Gia Viễn rural district. The river only wanders around 25 km within the rural district before integrating into Đáy River. Its name means "the yellow dragon", which refers to its shape and color of its water. This is also the only source of alluvium, which fosters the fertility of the territory. However, this is also the biggest challenge for the survival of the communities that settled in the rural district, when the amount of water is always exceeding the threshold of endurance in the transition period from winter to spring and autumn to winter.

=== Population ===
According to the statistics of the Ninh Bình Provincial People's Committee in 2023, Gia Viễn rural district's population reached 123,512.

In the composition of the population, there are always three main groups : Kinh, Tanka and Mường. Mường people have occupied most of the population, before being replaced by Kinh and Tanka. Currently, the Kinh group has won the majority position, while all other groups are only very low.

After the North frontier conflict temporarily settled down in 1984, the rural district's population structure had significantly fluctuated. Tanka people who have previously settled in traditional markets with a large number seeks to migrate from the Northern Vietnam for each household, which receives implicit encouragement from local authorities. The families who remained, gradually registered themselves as Kinh people to avoid all the harm from the authorities. Besides, there was a significant number of groups Tày and Nùng who have been refugees from Cao Bằng, Lạng Sơn and Quảng Ninh, where was very dangerous by the mutual ambush between the two countries.

The territory of Gia Viễn rural district is part of the Đồng Chưa Deanery (giáo hạt Đồng Chưa), belonged the Phát Diệm Diocese (giáo phận Phát Diệm). (Note: Vincent Trần Ngọc Thụ, Lịch sử giáo phận Phát Diệm (History of the Phát Diệm Diocese), Publishing by the Phát Diệm Communication Committee and Đắc Lộ Tùng Thư, Paris, 2001.)

- Anthony Parish at Phong Tĩnh village, Gia Phong commune, Gia Viễn rural district.
- Đồng Chưa Parish, Thịnh Vượng township, Gia Viễn rural district.
- Lãng Vân Parish, Gia Lập commune, Gia Viễn rural district.
- Liên Phương Parish, Gia Thủy commune, Nho Quan rural district.
- Mưỡu Giáp Parish, Gia Xuân commune, Gia Viễn rural district.
- Mỹ Thủy Parish, Thịnh Vượng township, Gia Viễn rural district.
- Phúc Lai Parish, Phúc Sơn commune, Nho Quan rural district.
- Trung Đồng Parish, Gia Trung commune, Gia Viễn rural district.
- Uy Đức Parish, Gia Hòa commune, Gia Viễn rural district.
- Uy Tế Parish, Gia Hưng commune, Gia Viễn rural district.

== Culture ==
The beliefs and customs in Gia Viễn rural district are generally diverse by the contribution of many different ethnic groups. Therefore, researchers often evaluate the main features of traditional practices in this rural district based on religion.

Before Christianity began to penetrate by sea, the area of Gia Viễn as well as most of the situation of the Southern region of the Central canton, where the competition and even the mutual influence of the religions Buddhism and Taoism. That phenomenon has left a large amount of the pagoda and temple. According to each historical period, even these architectural works are constantly changing the function to meet the spiritual needs of a believers.

For example, like Hoa Lư, Gia Viễn belongs to the very small number of Vietnamese localities that still maintain the custom of worshiping the Jade Emperor, because many temples have been renovated into pagodas in the mid 20th century.

=== Tourism ===
Contrary to the harsh situation of nature, Gia Viễn has a surprisingly rich in historical sites, cultural heritage of model construction. In their research articles, Professor Liam C. Kelley called this land as a place with "the curvature of history" (Note: Độ cong của lịch sử.), while Doctor Trần Trọng Dương called "the capacitor of history" (Note: Độ tụ của lịch sử.).

- Gia Hưng commune : Hoa Lư cave complex (động Hoa Lư) is known as the beginning of all efforts to unify the country of Emperor Đinh Hoàn.
- Gia Thanh commune : Địch Lộng cave (động Địch Lộng) was formerly the shelter of the taoists, until 1740, it became a pagoda to worship Buddha. Later, Emperor Minh Mệnh gave it the title of "the most beautiful cave in An Nam" (Nam thiên đệ nhất động). Besides, Kẽm Trống cave (Note: "Địch Lộng" and "Kẽm Trống" are the Hanese ways to write word "t'lung" in Annamese language, which means "valley".) (hang Kẽm Trống) is considered a special relic because of the complexity of many elements of spiritual, cultural and historical. It was in this place in 1694 that at least 318 sets of remains were discovered, which was caused by the people of Đa Giá Thượng robbery village for thirty years of the 17th century. After this cave was renovated into a pagoda, according to the local legend, female poet Hồ Xuân Hương came here in the early 19th century and celebrated it with a Nôm poem.
- Gia Sinh commune : Bái Đính pagoda (chùa Bái Đính) was originally a Buddhist work built in 1136 as a spiritual comforting place of local nobility, until 2003, it was planned into a Buddhist architectural complex with the largest scale in Southeast Asia.
- Kênh Gà – Vân Trình Resort (khu du lịch Kênh Gà – Vân Trình) is a combination of tourism and resort located in Thịnh Vượng township. It includes Kênh Gà hot spring and Vân Trình cave. However, because its location is part of the flood discharge area in the Red River Delta, all traffic and tourism activities are banned from July to September, when the Northern Vietnam usually has storms.

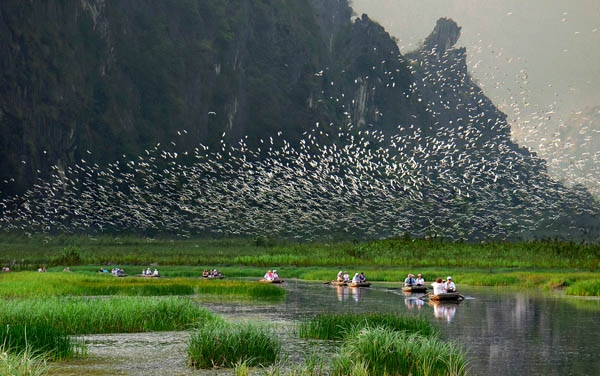
Storks were flying on Vân Long lagoon, 2011.

- Vân Long Nature Reserve (khu bảo tồn thiên nhiên Vân Long) is actually just the whole scope of Vân Long lagoon. It has been recognized by the Government of Vietnam as the largest biosphere reserve in the Northern since 1998. The territory is said to be the place where Emperor Đinh Hoàn was born and raised, then gathered forces to rebel. Currently, his village position has developed into a model urban area of Ninh Bình.

=== Cuisine ===
With its terrain always suffering from muddy situation, Gia Viễn rural district has the characteristics of many dishes from brackish water.

- Caridina sauce (mắm tép) : The spice is both salty and sour, even less rotten than shrimp sauce. It is often served with boiled vegetables in summer. Since the 2000s, it has been widely recognized as a specialty or trade brand of Ninh Bình province by press.
- Fried banana fish (cá chuối nướng) : A specialty come from Vân Long lagoon. Previously, it once received the title as "the royal fish" (cá tiến vua), because always belonged to the tribute for courts.

Starting in the decade of 2010, the rural district has developed two new specialties : Yellow sweetpotatoes from Hoàng Long river wharf and mountain goats from the area of Kênh Gà – Vân Long.

== Economy ==
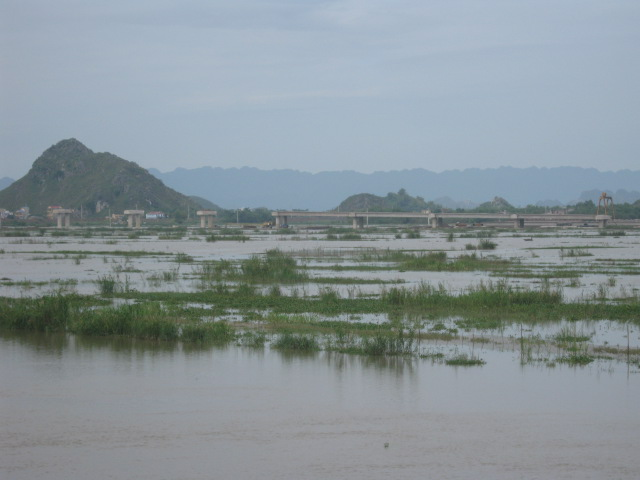
Trường Yên bridge on Hoàng Long river, what connected Gia Viễn to Hoa Lư, 2011.

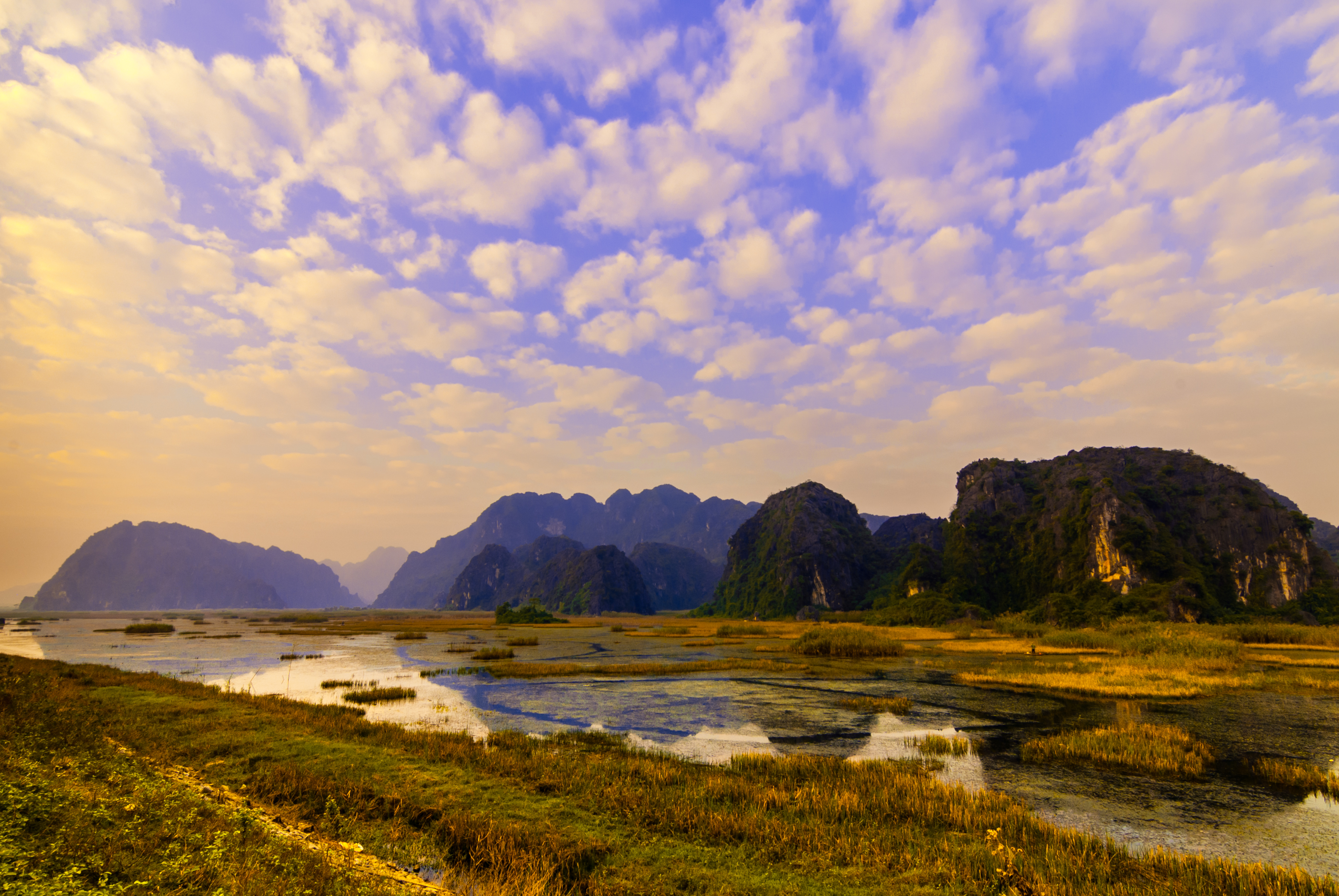
A corner of Vân Long lagoon, 2011.

Although the river system is not interlaced and there is no sea, Gia Viễn rural district is connected to the Đáy River through Hoàng Long river, so shipbuilding is a relatively long-standing profession of the rural district.

In the area of Gia Viễn rural district, there is also a profession of manufacturing products from bamboo, especially nón tơi. Immediately after the COVID-19 pandemic, due to the influence of the trend of Vietnamese classical costumes on social networks, artisans from Thịnh Vượng township (former Gia Vượng commune) have researched to restore horse hats (馬笠, nón mê). It is originally a form of the nón tơi, but its rim is wider and harder, and its tip is always covered with iron. This type of hat belonged to the cavalry, then became popular for officials and nobles by its optimization.

Another feature to identify Gia Viễn is the market, which is central to the livelihood of the people and culture. Although the infrastructure of the district's market system is underdeveloped, it is practical and convenient. So far, the District People's Committee is still seeking to preserve them by the significant contribution to the national treasury and the continuous improvement of the living standards of the people.

Currently, to keep up with the policy of the Government of Vietnam on the conversion of the nature of the economy (chính-sách chuyển-đổi cơ-cấu kinh-tế), the leadership of Ninh Bình province has tried to give suggestions and financial advocacy to help Gia Viễn rural district can build three industrial parks with average scale.

- Gián Khẩu Industrial Zone (khu công-nghiệp Gián-khẩu) in the area of communes Gia Trấn and Gia Xuân : Provision of tourism services and high-class materials.
- Gia Sinh Industrial Cluster (cụm công-nghiệp Gia-sinh) at the foot of Đính mountain in Gia Sinh commune : Supply of materials for construction and chemical fertilizer.
- Gia Vân Industrial Cluster (cụm công-nghiệp Gia-vân) along Vân Long lagoon in Gia Vân commune : Supply of bamboo products and tourism services.

== See also ==
- Hoa Lư city
- Lạc Thủy district
- Nho Quan district
- Thanh Liêm district
- Ý Yên district
