= Yên Thủy district =

Coordinates: 20.417°N 105.700°E

Yên Thủy District Huyện Yên Thủy
- District
- Interactive map of Yên Thủy District
- Country: Vietnam
- Region: Northwest
- Province: Hòa Bình
- Capital: Hàng Trạm

Area
  - Total: 109 sq mi (282 km^{2})

Population (2003)
  - Total: 62,050
- Time zone: UTC+7 (Indochina Time)

Yên Thủy is a former rural district of Hòa Bình province in the Northwest region of Vietnam. As of 2003, the district had a population of 62,050. The district covers an area of 282 km^{2}. The district capital is Hàng Trạm.
