= Đà Bắc district =

Đà Bắc District Huyện Đà Bắc
- District
- Interactive map of Đà Bắc District
- Country: Vietnam
- Region: Northwest
- Province: Hòa Bình
- Time zone: UTC+7 (Indochina Time)

Đà Bắc is a former rural district of Hòa Bình province in the Northwest region of Vietnam.
