= Kim Bôi district =

Kim Bôi District Huyện Kim Bôi
- District
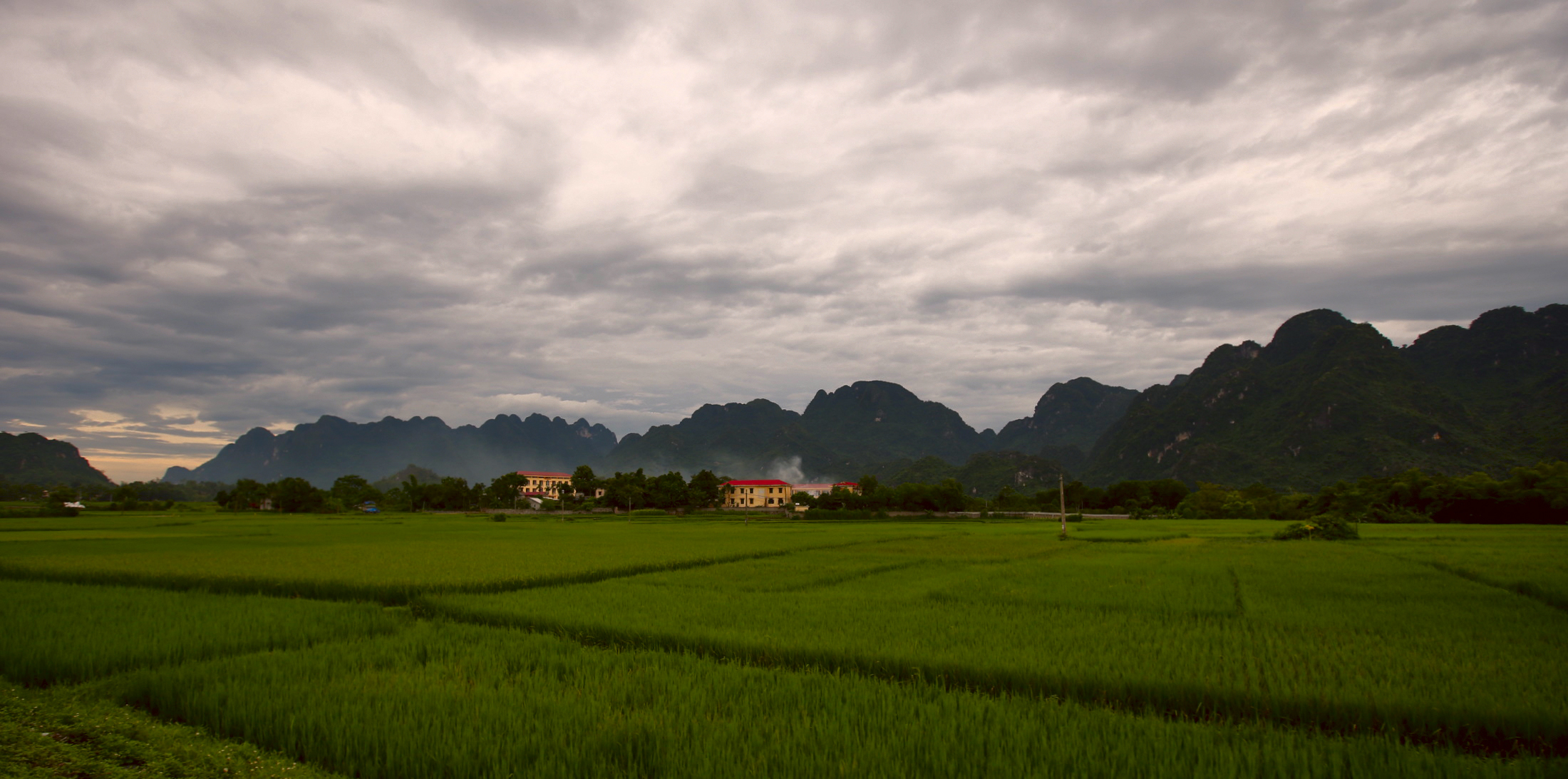
- Interactive map of Kim Bôi District
- Coordinates: 20.667°N 105.583°E
- Country: Vietnam
- Region: Northwest
- Province: Hòa Bình
- Capital: Bo
- Subdivision: 1 township and 16 rural communes

Government
  - Type: District

Area
  - Total: 551.03 km^{2} (212.75 sq mi)

Population (2019)
  - Total: 118,767
  - Density: 215.54/km^{2} (558.24/sq mi)
- Time zone: UTC+7 (Indochina Time)

Kim Bôi is a former rural district of Phú Thọ province in the Northwest region of Vietnam. As of 2019, the district had a population of 118,767. The district covered an area of 551.03 km^{2}. The district capital lay at Bo. It was famous for such sites as Kim Boi Hot Springs and Serena Resorts.

== Geography ==
Kim Bôi was divided into 17 commune-level sub-divisions, including the township of Bo and 16 rural communes (Bình Sơn, Cuối Hạ, Đông Bắc, Đú Sáng, Hợp Tiến, Hùng Sơn, Kim Bôi, Kim Lập, Mỵ Hòa, Nam Thượng, Nuông Dăm, Sào Báy, Tú Sơn, Vĩnh Đồng, Vĩnh Tiến, Xuân Thủy).

== Climate ==
Climate data for Kim Bôi
Month	Jan	Feb	Mar	Apr	May	Jun	Jul	Aug	Sep	Oct	Nov	Dec	Year
Record high °C (°F)	34.5 (94.1)	37.2 (99.0)	41.4 (106.5)	39.8 (103.6)	41.6 (106.9)	40.9 (105.6)	40.8 (105.4)	39.4 (102.9)	38.0 (100.4)	36.0 (96.8)	37.4 (99.3)	33.7 (92.7)	41.6 (106.9)
Mean daily maximum °C (°F)	20.3 (68.5)	21.3 (70.3)	24.1 (75.4)	28.5 (83.3)	32.2 (90.0)	33.3 (91.9)	33.3 (91.9)	32.5 (90.5)	31.3 (88.3)	29.0 (84.2)	25.8 (78.4)	22.4 (72.3)	27.8 (82.0)
Daily mean °C (°F)	16.3 (61.3)	17.6 (63.7)	20.3 (68.5)	24.1 (75.4)	26.9 (80.4)	28.3 (82.9)	28.3 (82.9)	27.6 (81.7)	26.4 (79.5)	24.0 (75.2)	20.7 (69.3)	17.5 (63.5)	23.2 (73.8)
Mean daily minimum °C (°F)	13.7 (56.7)	15.3 (59.5)	18.0 (64.4)	21.3 (70.3)	23.6 (74.5)	25.0 (77.0)	25.1 (77.2)	24.7 (76.5)	23.4 (74.1)	20.9 (69.6)	17.5 (63.5)	14.3 (57.7)	20.2 (68.4)
Record low °C (°F)	2.6 (36.7)	4.5 (40.1)	6.7 (44.1)	12.0 (53.6)	15.8 (60.4)	17.3 (63.1)	19.2 (66.6)	20.3 (68.5)	15.9 (60.6)	10.7 (51.3)	7.0 (44.6)	1.4 (34.5)	1.4 (34.5)
Average rainfall mm (inches)	33.5 (1.32)	30.8 (1.21)	55.3 (2.18)	103.6 (4.08)	272.6 (10.73)	304.4 (11.98)	339.8 (13.38)	348.8 (13.73)	346.0 (13.62)	224.7 (8.85)	75.2 (2.96)	25.1 (0.99)	2,159.7 (85.03)
Average rainy days	11.5	13.0	16.2	15.9	17.6	18.1	19.2	18.9	15.2	11.9	8.4	7.2	173.3
Average relative humidity (%)	84.2	85.1	85.9	85.2	83.5	84.0	84.4	86.6	86.1	84.3	82.7	81.6	84.5
Mean monthly sunshine hours	64.5	51.0	55.3	93.3	164.2	155.2	170.0	158.3	153.2	137.7	123.6	106.2	1,434.5
Source: Vietnam Institute for Building Science and Technology
