= Kim Bôi =

Town in Hòa Bình, Vietnam

- Commune
- Location within Vietnam
- Coordinates: 20°40′25″N 105°31′52″E
- Country: Vietnam
- Region: Northwest
- Province: Phú Thọ

Area
  - Total: 5.12 sq mi (13.27 km^{2})

Population (2019)
  - Total: 14,401
  - Density: 2,810/sq mi (1,085/km^{2})
- Time zone: UTC+7 (UTC + 7)

Kim Bôi is a commune of Phú Thọ Province, in the northwestern region of Vietnam.

On June 16, 2025, the Standing Committee of the National Assembly issued Resolution No. 1660/NQ-UBTVQH15 on the reorganization of commune-level administrative units in Phú Thọ Province in 2025 (the resolution took effect on the date of its adoption). Accordingly, the entire natural area and population of Bo Township, Vĩnh Đồng Commune, and Kim Bôi Commune were consolidated to establish a new commune named Kim Bôi Commune.
