= Hòa Bình province =

Province of Vietnam

Hòa Bình Hoà Bình
- Province
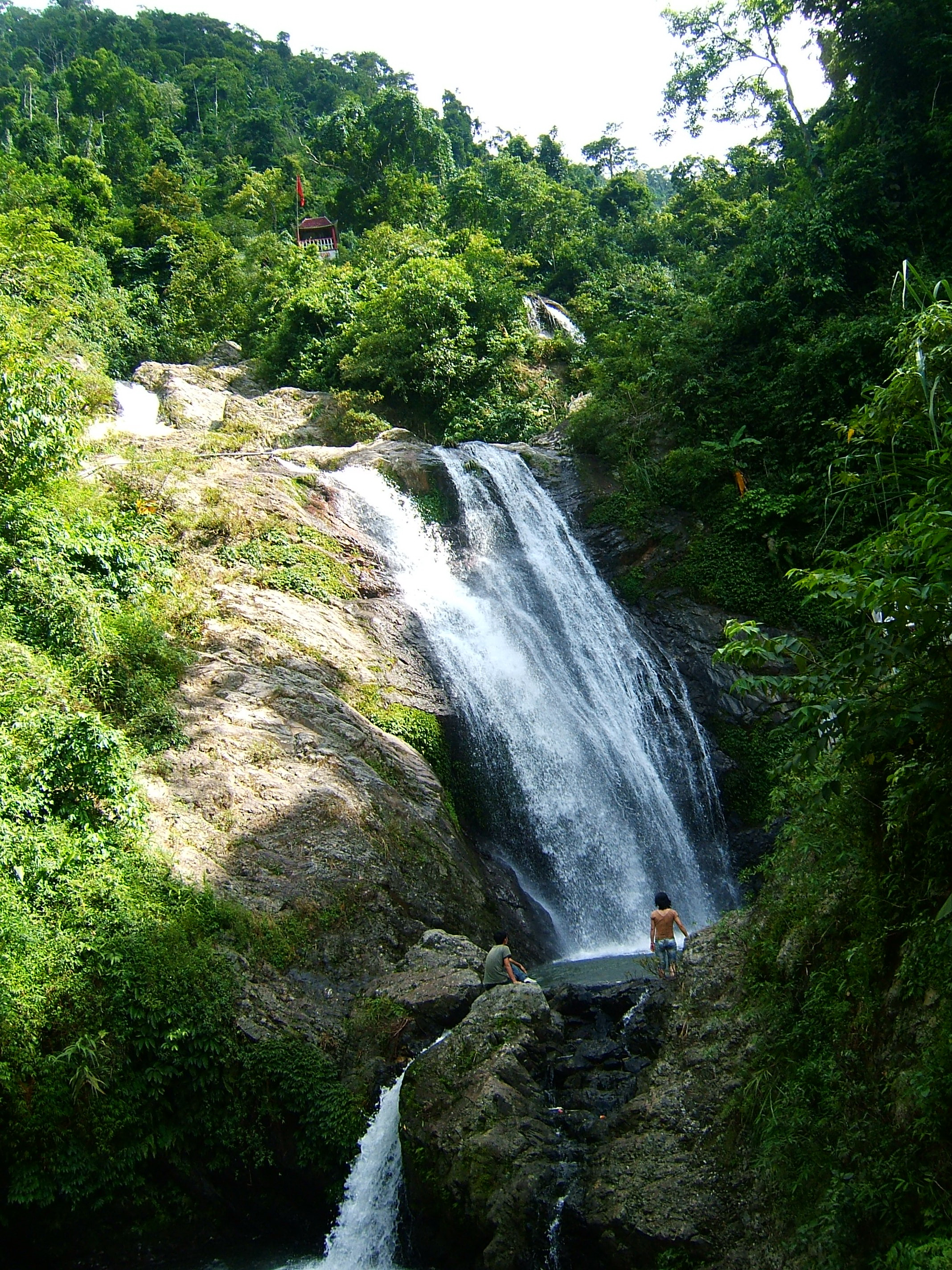
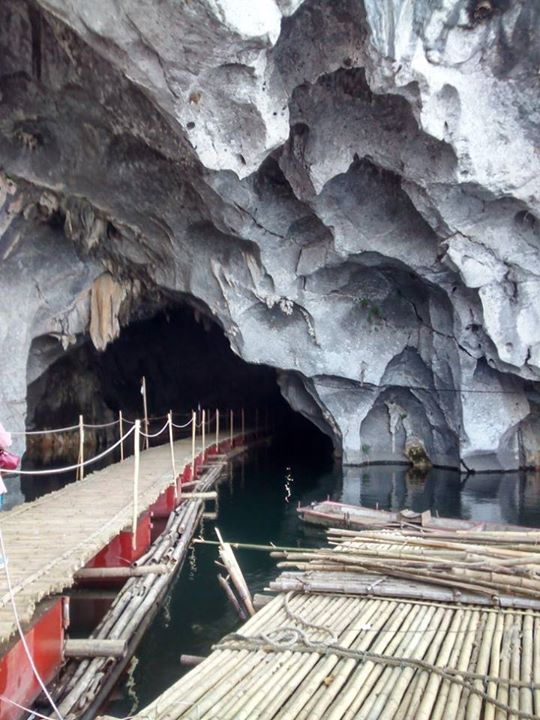
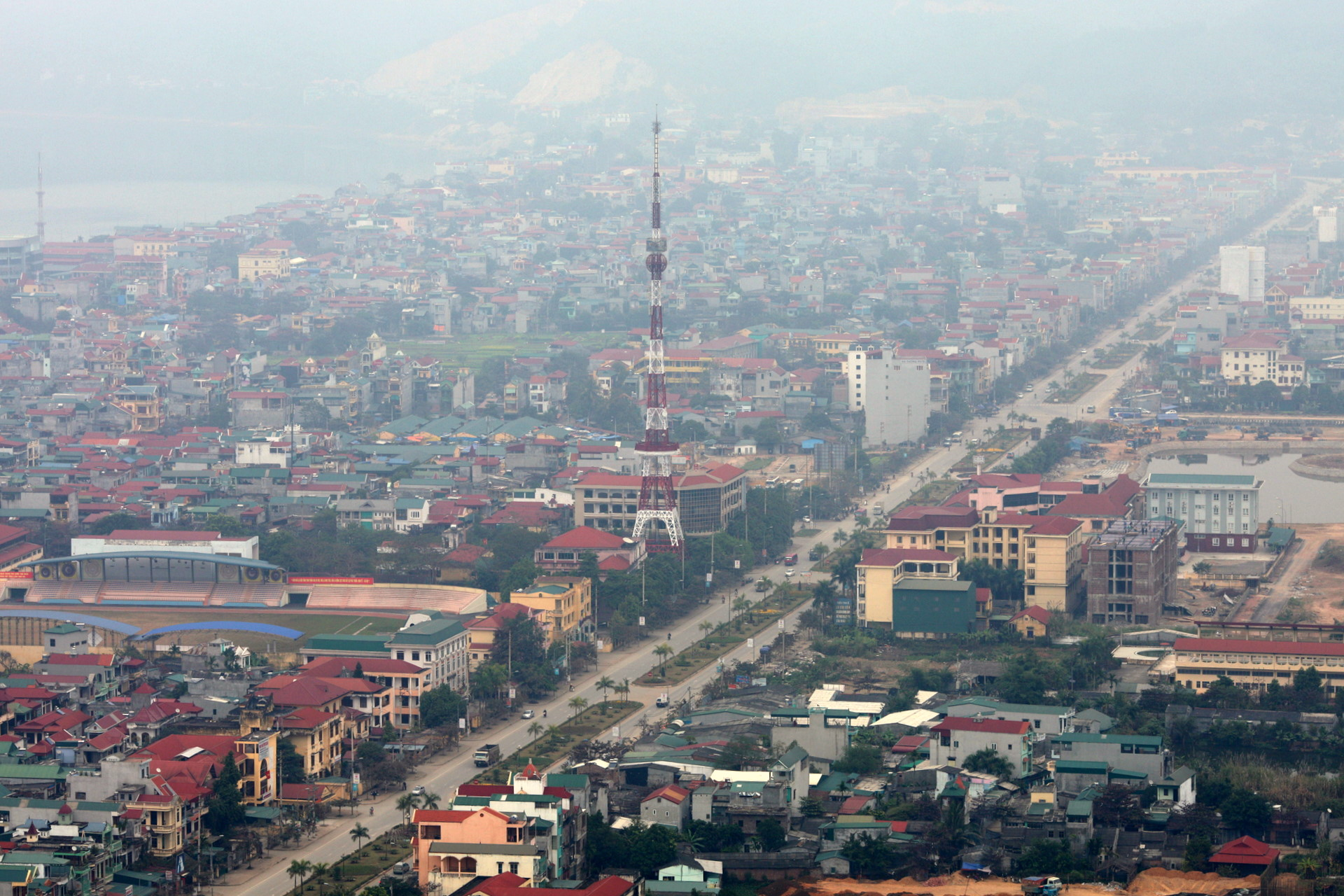
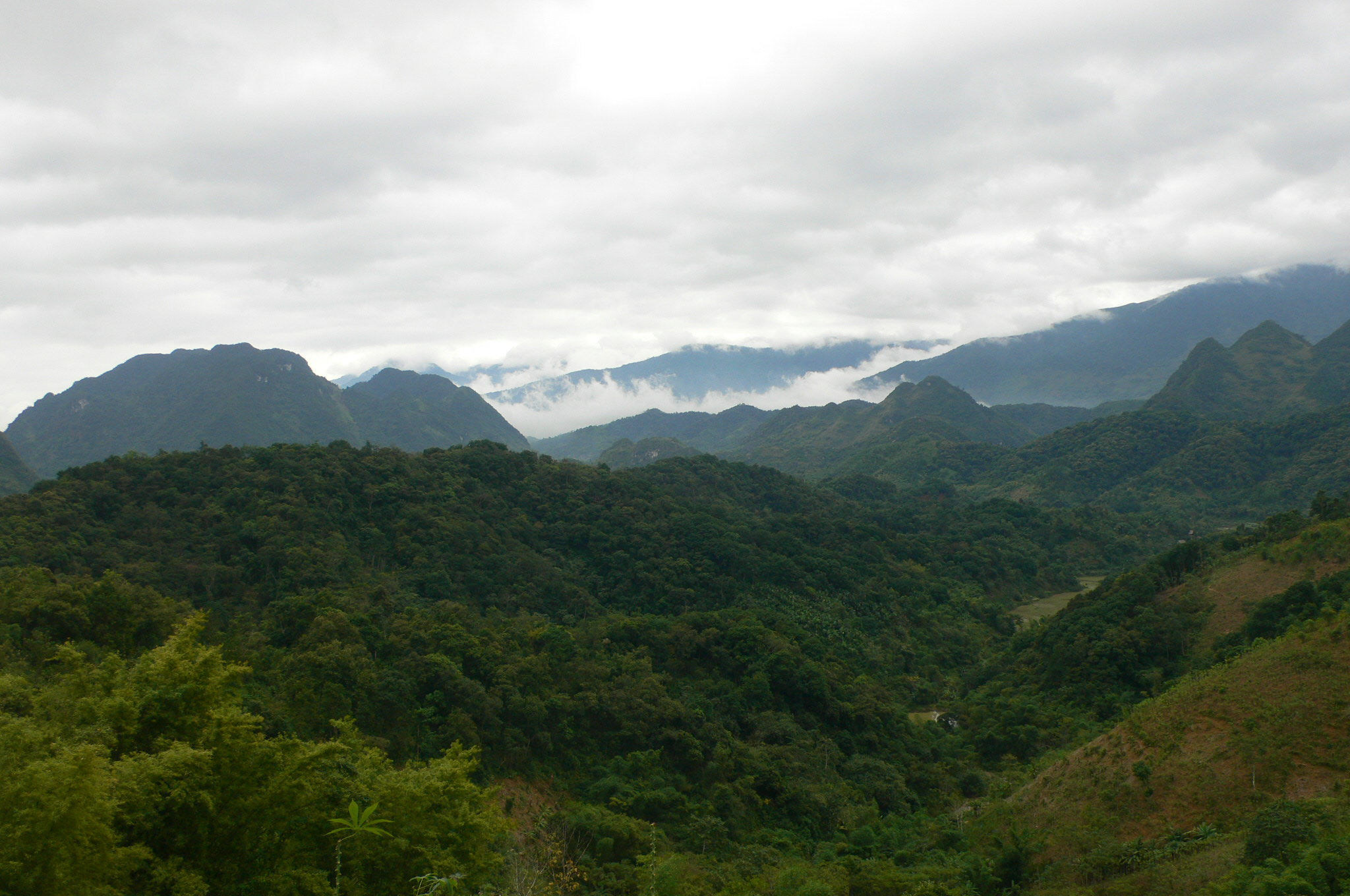
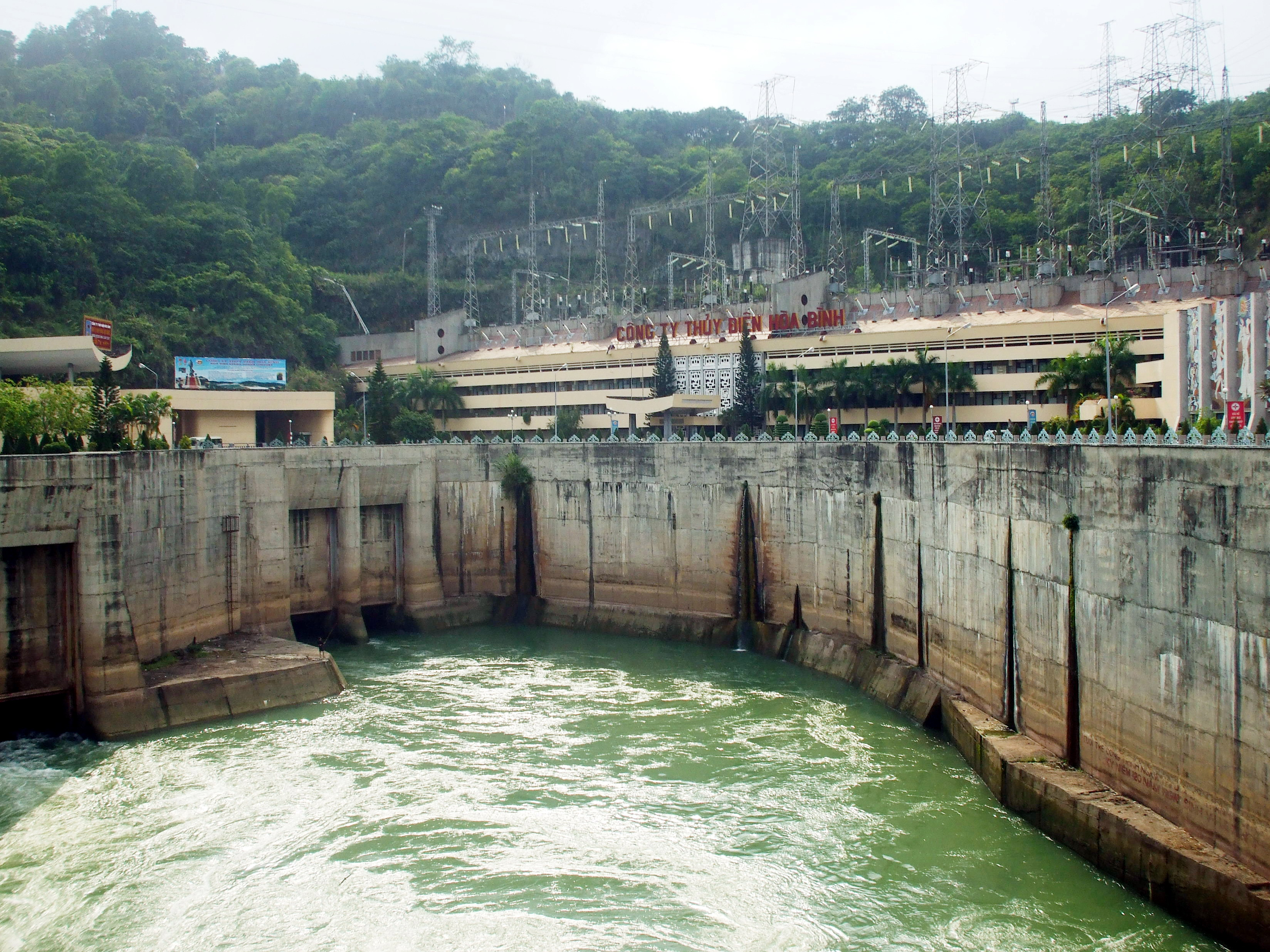
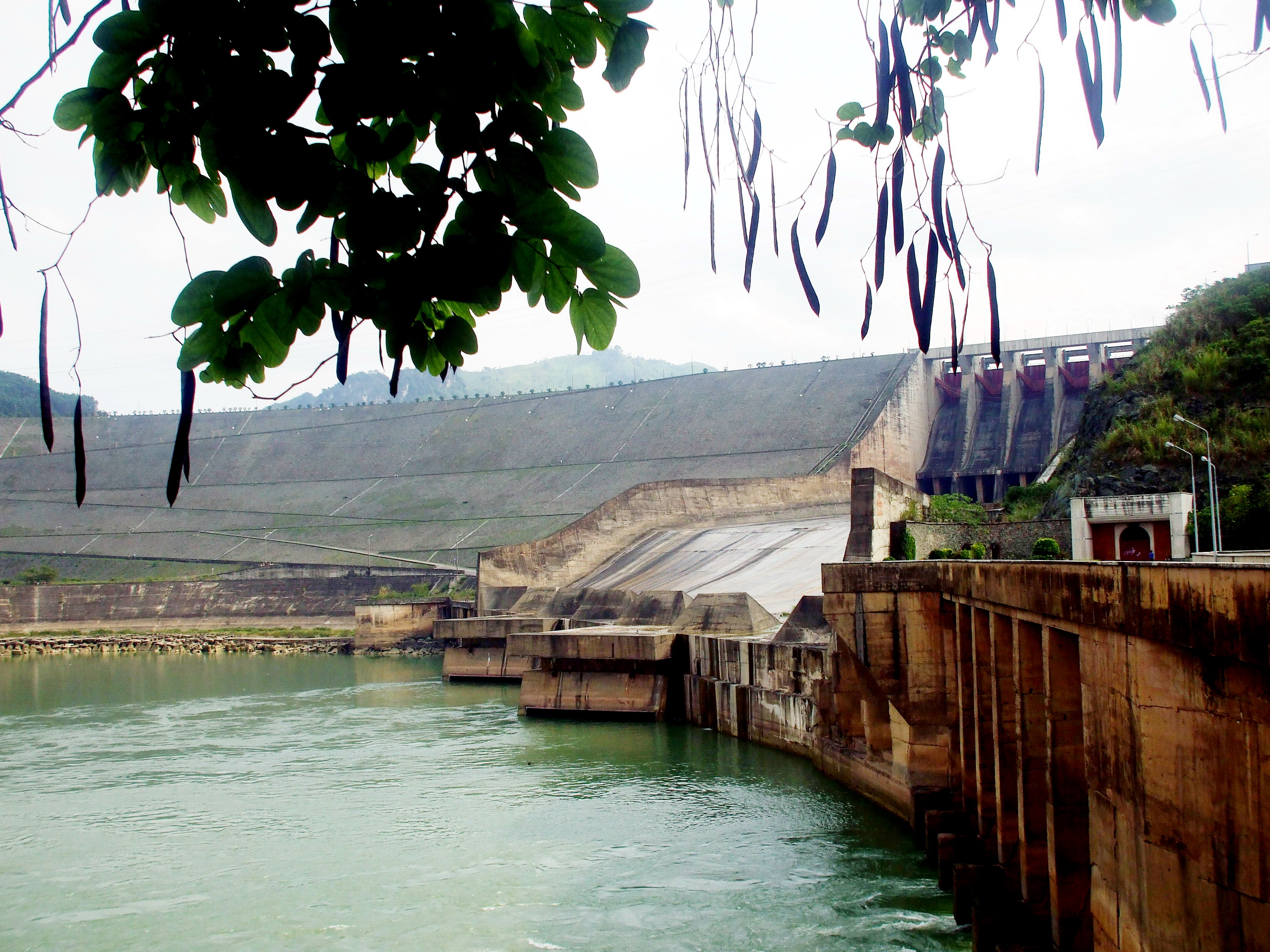
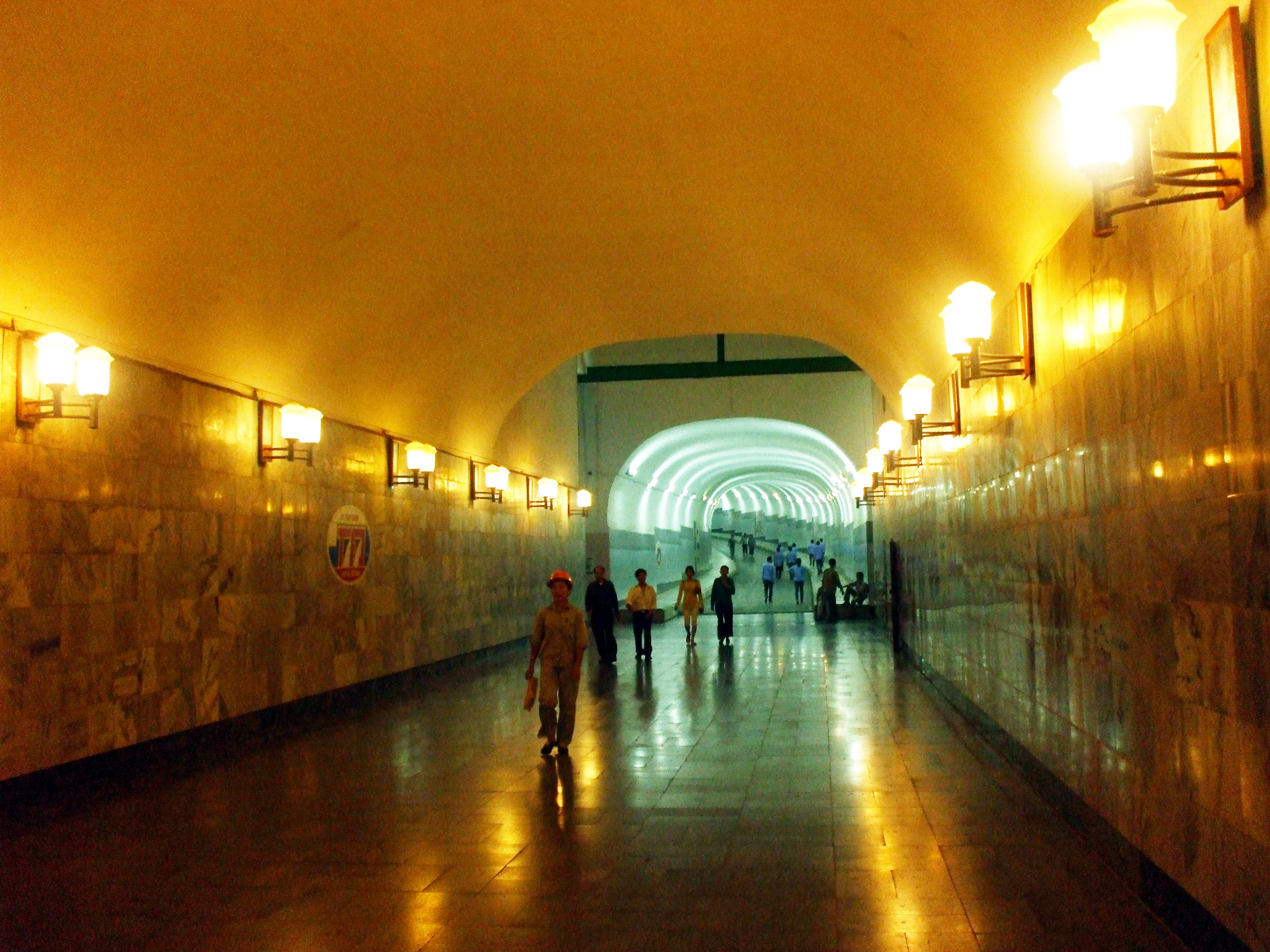
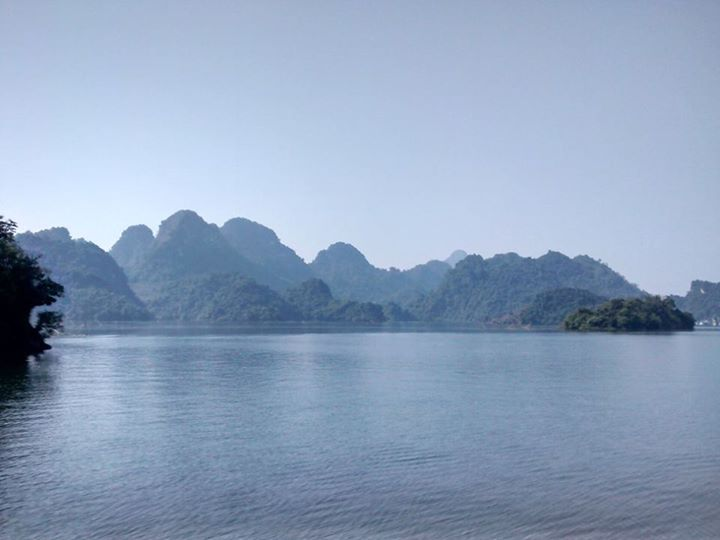
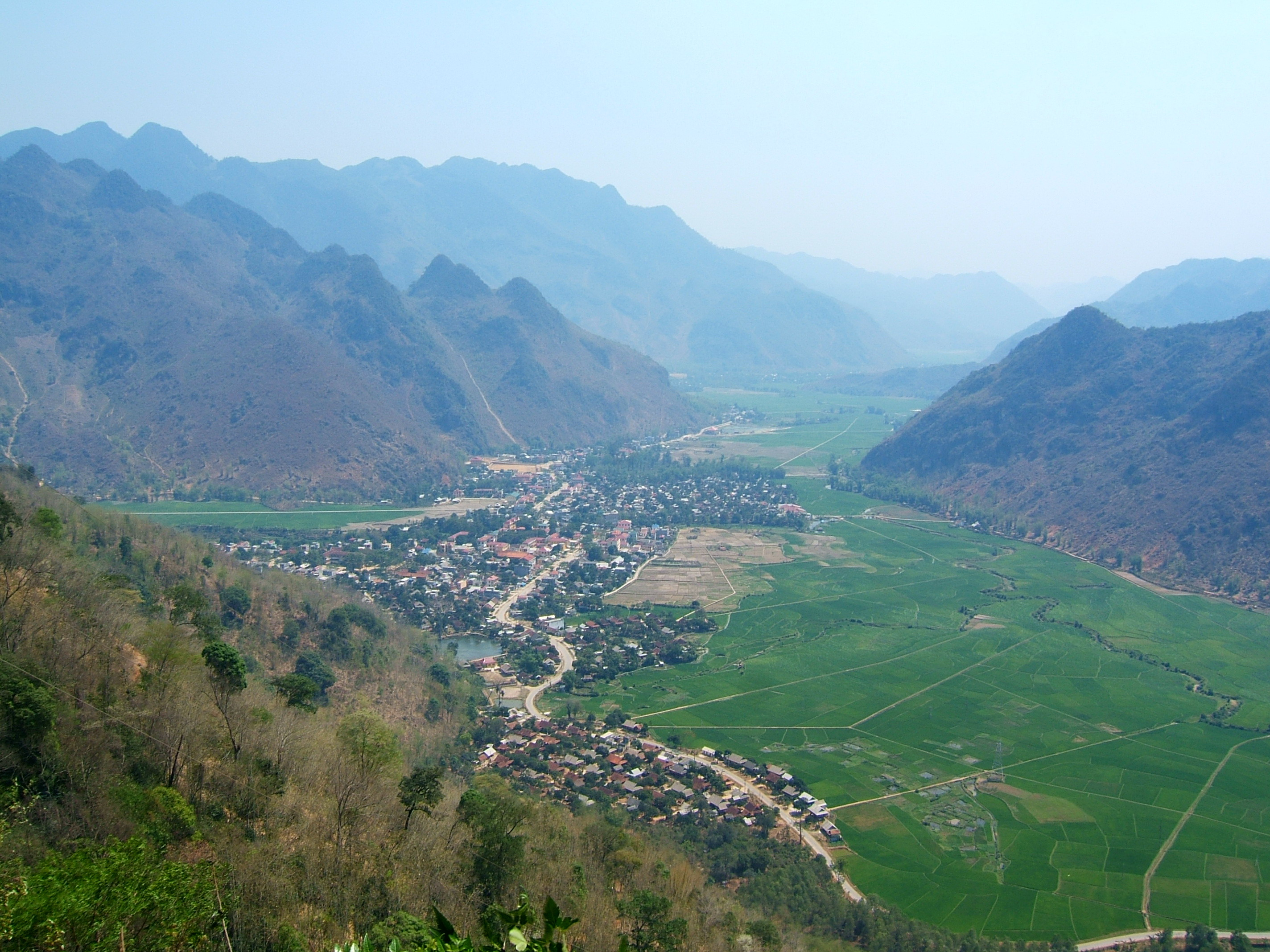
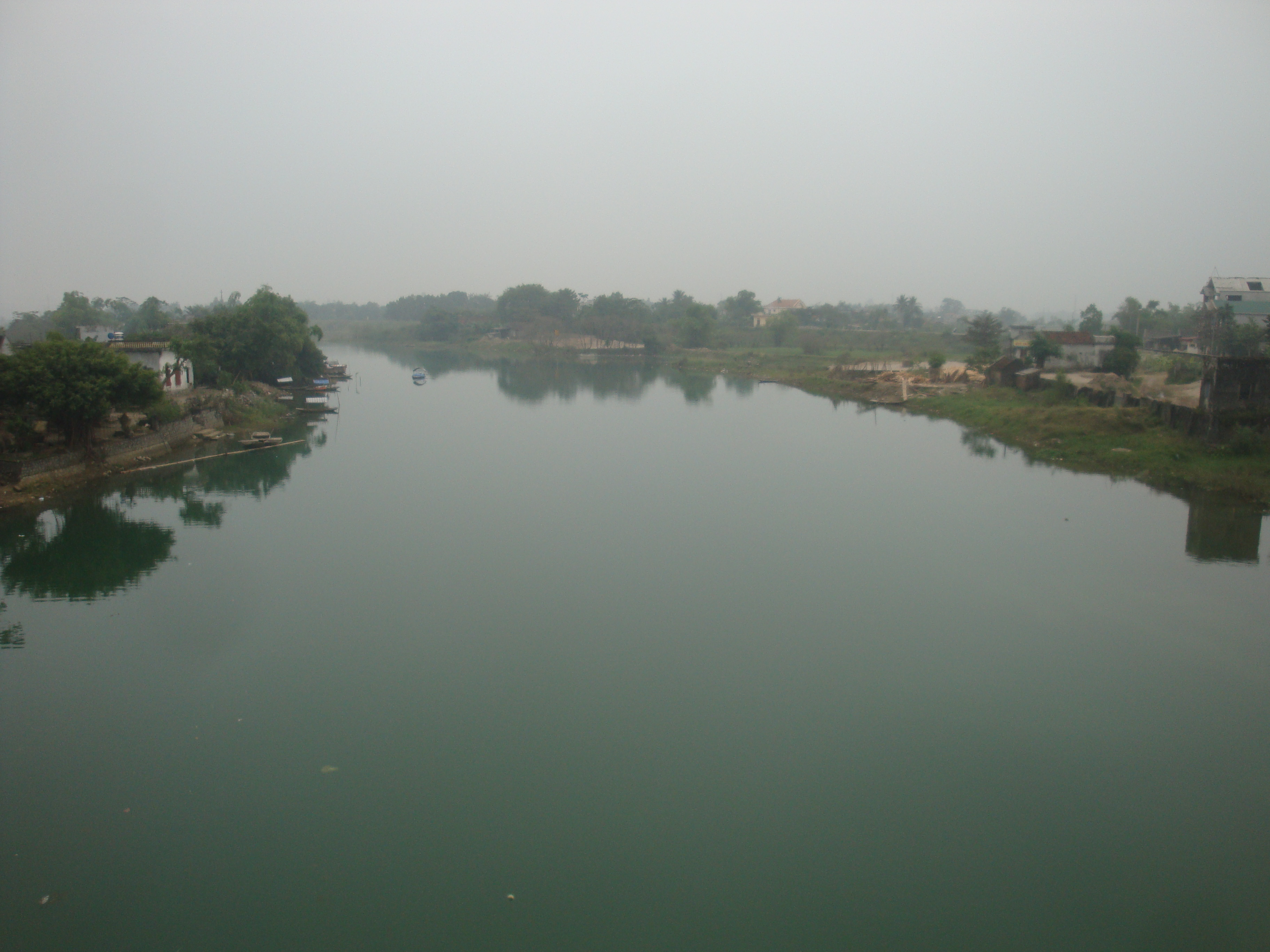

- Seal

- Location of Hòa Bình within Vietnam
- Coordinates: 20°20′N 105°15′E
- Country: Vietnam
- Region: Northwest
- Capital: Hòa Bình
- Subdivision: 1 city and 9 districts

Government
  - Type: Province
  - Body: Hòa Bình Provincial People's Council
  - Chairman of People's Council: Bùi Đức Hinh
  - Chairman of People's Committee: Bùi Văn Khánh

Area
  - Total: 4,590.82 km^{2} (1,772.53 sq mi)

Population (2025)
  - Total: 980,289
  - Density: 213.532/km^{2} (553.046/sq mi)

Ethnic groups
  - Mường: 64.28%
  - Kinh: 25.69%
  - Thái: 4.03%
  - Tày: 3.02%
  - Dao: 2.02%
  - Others: 0.96%

GDP
  - Province: VND 40.867 trillion US$ 1.774 billion
- Time zone: UTC+7 (ICT)
- Area codes: 218
- ISO 3166 code: VN-14
- HDI (2020): ▲0.729 (21st)
- Website: www.hoabinh.gov.vn

Hòa Bình or Hoà Bình (Vietnamese pronunciation: [hʷà ɓìɲ]) was a mountainous province of Vietnam, located in the nation's Northwest region. It bordered Phú Thọ province and Sơn La province to the northwest, Hanoi to the northeast, Hà Nam province to the east, Ninh Bình province to the southeast and Thanh Hóa province to the south. The province covered an area of about 4,590 km^{2} (1,772 mi^{2}) and as of 2022 it had a population of 875,380 people. In 2020, the GDP per capita of the province was estimated to be US$2,625 (equivalent to ₫60,500,000).

On June 12, 2025, Hòa Bình was incorporated into Phú Thọ province.

== History ==
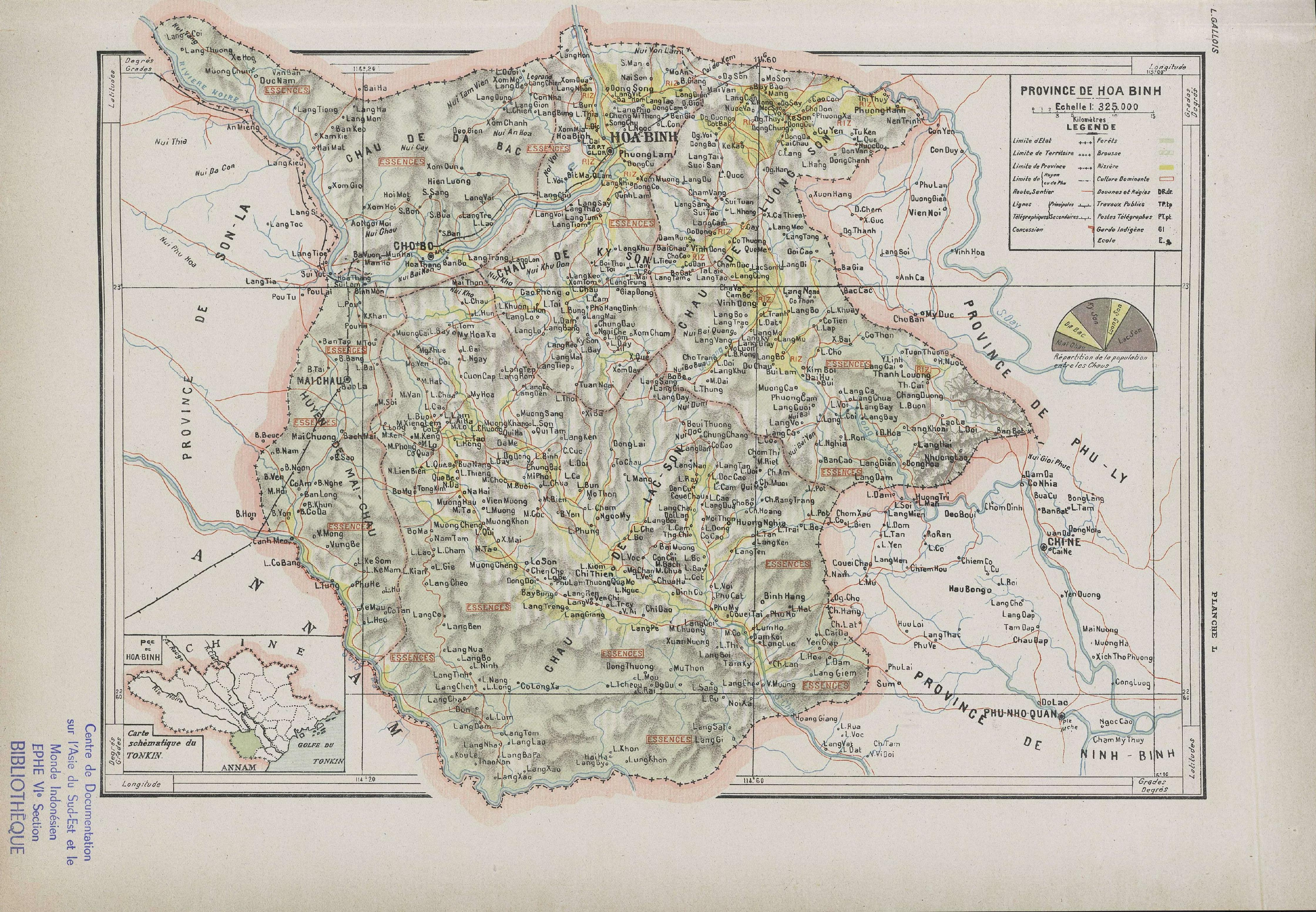
Map of Hoa Binh province in 1909

Hòa Bình province was created on June 22, 1886, following the decree of Tonkin with the name "Mường Province", splitting Mường majority areas from Hưng Hóa province, Sơn Tây province, Hanoi and Ninh Bình province. Its name derives from the Sino-Vietnamese 和平, meaning "peace."

The province was administered from Chợ Bờ (in Đà Bắc District), hence it was also known as "Chợ Bờ Province", until in November of the same year, it was relocated to Phương Lâm District (today in Bất Bạt District, Hà Tây province). In April 1888 it was renamed "Phương Lâm province" by the French colonial authorities.

On March 18, 1891, the Governor-General of French Indochina decreed that the name of the province would change to Hòa Bình province with six districts: Lương Sơn, Kỳ Sơn, Lạc Sơn, Lạc Thủy, Mai Châu and Đà Bắc.

On October 15, 1957, Tân Lạc District was formed from a portion of Lạc Sơn District.

On April 17, 1959, Kim Bôi District was formed from a portion of Lương Sơn District.

On August 17, 1964, Yên Thủy District was formed from a portion of Lạc Thủy District.

On December 12, 2001, Cao Phong District was formed from a portion of Kỳ Sơn District.

On December 17, 2019, Kỳ Sơn District was annexed by the city of Hòa Bình.

On 12 June 2025, as part of major nationwide reforms, Hòa Bình province was dissolved and merged with Phú Thọ province.

== Demographics ==
According to the General Statistics Office of the Government of Vietnam, the population of Hòa Bình province as of 2019 was 854,131 with a density of 186 people per km^{2} over a total land area of 4,590.57 km^{2} (1,772.43 mi^{2}). The male population during this period was 426,923 while the female population was 427,208. The rural population was 719,811 against an urban population of 134,320 (about 19% of the rural population).

There are more than 40 ethnic groups in Hòa Bình recognized by the Vietnamese government. Each ethnicity has their own language, traditions, and subculture. The largest ethnic groups are: Mường (64.28%), Vietnamese (25.69%), Thái (4.03%), Tày (3.92%), Dao (2.02%). Others accounted for the remaining 0.96%.

== Culture ==
Muong Bich Tru village, Hoa Binh: Located in the "populated" area during the construction of the Hoa Binh hydroelectric project, Bich Tru village lost almost all of its arable land and became a lake bed village. Turning difficulties into advantages, Bich Tru people have developed Promote aquaculture and fishing, while focusing on protecting natural landscapes and preserving traditional culture to develop tourism and relaxation. Currently, 53 households in the hamlet have developed 167 cages. fish of all kinds and 4 households combining aquaculture with community tourism development.

== Tourism ==
Hoà Bình is well known for its culture and considered as the cradle of ancient culture in Vietnam. There are five ethnic groups of Muong, Thai, Mong, Tay and Dao living in this province. Besides, this land has various historic relics (184) and natural landscapes for visiting.

A lot of tourist destinations that visitors can explore in Hoa Binh:

Mai Châu is the central town of Mai Châu district. It is famous for its traditional ethnic minority groups, rice terraces and green mountainous landscapes. Tourists can travel by motorbike if they want to enjoy landscapes along the way, using bus or private car. It is 140-150km from Hanoi capital to this place

Thung Nai is a mountainous commune under Cao Phong district considered as the 'Ha Long Bay on land'. Cao Phong is also a fertile land famous for its lush orange orchards.

Kim Bôi hotspring at Kim Bôi district is another must-see destination in Hoà Bình. It takes only 30km away from Hoa Binh city. Tourists can experience a natural mineral water with a constant temperature at 36 degree Celsius, used for drinking, bathing and good for health

Hoà Bình Dam, based at Da river at its time of construction in 1979 was known as the biggest hydropower plant in Southeast Asia. Visitors may visit this place as a historical and significant hydropower in Vietnam.

== Administration ==
Hòa Bình is subdivided into 10 district-level sub-divisions and 151 commune-level sub-divisions.

Administrative divisions of Hòa Bình

Name	Population	Commune-level sub-divisions
City (1)
Hòa Bình	235,718	12 wards, 7 communes
District (9)
Cao Phong District	61,020	1 town, 9 communes
Đà Bắc District	80,970	1 town, 16 communes
Kim Bôi District	190,140	1 town, 16 communes

Name	Population	Commune-level sub-divisions
Lạc Sơn District	214,800	1 town, 23 communes
Lạc Thủy District	105,820	2 towns, 8 communes
Lương Sơn District	167,340	1 town, 10 communes
Mai Châu District	93,000	1 town, 15 communes
Tân Lạc District	233,130	1 town, 15 communes
Yên Thủy District	117,220	1 town, 10 communes
