= Cao Phong district =

Cao Phong district Huyện Cao Phong
- District
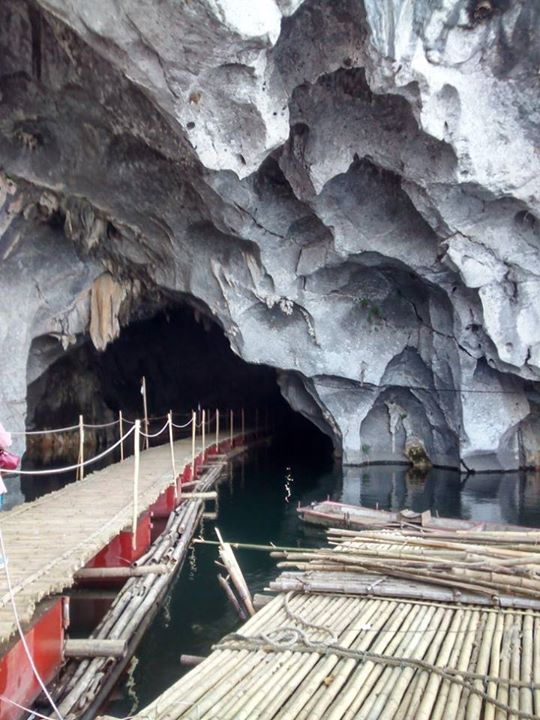
- Thac Bo cave
- Interactive map of Cao Phong district
- Country: Vietnam
- Region: Northwest
- Province: Hòa Bình
- Capital: Cao Phong

Area
  - Total: 98 sq mi (254 km^{2})

Population (2019)
  - Total: 45,470
- Time zone: UTC+7 (Indochina Time)

Cao Phong is a former rural district of Hòa Bình province in the Northwest region of Vietnam. As of 2020 the district had a population of 45,470. The district covers an area of 254 km^{2}. The district capital lies at Cao Phong.
