= Lạc Thủy, Phú Thọ =

Lạc Thủy
- Commune
- Location within Vietnam
- Coordinates: 20°9′3″N 105°46′57″E
- Country: Vietnam
- Region: Northwest
- Province: Phú Thọ

Area
  - Total: 5.72 sq mi (14.82 km^{2})

Population (2019)
  - Total: 7,743
  - Density: 1,350/sq mi (522/km^{2})
- Time zone: UTC+7 (UTC + 7)

Lạc Thủy is a commune of Phú Thọ Province, in the northwestern region of Vietnam.

On June 16, 2025, the Standing Committee of the National Assembly issued Resolution No. 1680/NQ-UBTVQH15 on the reorganization of commune-level administrative units in Phú Thọ Province in 2025. Accordingly, Chi Nê Township, together with Đồng Tâm Commune, Khoan Dụ Commune, and Yên Bồng Commune, were merged to form a new commune named Lạc Thủy Commune.
