= Yên Thủy =

- Commune
- Location within Vietnam
- Coordinates: 20°23′40″N 105°37′20″E
- Country: Vietnam
- Region: Northwest
- Province: Phú Thọ

Area
  - Total: 12.41 sq mi (32.14 km^{2})

Population (2019)
  - Total: 11,503
  - Density: 930/sq mi (358/km^{2})
- Time zone: UTC+7 (UTC + 7)

Yên Thủy is a commune of Phú Thọ Province, in the northwestern region of Vietnam.

On June 16, 2025, the Standing Committee of the National Assembly issued Resolution No. 1680/NQ-UBTVQH15 on the reorganization of commune-level administrative units in Phú Thọ Province in 2025. Accordingly, Hàng Trạm Township, Lạc Thịnh Commune, and Phú Lai Commune were merged to form a new commune named Yên Thủy Commune.
