= Lạc Thủy district =

Coordinates: 20.500°N 105.750°E

Lạc Thủy District Huyện Lạc Thủy
- District
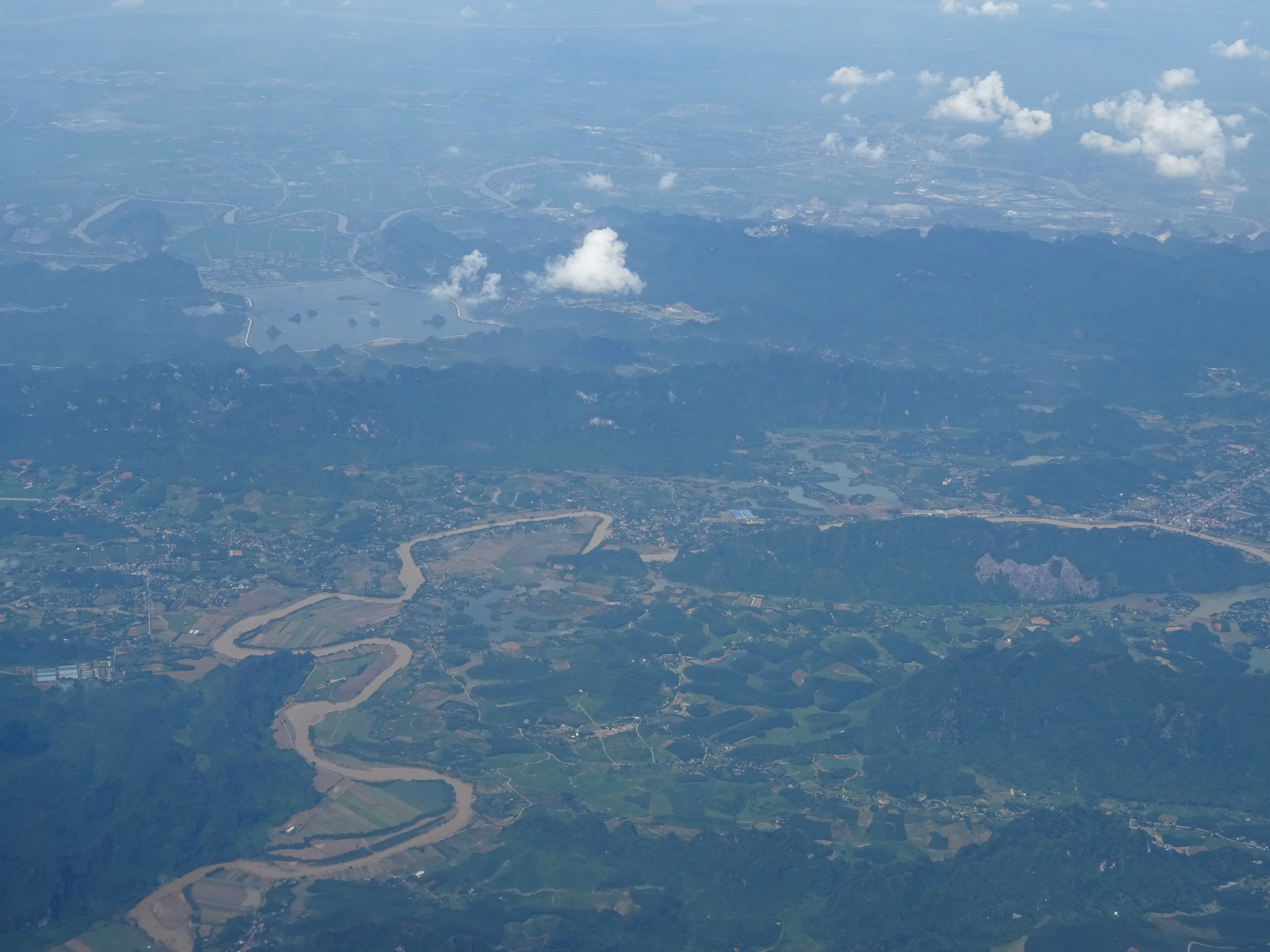
- Interactive map of Lạc Thủy District
- Country: Vietnam
- Region: Northwest
- Province: Hòa Bình
- Capital: Chi Nê

Area
  - Total: 113 sq mi (293 km^{2})

Population (2003)
  - Total: 49,460
- Time zone: UTC+7 (Indochina Time)

Lạc Thủy is a former rural district of Hòa Bình province in the Northwest region of Vietnam. As of 2003, the district had a population of 49,460. The district covers an area of 293 km^{2} (113 sq mi). The district capital lies at Chi Nê.

== Climate ==
Climate data for Chi Nê, Lạc Thủy District
Month	Jan	Feb	Mar	Apr	May	Jun	Jul	Aug	Sep	Oct	Nov	Dec	Year
Record high °C (°F)	33.2 (91.8)	37.0 (98.6)	38.3 (100.9)	40.5 (104.9)	41.7 (107.1)	40.9 (105.6)	40.9 (105.6)	39.8 (103.6)	37.3 (99.1)	35.6 (96.1)	34.9 (94.8)	33.0 (91.4)	41.7 (107.1)
Mean daily maximum °C (°F)	20.3 (68.5)	21.4 (70.5)	23.9 (75.0)	28.4 (83.1)	32.4 (90.3)	33.7 (92.7)	33.6 (92.5)	32.7 (90.9)	31.4 (88.5)	29.0 (84.2)	25.9 (78.6)	22.4 (72.3)	27.9 (82.2)
Daily mean °C (°F)	16.5 (61.7)	17.9 (64.2)	20.5 (68.9)	24.3 (75.7)	27.5 (81.5)	29.1 (84.4)	29.0 (84.2)	28.2 (82.8)	27.0 (80.6)	24.5 (76.1)	21.2 (70.2)	17.7 (63.9)	23.6 (74.5)
Mean daily minimum °C (°F)	14.2 (57.6)	15.8 (60.4)	18.3 (64.9)	21.7 (71.1)	24.3 (75.7)	25.8 (78.4)	25.9 (78.6)	25.3 (77.5)	24.2 (75.6)	21.7 (71.1)	18.1 (64.6)	14.7 (58.5)	20.8 (69.4)
Record low °C (°F)	2.5 (36.5)	5.4 (41.7)	6.8 (44.2)	12.4 (54.3)	16.7 (62.1)	19.8 (67.6)	21.0 (69.8)	22.2 (72.0)	17.2 (63.0)	11.7 (53.1)	6.8 (44.2)	2.3 (36.1)	2.3 (36.1)
Average precipitation mm (inches)	23.0 (0.91)	19.5 (0.77)	42.1 (1.66)	75.8 (2.98)	202.6 (7.98)	227.6 (8.96)	307.5 (12.11)	354.8 (13.97)	343.0 (13.50)	215.7 (8.49)	64.6 (2.54)	19.8 (0.78)	1,896.9 (74.68)
Average rainy days	7.5	9.5	12.7	11.7	13.7	14.4	15.9	16.8	13.7	10.8	6.4	4.6	139.1
Average relative humidity (%)	82.8	84.5	85.7	84.9	81.8	81.7	82.6	85.7	85.0	82.9	81.3	79.5	83.1
Mean monthly sunshine hours	66.3	48.5	50.3	88.0	168.7	167.8	171.7	154.3	152.6	140.2	126.2	112.9	1,449.1
Source: Vietnam Institute for Building Science and Technology, Nchmf.gov.vn (August record high)
