= Văn Chấn =

- Commune
- Interactive map of Văn Chấn
- Coordinates: 21.56570063601708°N 104.57923535958207°E
- Country: Vietnam
- Province: Lào Cai
- Region: Northwest
- Established: 2025
- Seat: Phố Trung Tâm

Area
  - Total: 140.24 km^{2} (54.15 sq mi)

Population (2025)
  - Total: 23,772
  - Density: 169/km^{2} (440/sq mi)

Văn Chấn is a commune in Lào Cai province, Vietnam. The commune inherited its name from the former Văn Chấn district, Yên Bái province.

== History ==
The area of present-day Văn Chấn commune was formerly part of Sơn Thịnh commune in Văn Chấn district.

On 15 May 1995, Nghĩa Lộ township, then the seat of Văn Chấn district, was separated from the district to re-establish Nghĩa Lộ town. The administrative seat of Văn Chấn district was subsequently relocated to Sơn Thịnh commune.

On 10 January 2020, the Standing Committee of the National Assembly of Vietnam issued Resolution No. 871/NQ-UBTVQH14 on the reorganization of district- and commune-level administrative units in Yên Bái province, which took effect on 1 February 2020. Under the resolution, Sơn Thịnh township was established as the district seat of Văn Chấn district from the entire 31.52 km² area and population of 8,831 of Sơn Thịnh commune.

On 16 June 2025, the Standing Committee of the National Assembly of Vietnam issued Resolution No. 1673/NQ-UBTVQH15 on the reorganization of commune-level administrative units in Lào Cai province. Under the resolution, Văn Chấn commune was established from the entire area and population of Sơn Thịnh township and the former communes of Đồng Khê, Suối Bu, and Suối Giàng in Văn Chấn district.
