= Tân Thịnh =

Tân Thịnh may refer to several places in Vietnam, including:

- Tân Thịnh, Hòa Bình, a ward of Hòa Bình city
- Tân Thịnh, Thái Nguyên City, a ward of Thái Nguyên
- Tân Thịnh, Yên Bái, a commune of Yên Bái
- Tân Thịnh, Bắc Giang, a commune of Lạng Giang District
- Tân Thịnh, Nam Định, a commune of Nam Trực District
- Tân Thịnh, Thái Nguyên, a commune of Định Hóa District
- Tân Thịnh, Tuyên Quang, a commune of Chiêm Hóa District
- Tân Thịnh, Yên Bái, a commune of Văn Chấn District
