= Yên Bái (city) =

Former provincial city in Vietnam

- Provincial city (Class-2)
- Yên Bái City; Thành phố Yên Bái
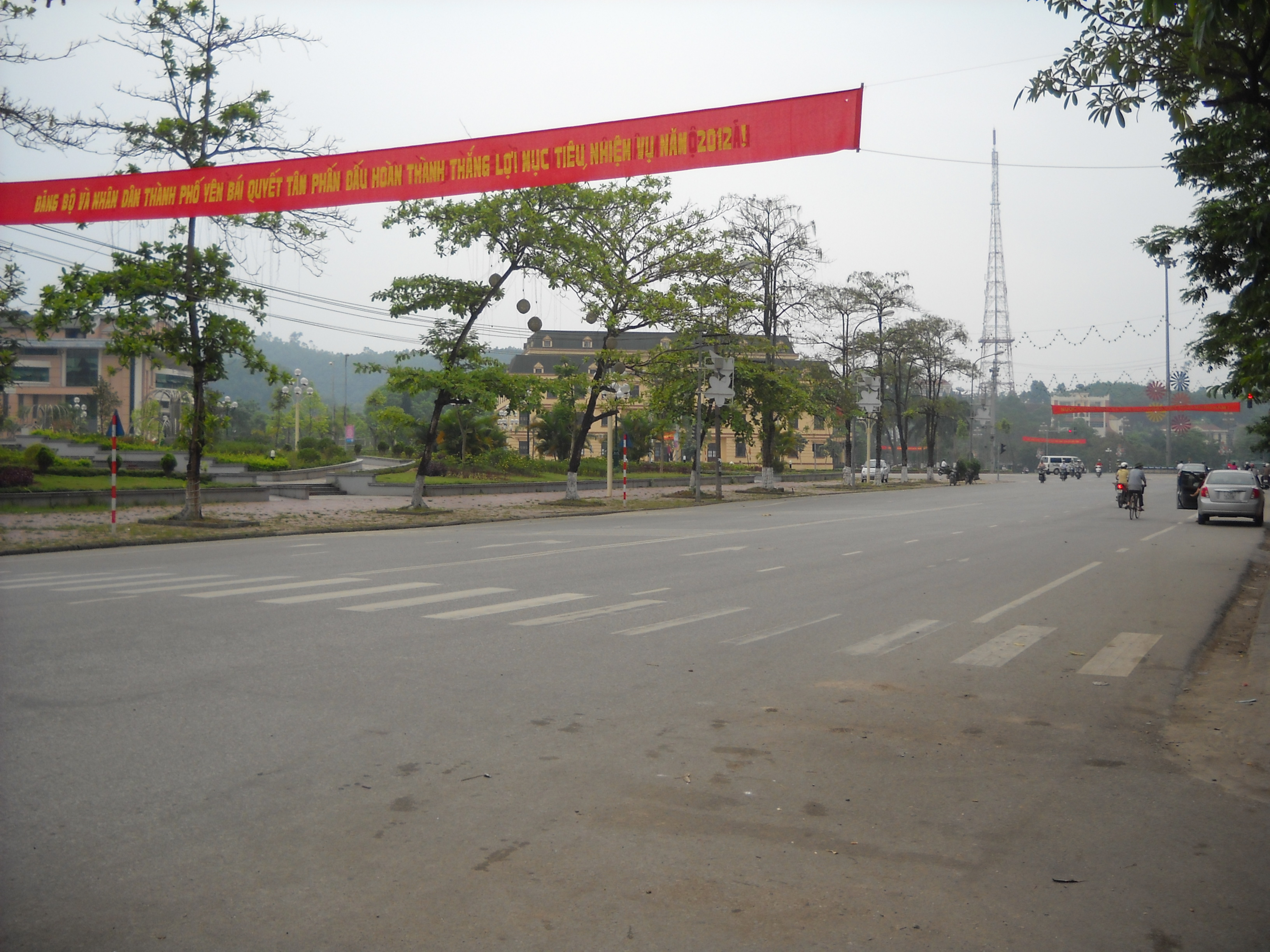
- Yên Bái
- Interactive map of Yên Bái
- Location of in Vietnam
- Coordinates: 21°42′N 104°52′E
- Country: Vietnam
- Province: Yên Bái
- Subdivision: 9 wards and 6 rural communes

Area
  - Total: 108.15 km^{2} (41.76 sq mi)

Population (2019)
  - Total: 100,631
  - Density: 930.48/km^{2} (2,409.9/sq mi)
- Climate: Cwa
- Website: thanhphoyenbai.yenbai.gov.vn

Yên Bái is a former city in Vietnam. It was located in the province of Yen Bai, in the north-east region of Vietnam. The city bordered the former districts of Yên Bình District and Trấn Yên District. The city was a settlement along the banks of the Red River, approximately 183 km northwest of Hanoi. It was one of the important trading hubs between the highlands and the lowlands of Northern Vietnam.

== History ==
At the end of the sixteenth century Yên Bái was a small village in Bach Lam district, Quy Hoa district, Hung Hoa province. On April 11, 1900, Yen Bai province was established by the French colonialist government. The city grew in size with the opening of the Hanoi–Lào Cai railway, which attracted many migrants.

On February 10, 1930, part of the 4th Regiment of Tonkinese Rifles stationed at Yen Bai mutinied against their French officers in the Yên Bái mutiny. They were suppressed by loyal troops from the same unit. This incident led to widespread disturbances against French rule across northeastern Vietnam during 1930–31.

On July 1, 2025, as per the plan to arrange and merge administrative units in Vietnam, Yên Bái province and Lào Cai province merged to become the new Lào Cai province. In addition to the merge, due to the disestablishment of the "provincial city" tier according to the plan, the capital of Yên Bái province, Yên Bái city was disbanded. The former Yên Bái city was divided into 4 wards: Yên Bái ward, Văn Phú ward, Nam Cường ward and Âu Lâu ward.

Yên Bái ward is currently the new capital of the new Lào Cai province.

== Demographics ==
As of 2019, the city had a population of 100,631, covering an area of 108.15 km^{2}.

== Administrative divisions ==
Yên Bái contained and administered 9 wards and 6 rural communes:

- Đồng Tâm
- Hồng Hà
- Hợp Minh
- Minh Tân
- Nam Cường
- Nguyễn Phúc
- Nguyễn Thái Học
- Yên Ninh
- Yên Thịnh

Rural communes:

- Âu Lâu
- Giới Phiên
- Minh Bảo
- Tân Thịnh
- Tuy Lộc
- Văn Phú

== Climate ==
Climate data for Yên Bái
Month	Jan	Feb	Mar	Apr	May	Jun	Jul	Aug	Sep	Oct	Nov	Dec	Year
Record high °C (°F)	30.4 (86.7)	34.8 (94.6)	35.5 (95.9)	37.9 (100.2)	40.0 (104.0)	40.4 (104.7)	39.8 (103.6)	39.6 (103.3)	37.8 (100.0)	37.2 (99.0)	34.0 (93.2)	30.8 (87.4)	40.4 (104.7)
Mean daily maximum °C (°F)	19.2 (66.6)	20.3 (68.5)	23.2 (73.8)	27.2 (81.0)	31.3 (88.3)	32.7 (90.9)	32.6 (90.7)	32.5 (90.5)	31.5 (88.7)	28.8 (83.8)	25.3 (77.5)	21.6 (70.9)	27.2 (81.0)
Daily mean °C (°F)	15.8 (60.4)	17.1 (62.8)	19.9 (67.8)	23.6 (74.5)	26.8 (80.2)	28.2 (82.8)	28.2 (82.8)	27.8 (82.0)	26.7 (80.1)	24.3 (75.7)	20.8 (69.4)	17.3 (63.1)	23.0 (73.4)
Mean daily minimum °C (°F)	13.6 (56.5)	15.1 (59.2)	17.9 (64.2)	21.3 (70.3)	23.8 (74.8)	25.2 (77.4)	25.3 (77.5)	24.9 (76.8)	23.8 (74.8)	21.5 (70.7)	18.0 (64.4)	14.6 (58.3)	20.4 (68.7)
Record low °C (°F)	3.3 (37.9)	5.1 (41.2)	6.8 (44.2)	11.0 (51.8)	16.8 (62.2)	18.6 (65.5)	19.5 (67.1)	18.3 (64.9)	16.9 (62.4)	11.3 (52.3)	6.8 (44.2)	2.9 (37.2)	2.9 (37.2)
Average rainfall mm (inches)	36.3 (1.43)	40.8 (1.61)	72.6 (2.86)	123.1 (4.85)	222.9 (8.78)	262.4 (10.33)	309.0 (12.17)	364.2 (14.34)	272.9 (10.74)	163.6 (6.44)	62.8 (2.47)	29.9 (1.18)	1,960.6 (77.19)
Average rainy days	14.4	16.4	20.7	20.3	16.5	16.3	18.5	18.2	14.2	11.6	9.1	9.3	185.9
Average relative humidity (%)	87.2	88.0	88.5	87.9	84.3	84.6	85.6	86.2	85.6	85.2	85.0	84.8	86.1
Mean monthly sunshine hours	51.7	40.3	43.0	73.7	147.1	149.5	163.5	174.5	169.5	140.0	119.3	97.3	1,363.9
Source: Vietnam Institute for Building Science and Technology
