= Phuc Son (disambiguation) =

Phúc Sơn is a commune of Hanoi.

Phúc Sơn may also refer to:

- Phúc Sơn, Yên Bái, a former rural commune of Nghĩa Lộ.
- Phúc Sơn, Nghệ An, a former rural commune of Anh Sơn district.
- Phúc Sơn, Tuyên Quang, a former rural commune of Chiêm Hóa district.
