= Yên Bái province =

Former province of Vietnam

Yên Bái
- Province
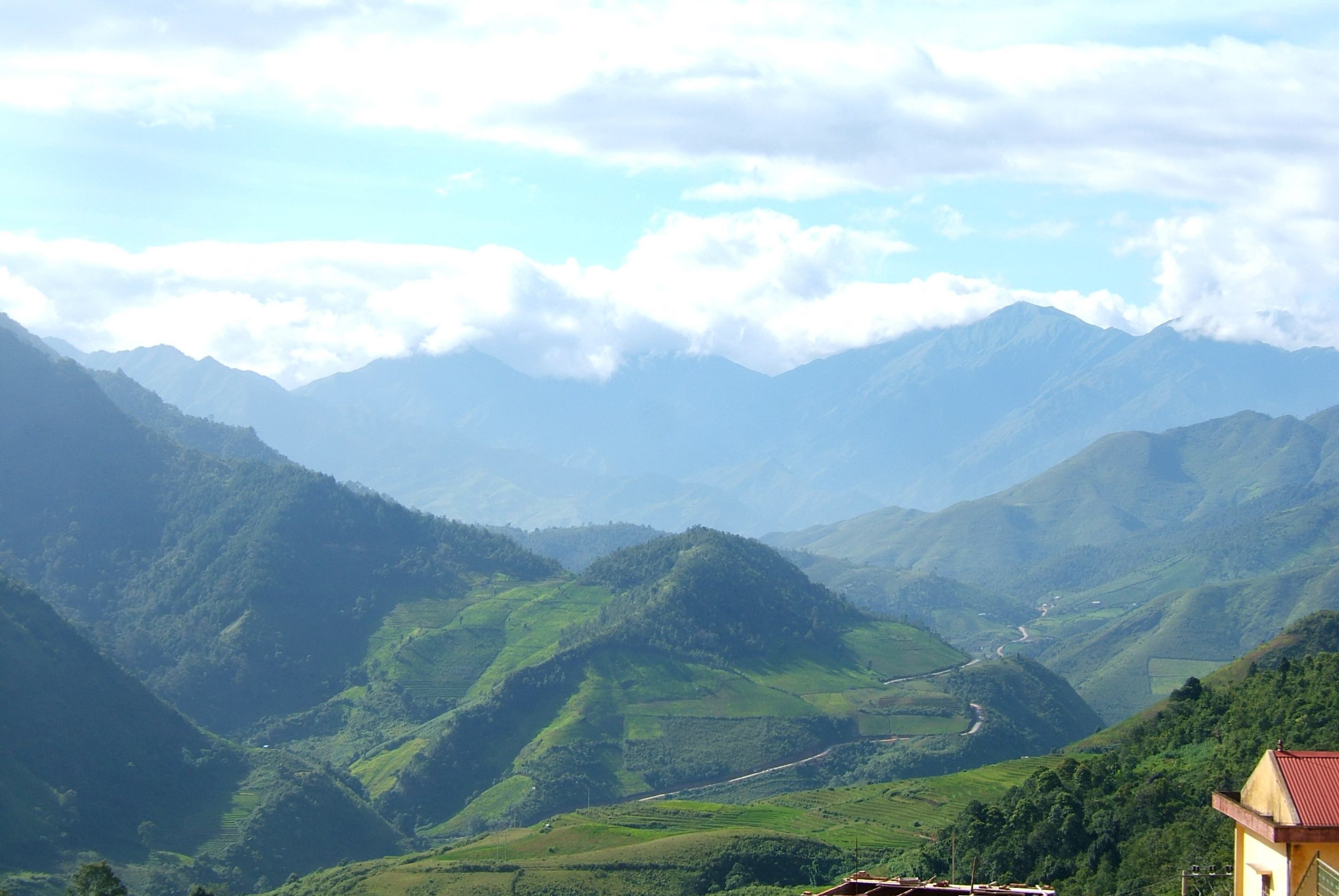
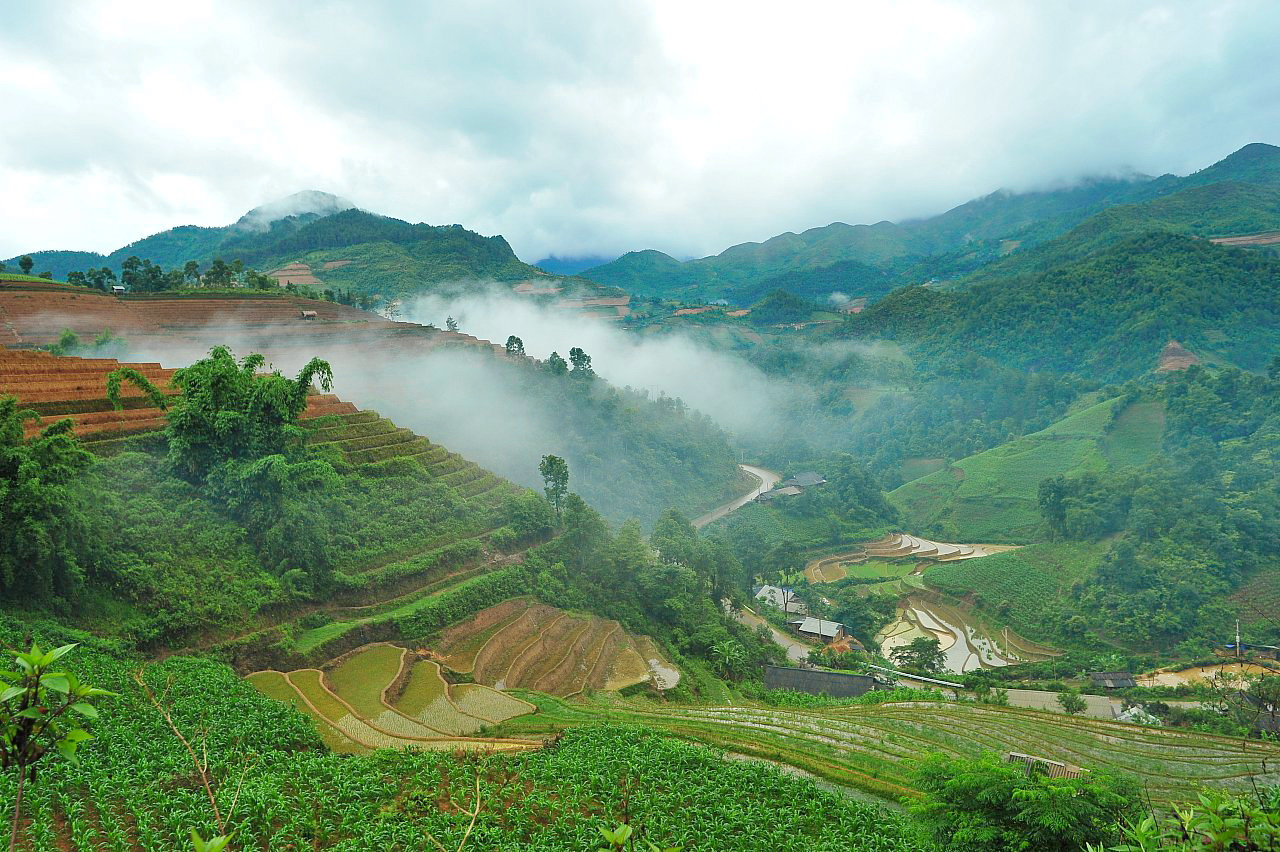
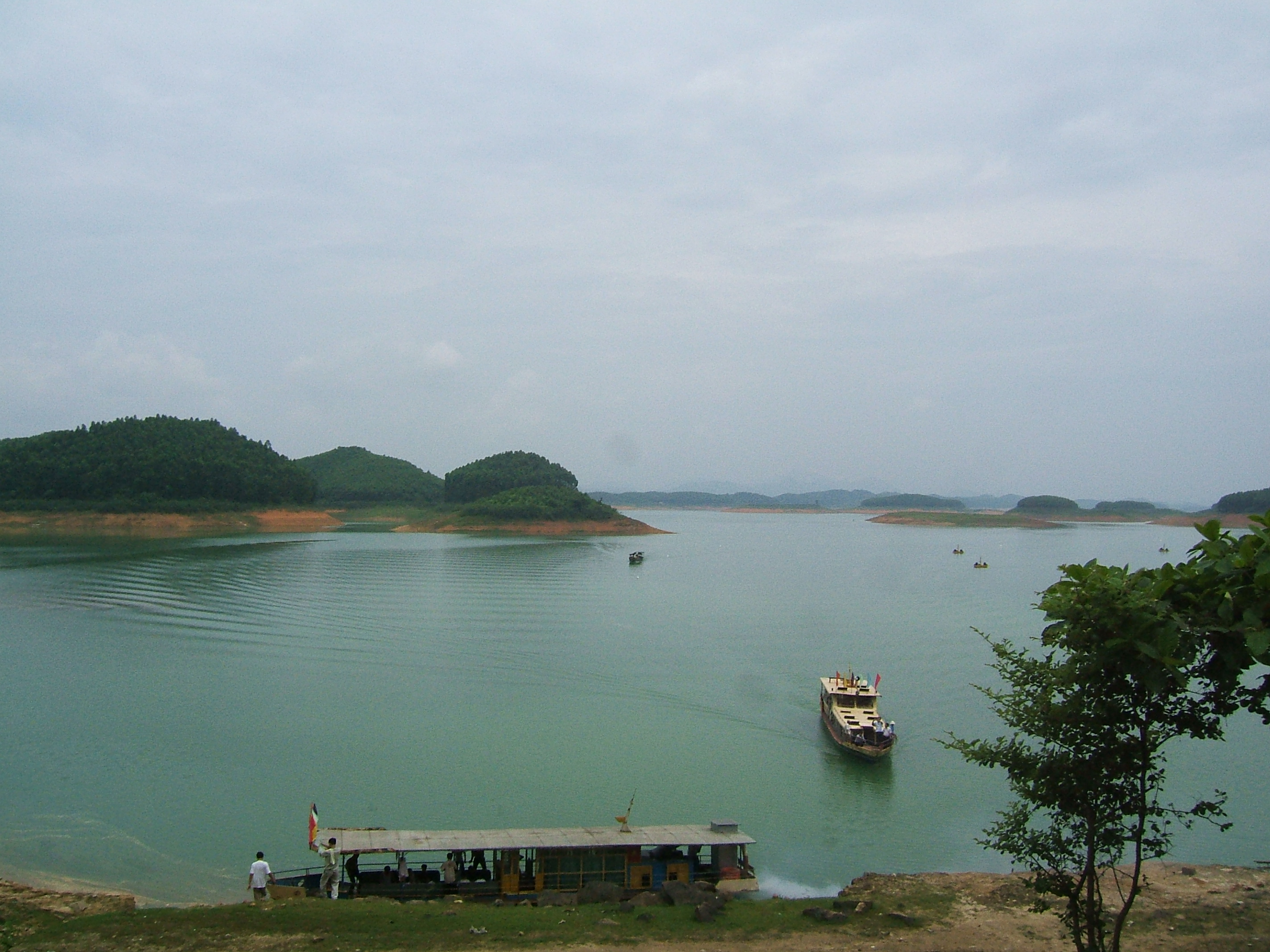
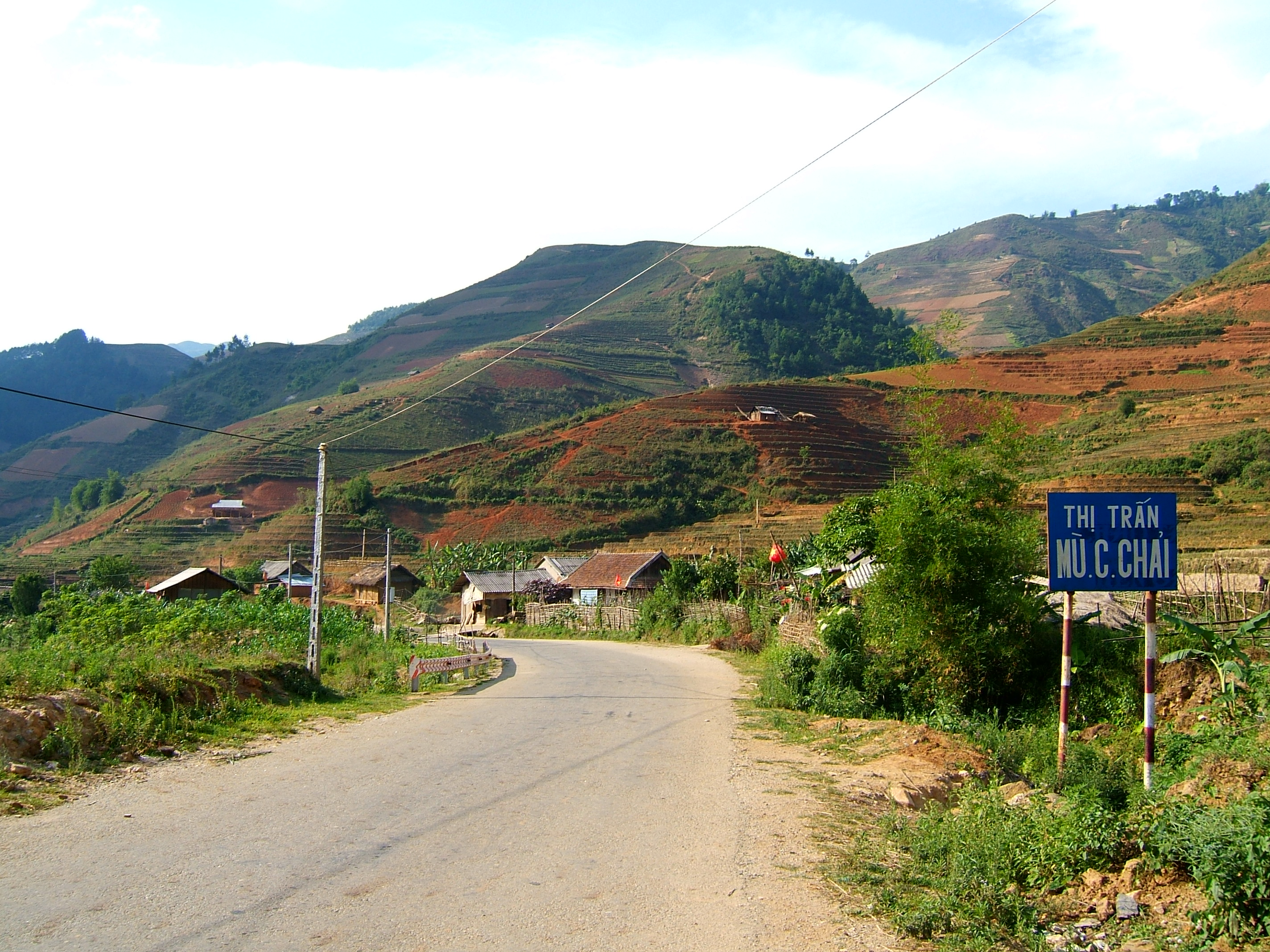
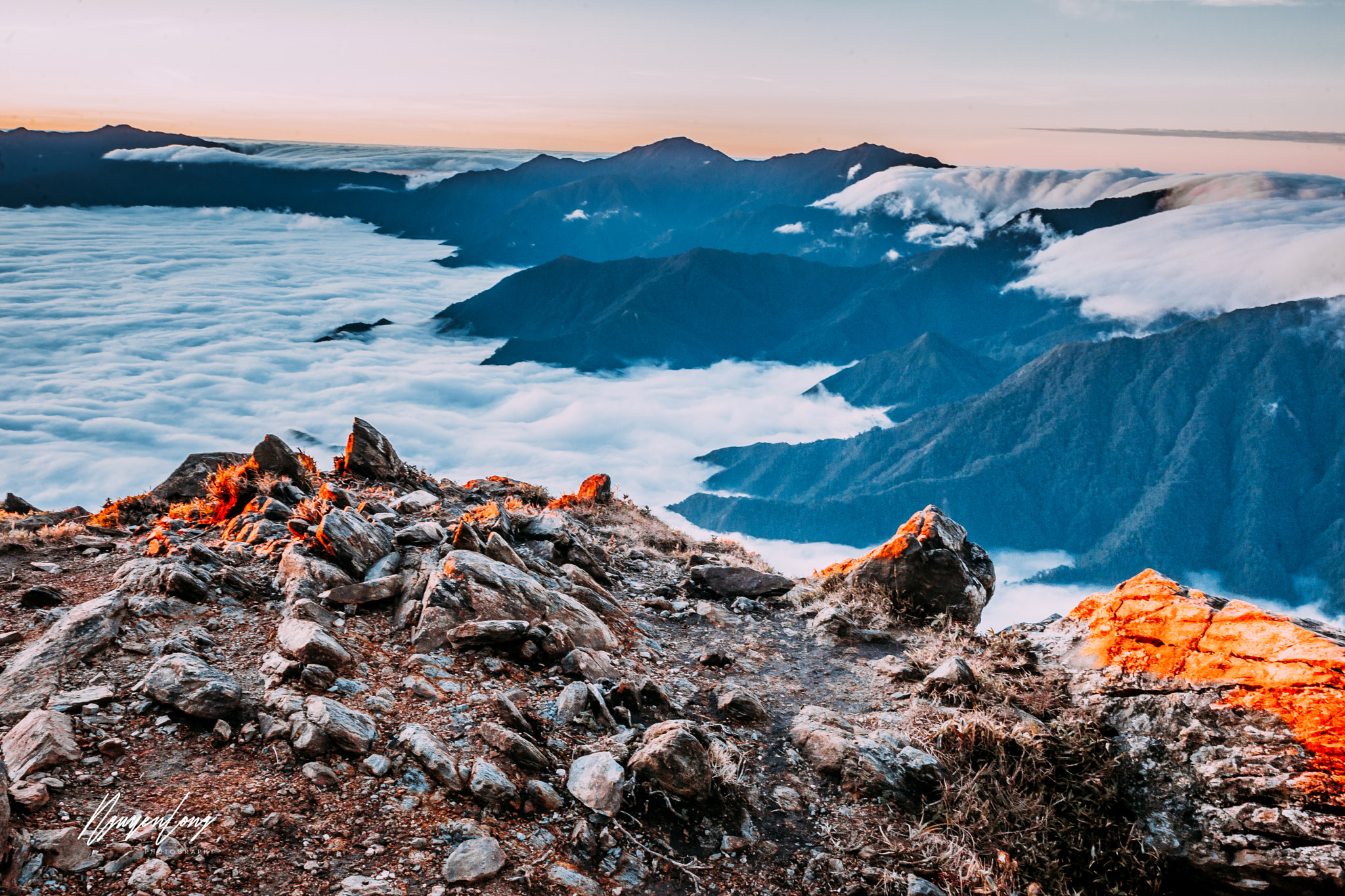
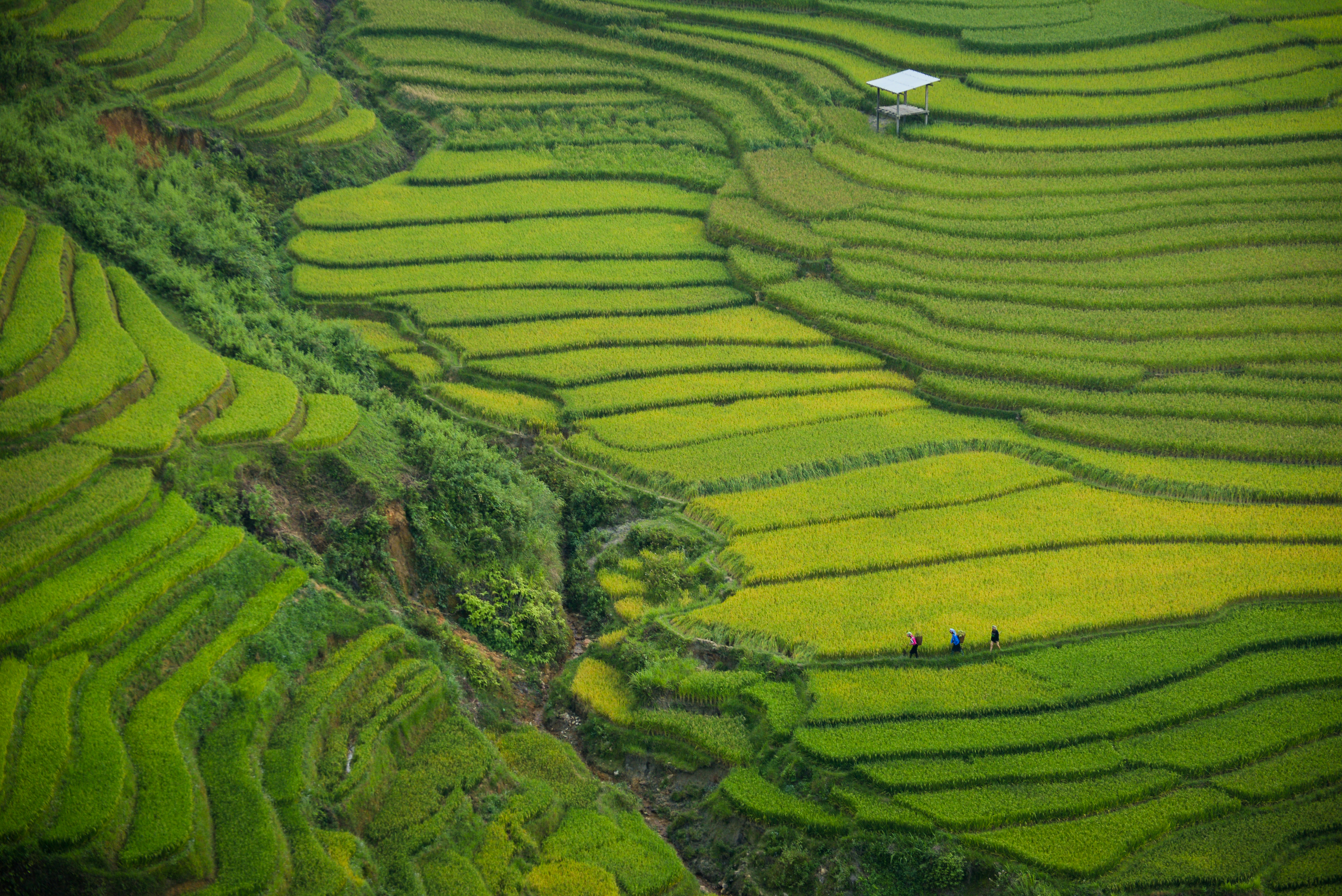
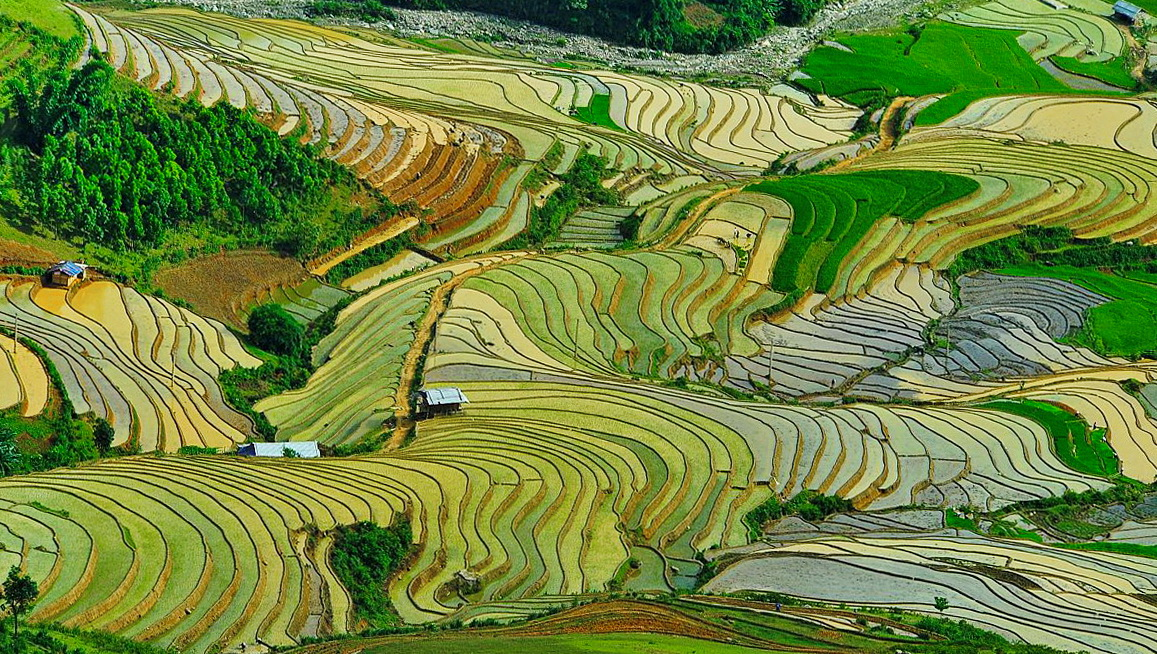
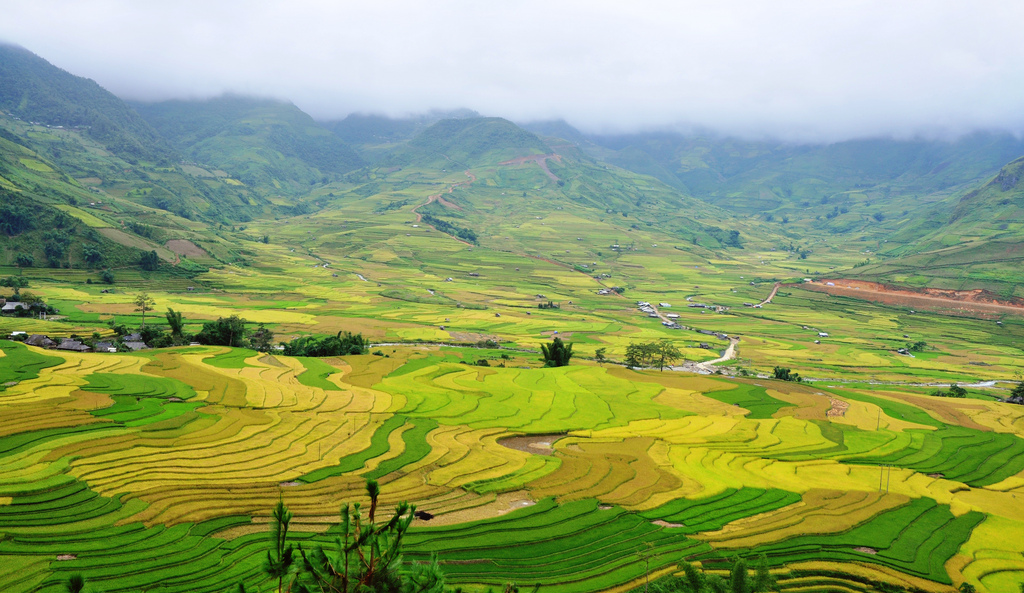
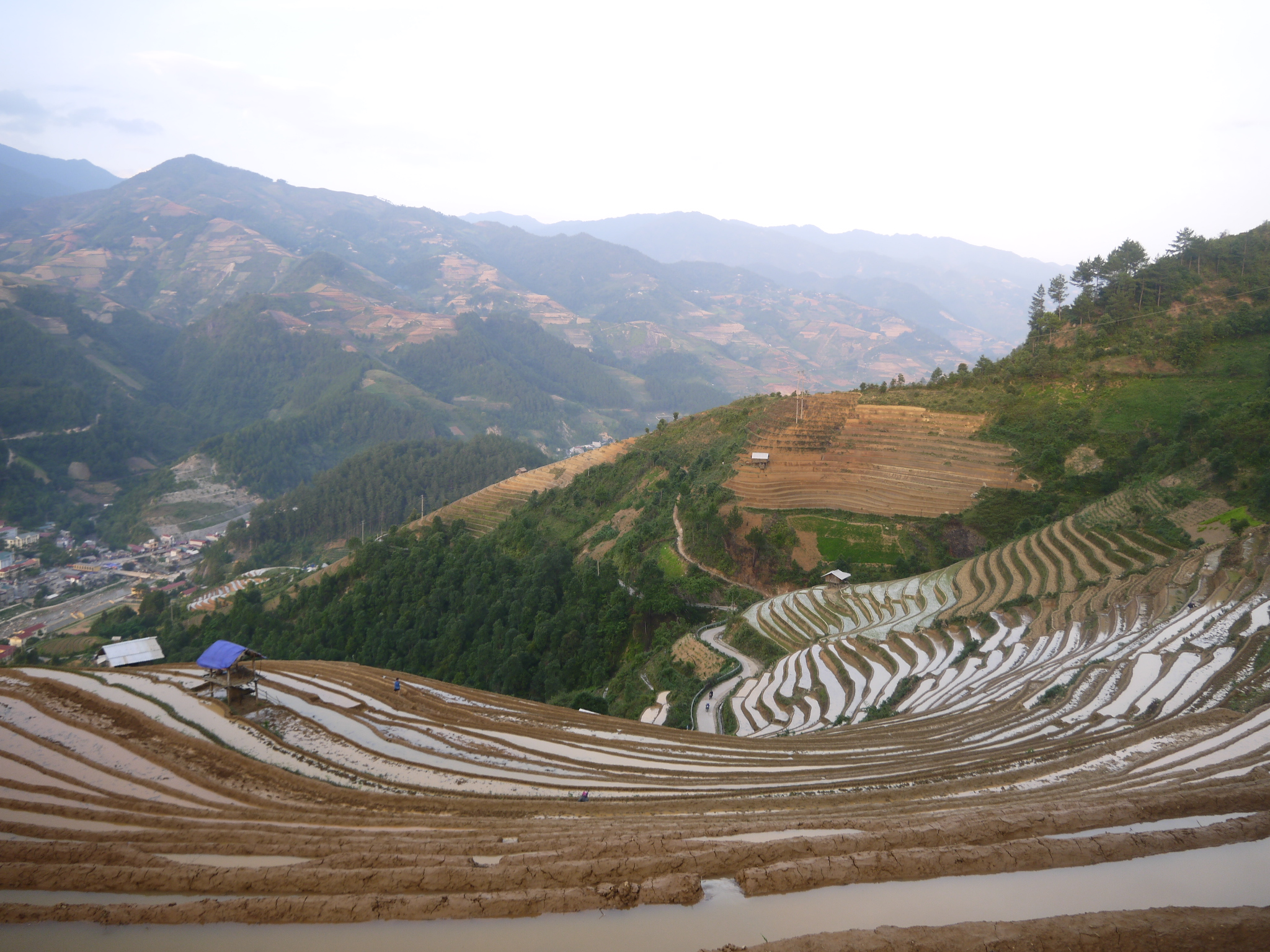
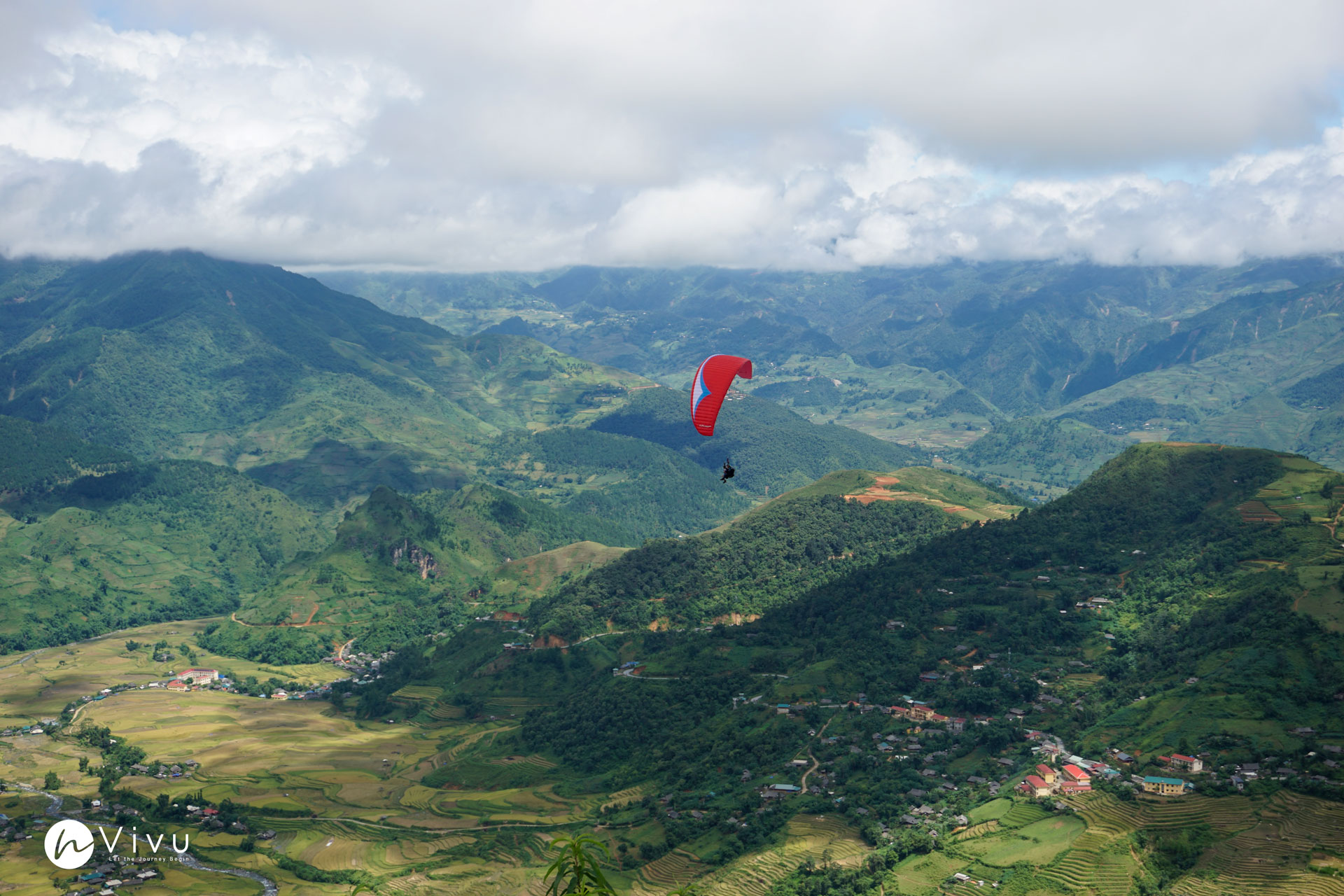
- Mù Cang Chải • Thác Bà Lake • Tà Chì Nhù Mountain

- Seal
- Nickname: Tranquillity
- Location of Yên Bái within Vietnam
- Coordinates: 21°30′N 104°40′E
- Country: Vietnam
- Region: Northwest
- Capital: Yên Bái provincial city
- Subdivision: 1 provincial city, 7 districts and 1 district-level town

Government
  - Type: Province
  - Body: Yên Bái Provincial People's Council
  - Chairman of People's Council: Phạm Thị Thanh Trà
  - Chairman of People's Committee: Trần Huy Tuấn

Area
  - Total: 6,892.67 km^{2} (2,661.27 sq mi)

Population (2025)
  - Total: 941,872
  - Density: 136.648/km^{2} (353.918/sq mi)

Ethnic groups
  - Vietnamese: 42.71%
  - Tày: 18.28%
  - Mông: 13.04%
  - Dao: 12.33%
  - Thái: 7.58%
  - Others: 6.06%

GDP
  - Province: VND 27.404 trillion US$ 1.190 billion
- Time zone: UTC+7 (ICT)
- Area codes: 216
- ISO 3166 code: VN-06
- HDI (2020): ▲0.659 (58th)
- Website: yenbai.gov.vn

Yên Bái was a former province (1900 – 1975; 1991 – 2025) located in Northwest Vietnam. It shared borders with six provinces which are Hà Giang province, Lào Cai province, Lai Châu province, Sơn La province, Phú Thọ province, and Tuyên Quang province. The province covered an area of about 6,893 km^{2} (2,661 mi^{2}) and as of 2022 it had a population of 847,250 people.

Yên Bái's history is important under the French colony, particularly the subsequent "Yên Bái mutiny", an uprising of Vietnamese soldiers in the French colonial army on 10 February 1930 in collaboration with civilian supporters who were members of the Việt Nam Quốc Dân Đảng (VNQDD, the Vietnamese Nationalist Party).

Forestry and farming were the main economic stays of the province. Thác Bà Lake is a natural asset of the country along with its Thác Bà Hydroelectric Plant. Dong Cuong Festival is an important festival of the province.

On June 12, 2025, Yên Bái province was merged with Lào Cai province to form the current province of Lào Cai.

== Demographics ==
According to the General Statistics Office of the Government of Vietnam, the population of Yên Bái province as on 2019 was 821,030 with a density of 119 persons per km^{2} over a total land area of 6,887.46 square kilometres (2,659.26 mi^{2}) of the province. The male population during this period was 412,977 while the female population was 408,053.

There are multiple ethnic groups in Yên Bái province. The Kinh people, who form the majority population of the country, settled here a long time ago and in union with the local minority tribes established themselves in the region and developed cultivation practices. The Kinh people's ancestry is traced to the Hải Dương Pham Ba Luc for nine generations till date and a monument erected in 1937 in Doc village in Hong Commune is highly revered as an ancestral home.

There are 4 ethnic Yao (Dao) branches in Yên Bái province (Nguyễn 2013:12).

- Dao Đỏ [Red Yao] (Dao Đại Bản, Dao Sừng)
- Dao Quần Chẹt [Tight-trouser Yao] (Dao Nga Hoàng, Dao Sơn Đầu)
- Dao Quần Trắng [White-trouser Yao]
- Dao Làn Tuyển [Indigo Yao] (Dao Tuyển)

== History ==
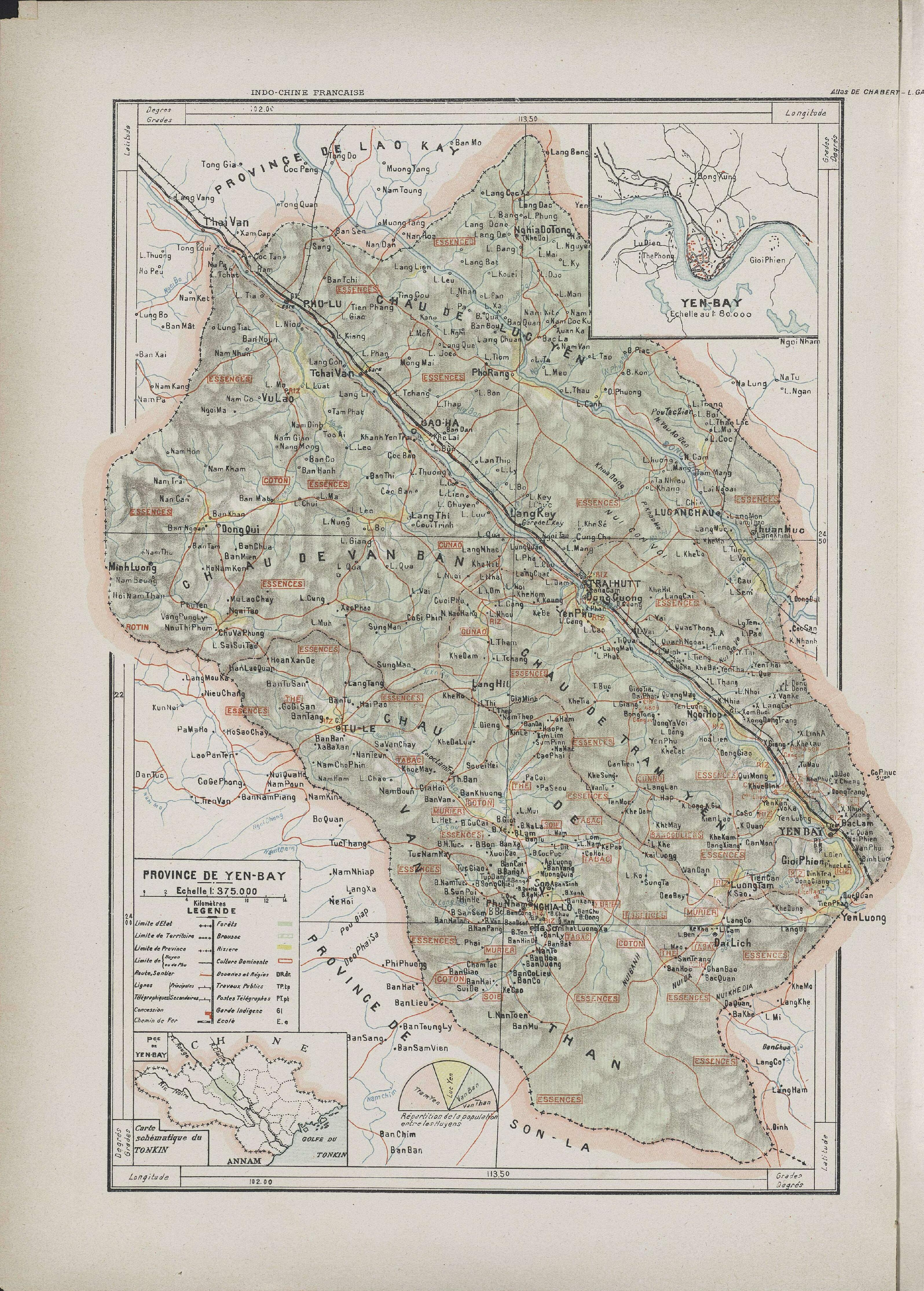
Map of Yen Bay province in 1909

The area was occupied in ancient times, given the favourable communications along the Hong and Chay Rivers. Several archaeological digs in the province have unearthed ancient temples and other sites. Stone tools have been excavated in Mù Cang Chải District.

Vietnam had gradually become a French colony between 1859 and 1883. Initially, military resistance to French rule came through the Cần Vương movement led by Tôn Thất Thuyết and Phan Đình Phùng, which sought to install the boy Emperor Hàm Nghi at the head of an independent nation. However, with the death of Phùng in 1895, military opposition effectively ended. The only other notable incidents after this came in 1917 was the Thái Nguyên rebellion. The lack of militant activity changed in the late 1920s with the formation of the VNQDĐ, or Vietnamese Nationalist Party. The VNQDĐ attempted clandestine activities to undermine French rule, which resulted in French scrutiny of their activities. This led to their leadership group taking the risk of staging a large scale military attack in the Red River Delta in Northern Vietnam. It was only on 10 February 1931 that VNQDĐ could, in collaboration with civilian supporters, launch the Yên Bái mutiny, an uprising of Vietnamese soldiers in the French colonial army. Thus, Yên Bái was the first of the battles during the First Indochina War. Yên Bái and Thái Nguyên were key military posts of the Việt Minh, which were supplied with arms from China to fight the French during this War.

On 9 February 1930 part of the 4th Regiment of Tonkinese Rifles stationed at Yên Bái mutinied against their French officers but were suppressed by loyal troops from the same unit. The attack was the largest disturbance against the colonisation of Vietnam since the Cần Vương monarchist movement of the late 19th century. The aim of the revolt was to inspire a wider uprising among the general populace in an attempt to overthrow the colonial regime and establish independence. The Việt Nam Quốc Dân Đảng (VNQDĐ, the Vietnamese Nationalist Party) had previously attempted to engage in clandestine activities to undermine French rule, but increasing French scrutiny on their activities led to their leadership group taking the risk of staging a large scale military attack in the Red River Delta in northern Vietnam. This incident led to widespread disturbances against French rule across northeastern Vietnam during 1930–31.

In the "Yen Bai Uprising of 1930" against the French colonial rule, a number of French army officers were killed. To putdown the uprising, the French resorted to aerial bombardment and even napalm bombs were used. The rebellion was put down by the French within a day; a number of Vietnamese soldiers and 12 VNQDĐ leaders were executed. Following this repressive action by the French, there were frequent anti-colonialist strikes and riots throughout the country, which were all put down ruthlessly. This resulted in breaking the backbone of the VNQDD and the Communist Party in North Vietnam for a considerable period.

The French maintained control of their colonies until World War II, when the Japanese war in the Pacific triggered the invasion of French Indochina in 1941.

In 1961, a large bronze cylindrical jar was discovered with carved images of males and females in copulation. In 1964 an 80,000-year-old skeleton was unearthed in Hum Cave in Lục Yên District. In 1996, another bronze jar was discovered along with the 2000-year-old remains of a 6-year-old girl on Choi Mountain in the commune of Hợp Minh, Trấn Yên District.

== Geography and climate ==
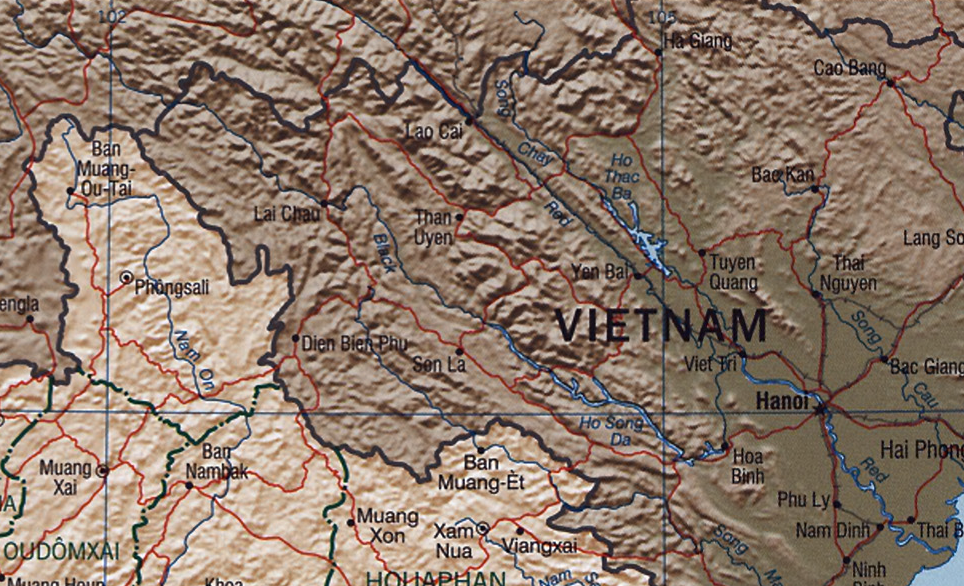
Map showing Thác Bà Lake and Red River.

Yên Bái covers an area of 6,899.5 km^{2} (2,663.9 sq mi), and the Red River passes through the province. Yên Bái is a mountain province, characterised by rugged mountainous scenery and green rice paddy fields in the valleys. The Hoàng Liên Sơn mountain range runs through the province. The Red (or Thao) River and Chay River flow the province. Their origin is in Yunnan, China. The valley created by these two river systems in the Yên Bái province is fertile, though an uneven territory; Muong Lo plain is the rice bowl of the province.

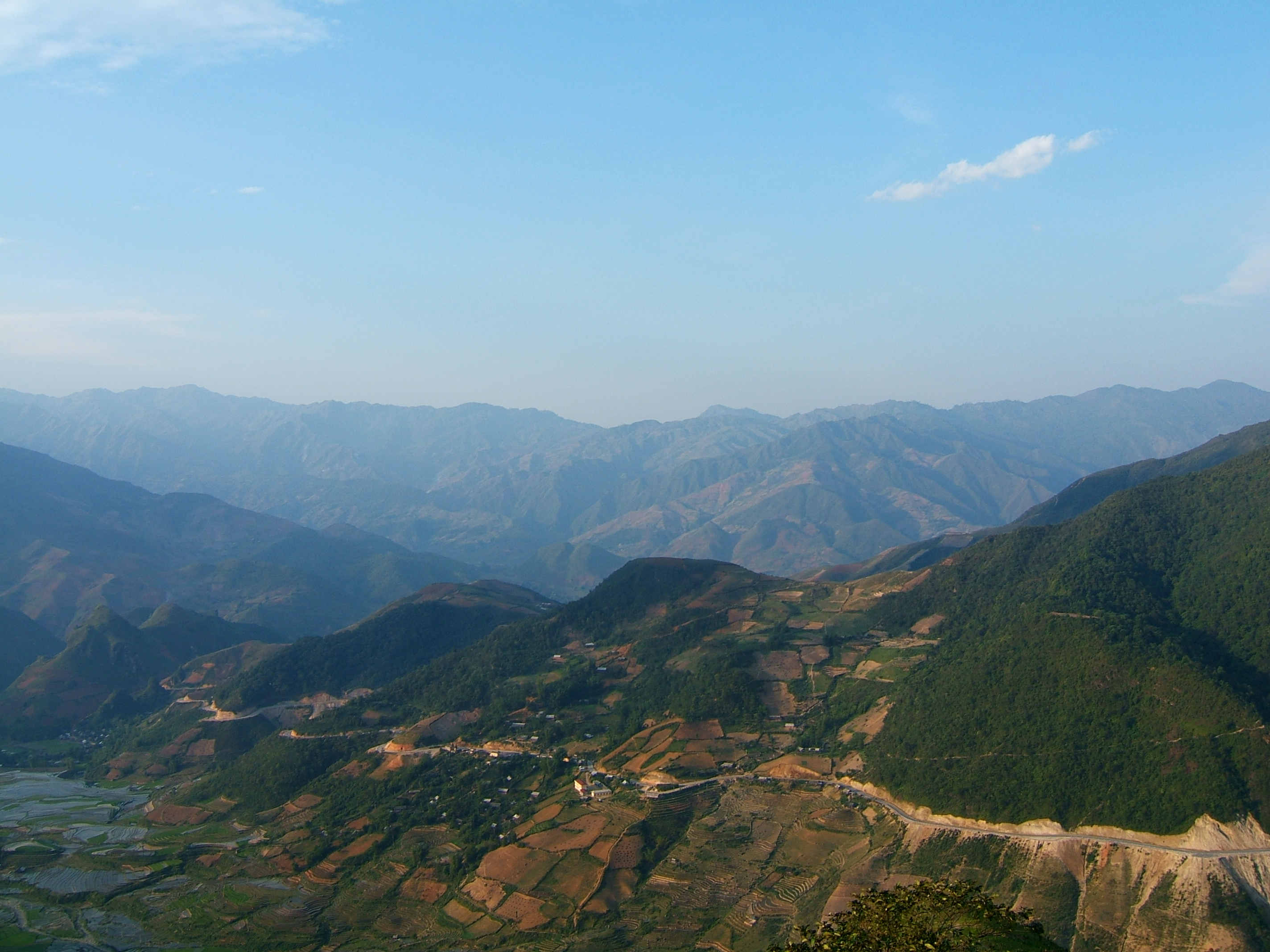
Khau Phạ Pass in National Highway No.32 in Mù Cang Chải District

The topography is steep, rising from east to west and from south to north. The average elevation is about 600 metres (2,000 ft) above sea level and can be divided into two regions: low-lying regions on the left bank of the Red River basin and the high right bank of the Red River and in the plateau between the Red River and Đà River there are multiple mountains. Besides the two main rivers, the Red and the Đà, the province has about 200 canals, small streams and large lakes and swamps. Thác Bà Lake is situated in the province, an artificial lake which has an area of 23,400 hectares (90 sq mi) and 1,331 islands and hills. It has a capacity of 3 to 3.9 billion cubic meters of water and its original intention was to run the Thác Bà hydroelectric plant, one of the first large hydropower projects in Vietnam. The water in the lake is clear, and reflects the surrounding green forests. The hills and islands have multiple caves, including Hum, Cau Cuoi and Bach Xa. A Thác Bà Temple is located in the lake area. Thác Bà Lake has changed the climatic pattern in the western districts of the province, to a moderate condition from its hot and dry status.

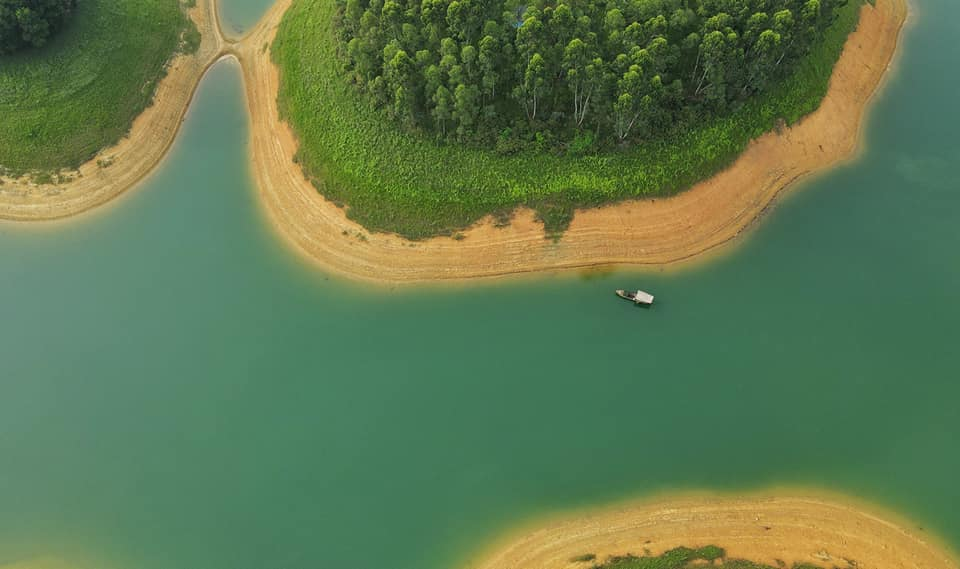
Thác Bà Lake with blue and clear color.

The main biomes of the province are rainforest, subtropical and temperate mountainous zones. It experiences a tropical monsoon season. The 20,293 hectares (78.35 sq mi) conservation area Mu Cang Chai Species / Habitat Conservation Area (MCC SHCA) was established in 2004 to protect the endangered mountain wildlife in Cang Chai district on the border of Lào Cai province.

The mean temperature in the province at elevations above 1500m is about 20 °C (68 °F) and drops to 0 °C (32 °F) with frost and snow in some parts. December–January are winter months when the climate is dry. Frequent drizzle is experienced during late winter months; this type of rain has earned Yên Bái the epithet "drizzle centre of the country". April to December are summer months and the rainy period. The mean temperature is stable for the district as a whole and is in the range of 18 °C (64 °F) to 28 °C (82 °F).

== Archaeological findings ==
Many archaeological findings have been unearthed in the provinces in places, which date human settlement between hoary 8000 years to the recent 2000 years; these have been preserved in the Archaeological Museum in Yên Bái City. The archaeological antiquaries found are; a large cylindrical jar in Dao Thinh Commune depicting scene of human cohabitation, a skeleton of an ancient Viet and another bronze jar containing the remnants of a six-year-old girl in Hum Cave in Luc Yen.

== Administrative divisions ==
Yên Bái is subdivided into 9 district-level sub-divisions and 173 commune-level sub-divisions:

Administrative divisions of Yên Bái

| Name | Population | Commune-level sub-divisions |
|---|---|---|
City (1)
| Yên Bái | 125,000 | 9 wards, 6 communes |
District-level town (1)
| Nghĩa Lộ | 68,206 | 4 wards, 10 communes |
Districts (7)
| Lục Yên District | 102,946 | 1 town, 23 communes |

| Name | Population | Commune-level sub-divisions |
|---|---|---|
| Mù Cang Chải District | 60,740 | 1 town, 13 communes |
| Trạm Tấu District | 27,030 | 1 town, 11 communes |
| Trấn Yên District | 90,260 | 1 town, 20 communes |
| Văn Chấn District | 116,804 | 3 towns, 21 communes |
| Văn Yên District | 107,810 | 1 town, 24 communes |
| Yên Bình District | 115,000 | 2 towns, 22 communes |

== Economy ==
The total area of the province is 689,900 hectares (6,899 km^{2}), out of which the agricultural area is 78,600 hectares (786 km^{2}), forest land forms major part of 453,600 hectares (4,536 km^{2}), homestead land accounts for 4,000 hectares (40 km^{2}) and land used for special purposes is 30,200 hectares (302 km^{2}). The per capita production of cereals in 2008 was 289 kg.

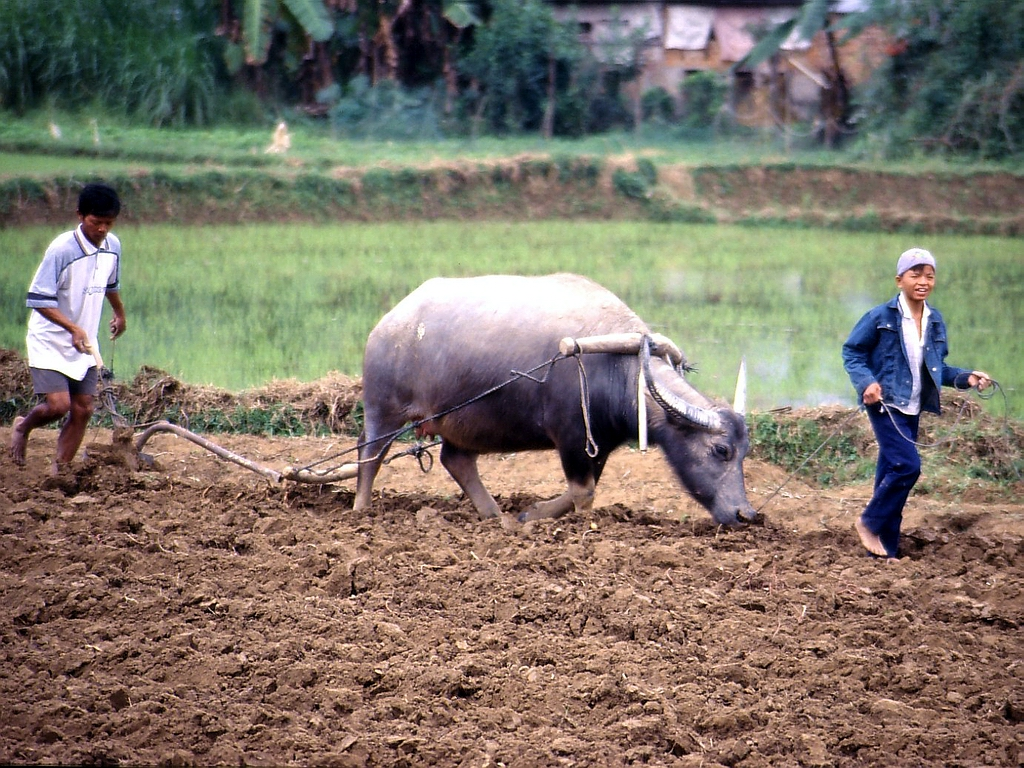
Rice farming in Vietnam

Yên Bái is home to 281 cooperatives, which are considered an effective way of generating employment to thousands of workers. These cooperatives are engaged in fields such as agricultural services, industrial services, construction, commerce, transportation, People's Credit Funds and health care. Cooperatives services include the production of black tea (manufacturing and processing), farm and forestry, fertilizers, transportation, electric supply in rural areas, and so forth.

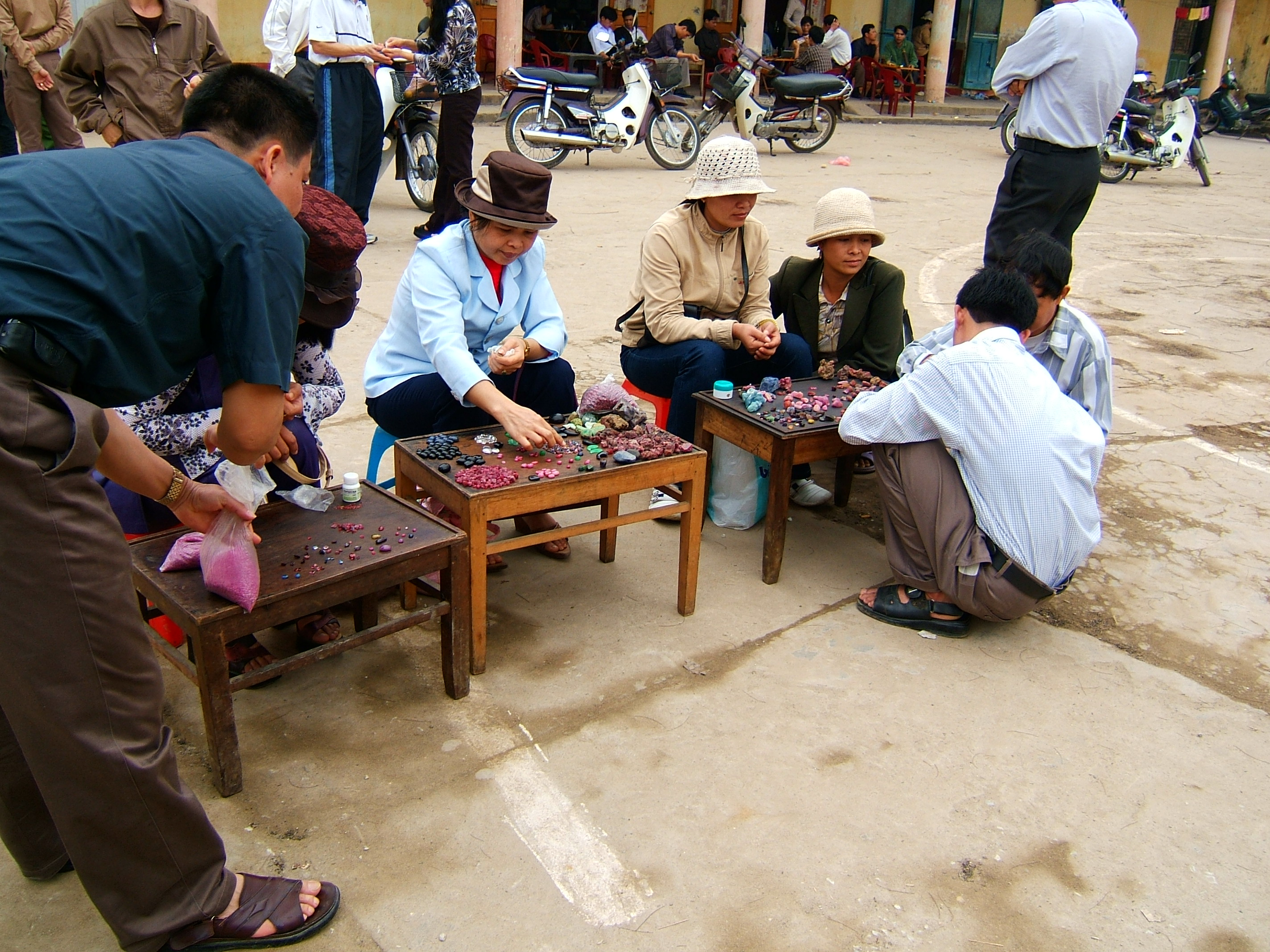
Gem market in Lục Yên District, Yên Bái province

A survey of the economic situation in Yên Bái carried out in 2006 indicated that living standards had increased substantially. For the period 1990 to 2004, Gross domestic product (GDP) tripled with an average increase of 7.5% per year. Poverty index decreased from 58% in 1993 to 16% in 2006 (as per General Statistics Office, 2006). However, underemployment, unstable income, inadequate childcare, limited access to health, child labour, social issues related to old people and social evils, gender inequality needed to addressed.

=== Farming ===
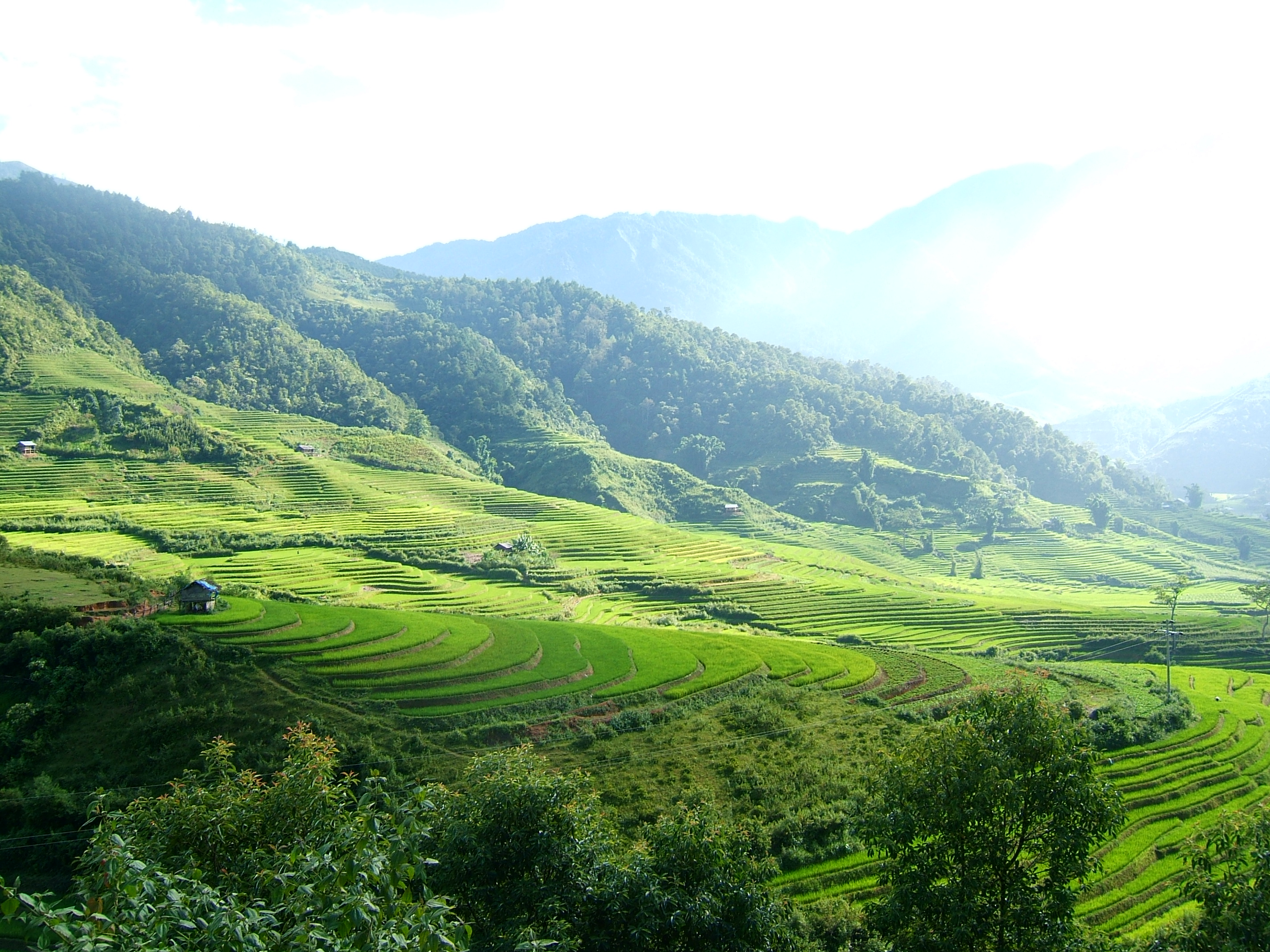
Rice fields in Trạm Tấu District

Farming, in particular, has been adopted as an important means for the acceleration of socio-economic development in rural areas. A reorganization of farming economy is planned through the establishment of centralized commodities production zones to enhance rural income, value of the land and levels of farming household income through agricultural extension services. In terms of agricultural products, main crops in the province include tea, cinnamon, glutinous rice, grapefruit, orange, taro and fish. About 700 farms are reportedly engaged in growing trees for pulp production, tea, cinnamon trees, breeding poultry, cattle and pigs.

In the mountainous northern region, non-timber forest products in an area of 5,000,000 hectares (50,000 km^{2}) are planned under a reforestation program, which includes about 40,000 hectares (400 km^{2}) under cinnamon; 15,000 hectares (150 km^{2}) have been developed.

Farming extension services

The Centre for Agricultural and Forestry Extension offices of the Yên Bái province takes care of agricultural and forestry extension work in more than 1,000 villages in 180 communes and precincts in the province. For this purpose a strong agricultural extension system from the provincial to grassroots levels has been established. The dissemination work carried out by the Extension Offices have involved: knowledge transfer of technological advances; shifting in the structure of plants, animals and crops; intensive farming of hybrid rice strains; changing one-crop rice fields to two-crop ones; cultivation on sloping soil; raising high-quality chickens and so forth.

25 key agricultural extension programmes have been developed to meet different growing periods in different terrains namely low lying and mountainous land. Further, more than 50 planting and husbandry models have been adopted envisaging new farming methods, centred on developing food, industrial plants and stock breeding for trading. Intensive farming of winter maize on two-rice-crop fields, intensive farming of hybrid rice strains in mountainous district of Mu Cang Chai, planting high-quality rice, sugar cane, coffee strains, raising chickens, planting forests have also been adopted by the farmers

=== Mining ===
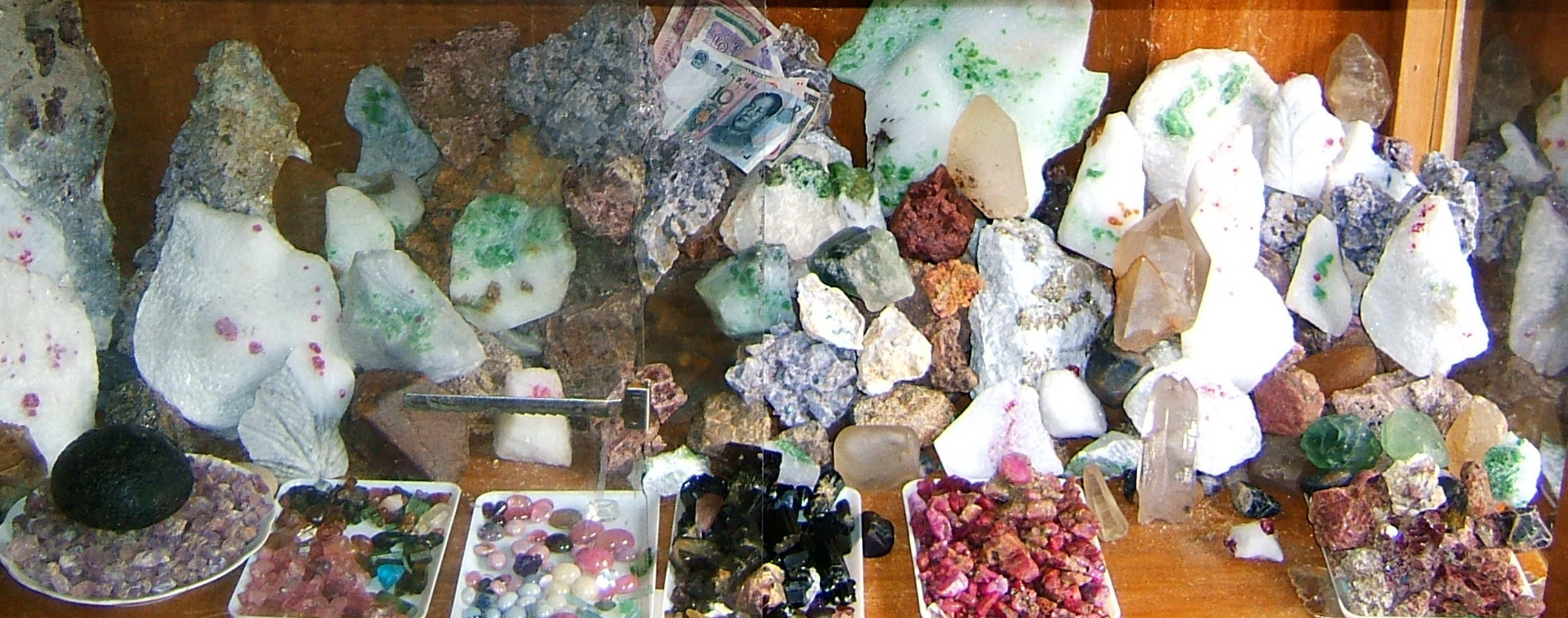
Gemstones

In all, 33 ores and minerals are currently mined in the multiple quarries in Lục Yên District, out of which 23 are valid minerals, including gemstones. Among these ores and minerals are: apatite, biotite, calcite, chlorite group, chondrodite, corundum, danburite, elbaite, fluor-cannilloite, graphite, humite, lepidolite, varieties of microcline such as amazonite, muscovite, olivine, orthoclase, paragonite, pargasite, phlogopite, pyrite, quartz and smoky quartz, rossmanite, rutile, schorl, spinel, titanite and tourmaline; gemstones such as rubies, spinel, and tourmaline. Lục Yên is particularly famous for its rubies.

=== Water resources ===
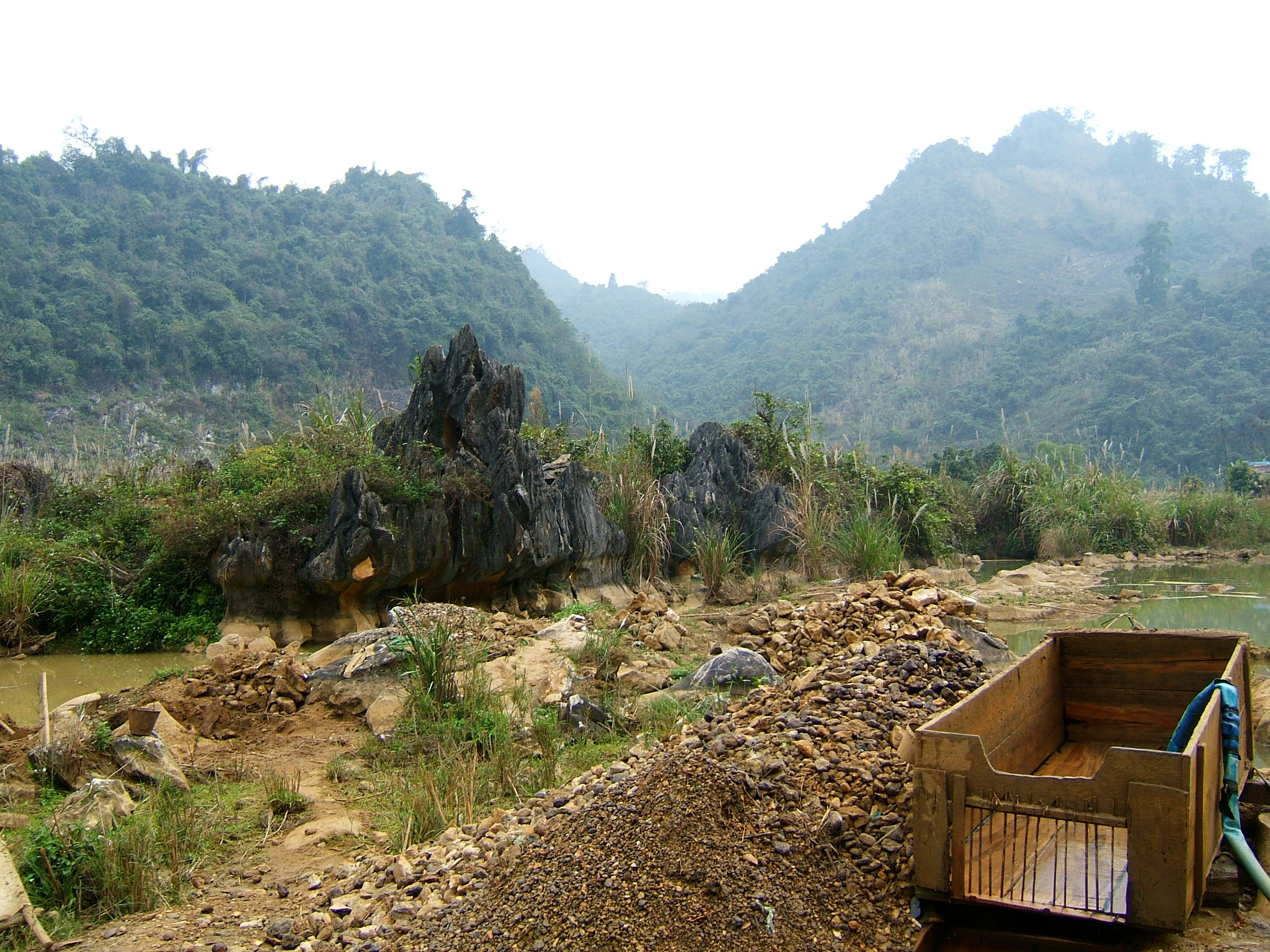
Gem mines in Lục Yên District, Yên Bái province

The Chay River, the second largest tributary of the Lo River, which in turn joins the Mekong River, rises from the Tay Con Linh mountain range (in Vietnam) at a height of 2,419 metres (7,936 ft). After flowing towards the west, it flows further southeast in the middle and lower reaches, at which point it joins the Lô River at Đoan Hùng. The basin is delimited by high mountain ranges—in the north by ranges of 1,500 metres (4,900 ft) to 2,000 metres (6,600 ft) in height, on the west by the Con Voi mountain range and on the east and south east by the Tay Con Linh range. The width of the river is wide in its upper reaches and "tapers to an elongated shape in the middle and lower reaches". The basin has an area of 6500 km^{2} (1620 km^{2} in China) with 60% area below an elevation of 400 m (average elevation of the basin is 858 m). The annual rainfall in the basin varies from 1,500 mm to 3,000 mm with rains concentrated (75–85%) during May to October.

Water from the Chay River that flows through the Yên Bái district has been tapped for hydropower generation, irrigation water supply in the downstream area, aquaculture and river navigation.

==== Thác Bà Hydropower Plant ====
The Thác Bà Hydropower Plant is a major hydropower project located within the province on the Chay River, built between 1964 and 1971 with assistance from the Soviet Union. Construction began on August 19, 1964. Despite frequent air strikes by the United States Air Force during this period, the first unit of the power plant was commissioned on October 5, 1971; the second unit followed in August 1972, and the third unit on May 19, 1972. The power plant currently has a capacity of 120 MW, and has an energy generating potential of 400 million kWh/year. The project as built has a dam 48 m high and 657 m long, creating a gross storage capacity of 2.49 cubic kilometres with a live storage of 2.16 cubic kilometres on the Chay River draining a catchment of 6430 km^{2} at the dam site. The reservoir is 60 km with a water spread of 235 km^{2} at the Full Reservoir Level of +58 m. The project has been designed for a maximum flood discharge of 3,650 m^{3}/s. The other ruling levels of the project are: dead storage level in the reservoir +46.0m and maximum flood level of +59.65 for a thousand-year flood.

Every year, the Yên Bái Provincial People's Committee arrange the Thác Bà Discovery Festival, supported by Lào Cai, Phú Thọ and Yên Bái provinces. It is held in the vicinity of the Thác Bà Hydroelectric Power Plant. Participants in the festival typically visit the lake and take part in a boat race that is held there. A village festival showcasing ethnic minorities, a trade fair, a costume show, sports and traditional art competitions are also held.

Thác Bà Lake

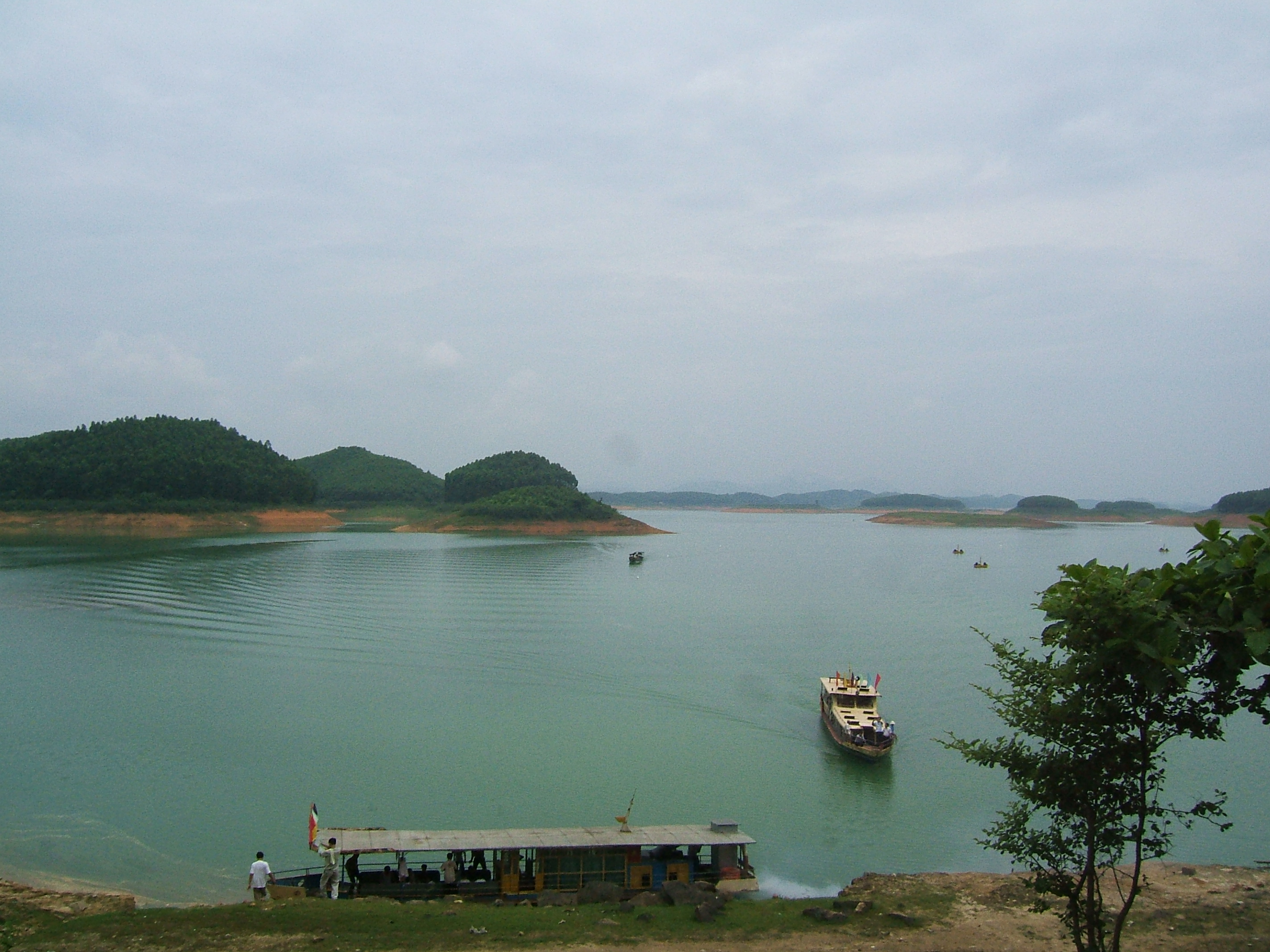
Thác Bà Lake

The water resource development of the province is thus centred on artificial Thác Bà Lake, which was created for hydropower development. The lake has an area of 23,400 hectares (234 km^{2}) and has 1,331 islands. The hill catchment has a varied ecology; an interesting feature in the catchment with its beautiful landscape is thousands of hills and islands which have caves like the Hum, Cau Cuoi and Bach Xa. There is also a temple on the banks of lake known as Thác Bà Temple. The site that the lake now lies in was the historic scene in 1285 AD during the Thu Vat Battle that took place under the command of Trần Nhật Duật against Mongolian invaders. Thác Bà Lake is now an ecological tourist centre with entertainment, mountain climbing and hiking facilities. The Mong Son Grotto, which housed the Yên Bái Party Committee during the anti-American resistance is located at the centre of this lake.

=== Transport ===
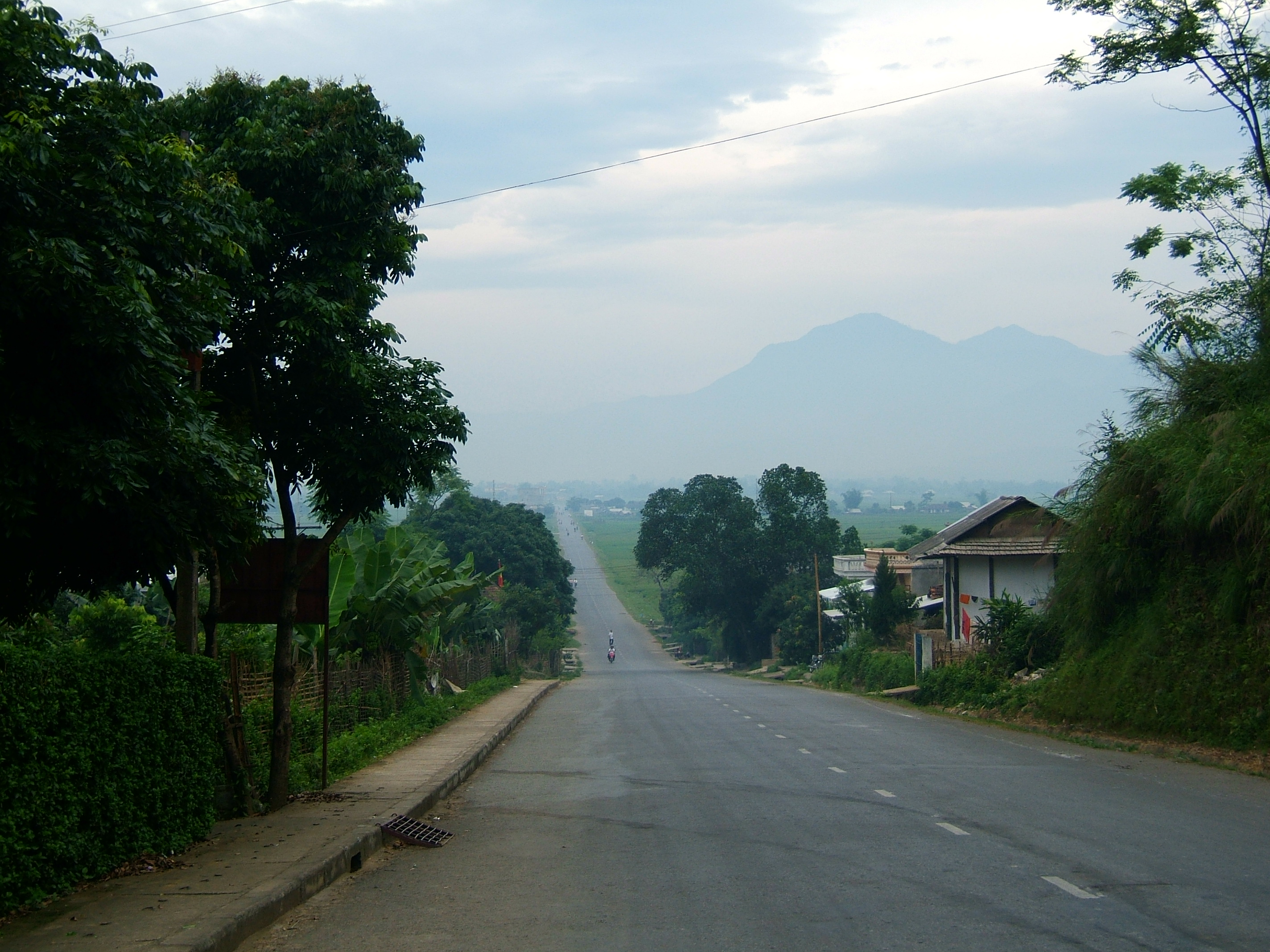
A main road near Nghĩa Lộ

The Yên Bái city is an important transport hub of Northern Vietnam.

Railways

Yên Bái lies on the railway that runs northwest from the capital and largest city in the north of the country, Hanoi, to the border town of Lào Cai and into Yunnan in China. The railway also passes through the towns of Mau A and Co Phuc. The railway has been a major freight corridor between China and Vietnam since its construction, and runs approximately along the Red River. National Route 70 is the highway that goes from Lào Cai southeast into Yên Bái province, through Yên Bình just north of the town of Yên Bái, and joins up with National Road 2—which leads to Hanoi—at Đoan Hùng.

Roads

Running parallel to and a few kilometres to the southwest of National Road 70 is National Road 32, which goes from Hanoi northwest to the town of Yên Bái through Sơn Tây, Lâm Thao and Phú Thọ province. National Road 37 connects the town of Yên Bái to Nong Truong Tran Phu to the south. The latter town is also serviced by National Road 32, which takes a northwesterly direction through Nghĩa Lộ, Nong Truong Lien Son into the mountainous northwest of the province and into neighbouring Lào Cai province. The province lies about 183 km away on the 340 km Lào Cai to Ha Noi road.

Air

Yên Bái Airbase (ICAO: VVYB) is located about 5 km north of downtown Yên Bái. It is currently used as a training facility for fighter pilots serving in the Vietnam People's Air Force.

== Culture and festivals ==
Dong Cuong and Dai Cai are two temples in the province. Dai Cai Temple has been built amidst a large lush green is approached from riverside roads. Excavations by Archaeologist have found relics of Son Vi culture in the Dong Cuong Temple area.

=== Festivals ===
Many festivals are celebrated in the province, as decided by an Organising Board. Some of the important festivals are:

Dong Cuong temple festival

Dong Cuong Temple Festival is held in the Dong Cuong commune, Van Yen district, where the temple is located. The festival rites performed present an array of events starting with an invitation to the living and the dead, royal offerings, a procession of the palanquins of the Tutelary God and Holy Mother. The festival features traditional cultural and sport activities such as xoe dance, con throwing, en playing and traditional opera singing.

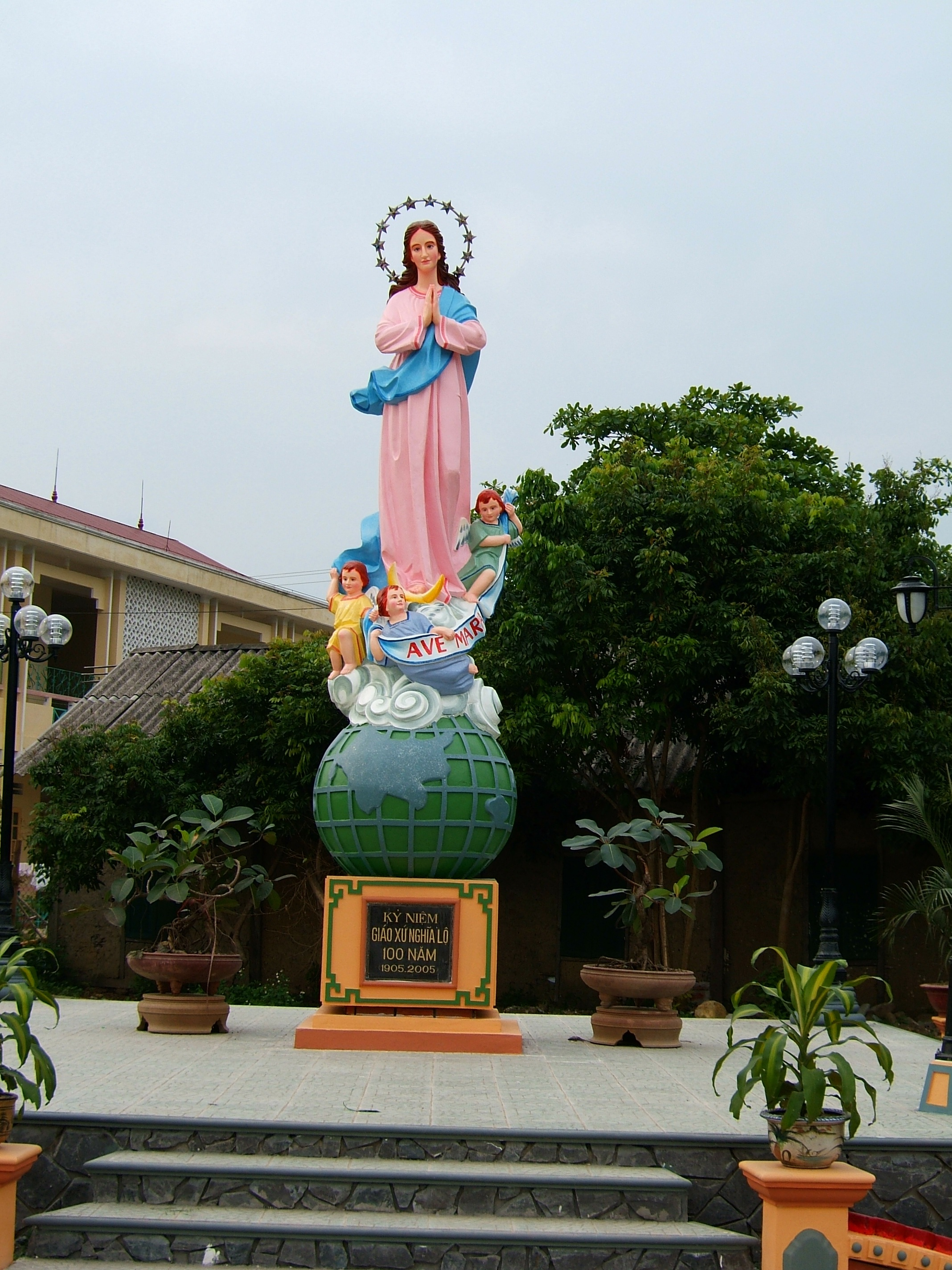
A monument in Nghĩa Lộ

Muong Lo cultural week

The Muong Lo Cultural Week held in the month of October in Nghia Lo town marks the anniversary of the liberation of Nghia Lo. Festivities lasting one week include sports competitions, Tây Bắc (North West) Fair and a food and drink competition.

Suoi Giang panpines festival

The Suoi Giang Panpines Festival held in June in Suoi Giang commune, Van Chan district, features dances, visit to Suoi Giang tea tree followed by a tea ceremony of the Mong ethnic minority people. Visits to traditional cultural villages and to Tap Plang Waterfall are also part of the programme.

Grapefruit flower festival

The Grapefruit flower festival is held in September at Kha Linh communal house, Dai Minh commune, Yên Bình District, featuring the Kha Linh Communal House, grapefruit flower offerings, community tours to the Ngoi Tu cultural village and traditional sports.

Nam Cuong Temple Festival

The Nam Cuong Temple Festival is held sometime in March in Nam Cường commune, Yên Bái city, when pigeons are released by the villagers seeking peace; boat race in Nam Cuong lake and a tug-of-war competition are also part of the festival.

Mong ethnic cultural festival

Prosperity to the local the Hmong people centred on an ancient tea tree in Suot Giang in this province. The tree gradually helped them to raise their standard of living. To commemorate this tree, the Hmong ethnic cultural festival is held to glorify the value of this tree. During the festival, a ritual is done at the ancient tree by the head of the village as a symbolic representation of the history and culture of the land. Khen dancing, Pao throwing and the tug of war and other cultural events are also held, as part of this festival.

Other places of interest to visit are the Mu Cang Chai species and bio-landscape reserve, the western region of white Bauhilia flower and the Giang Spring.

== Gallery ==
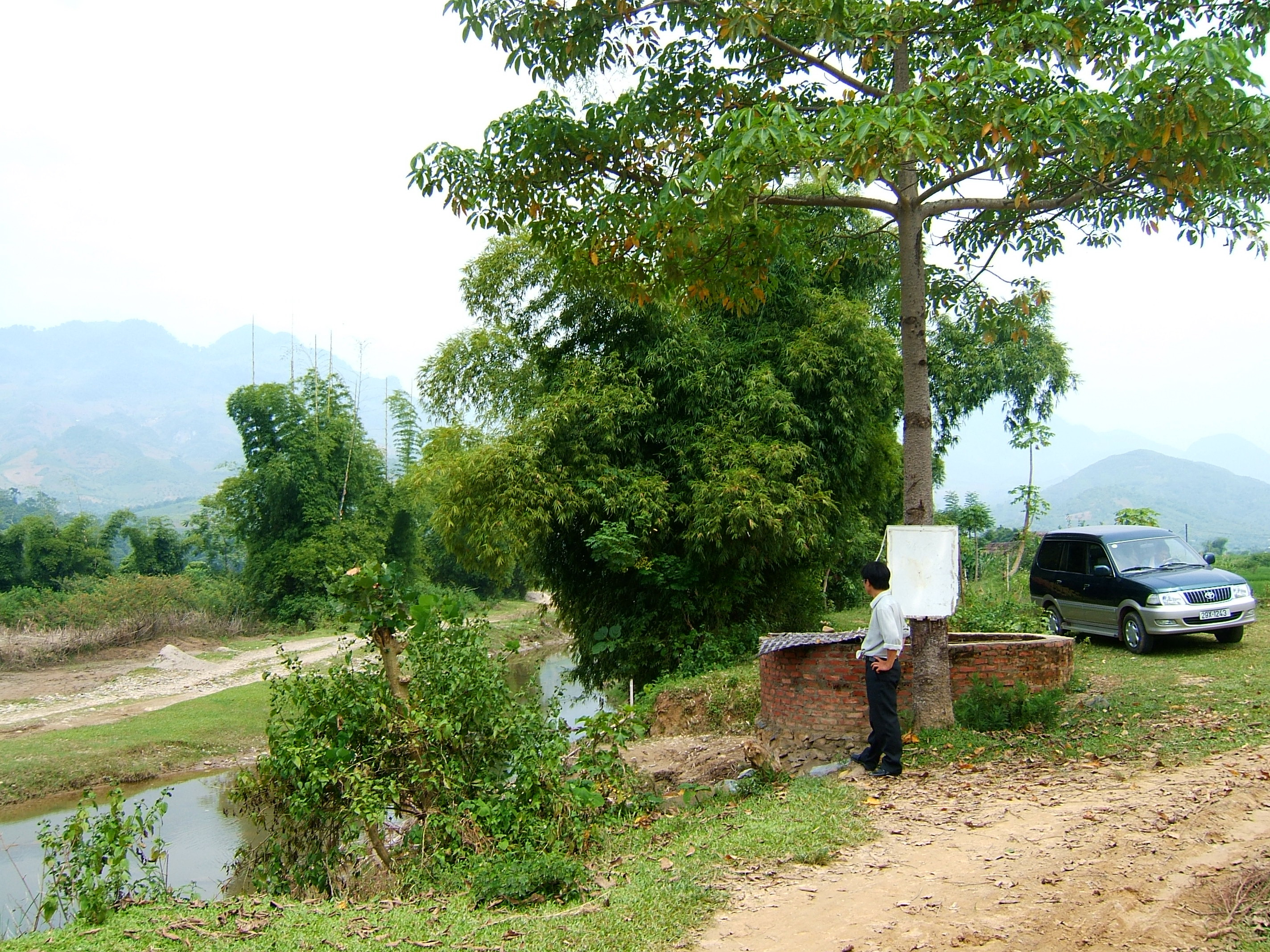
Suoi Khoang, Văn Chấn District

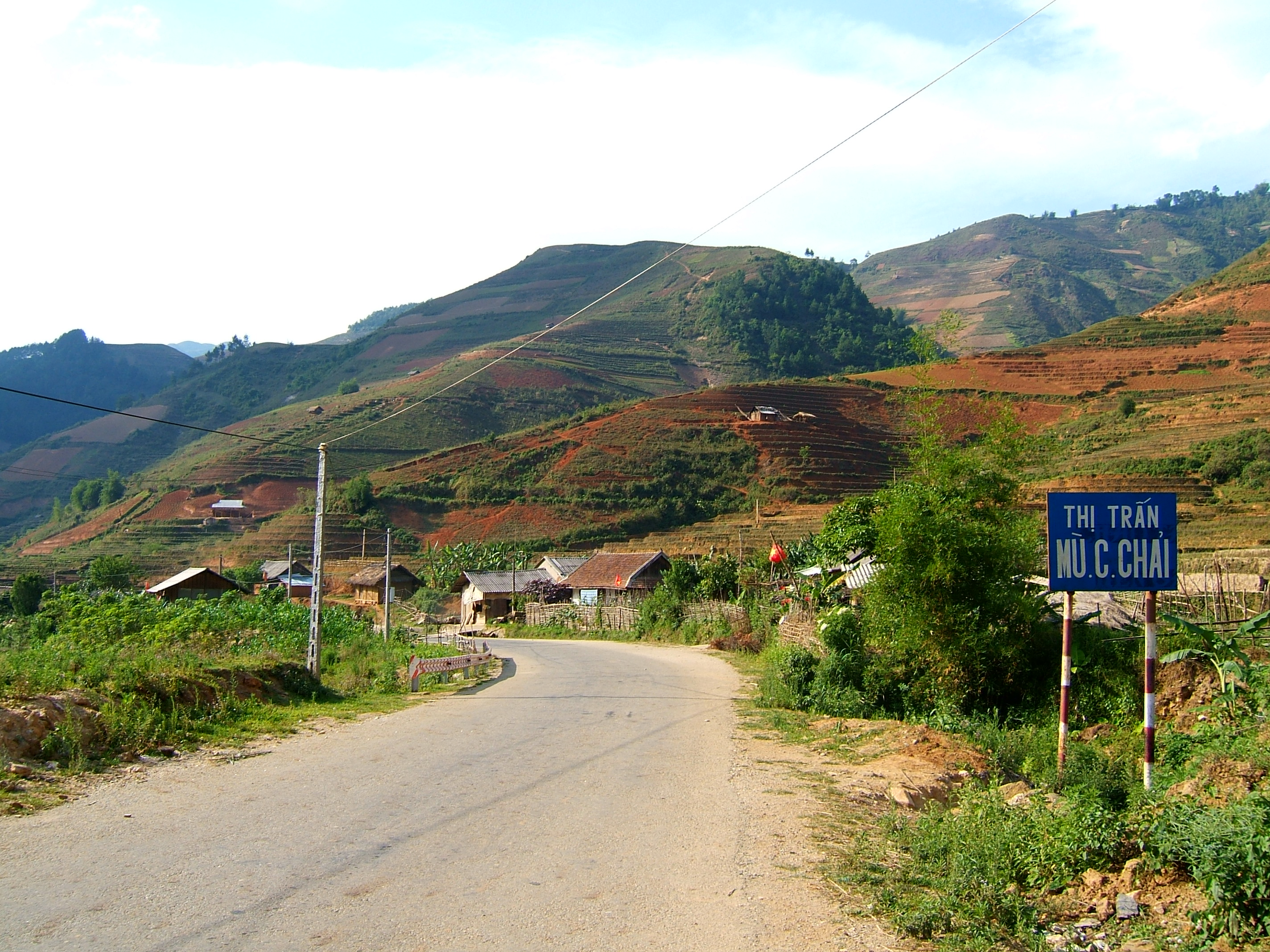
Mu Cang Chai town

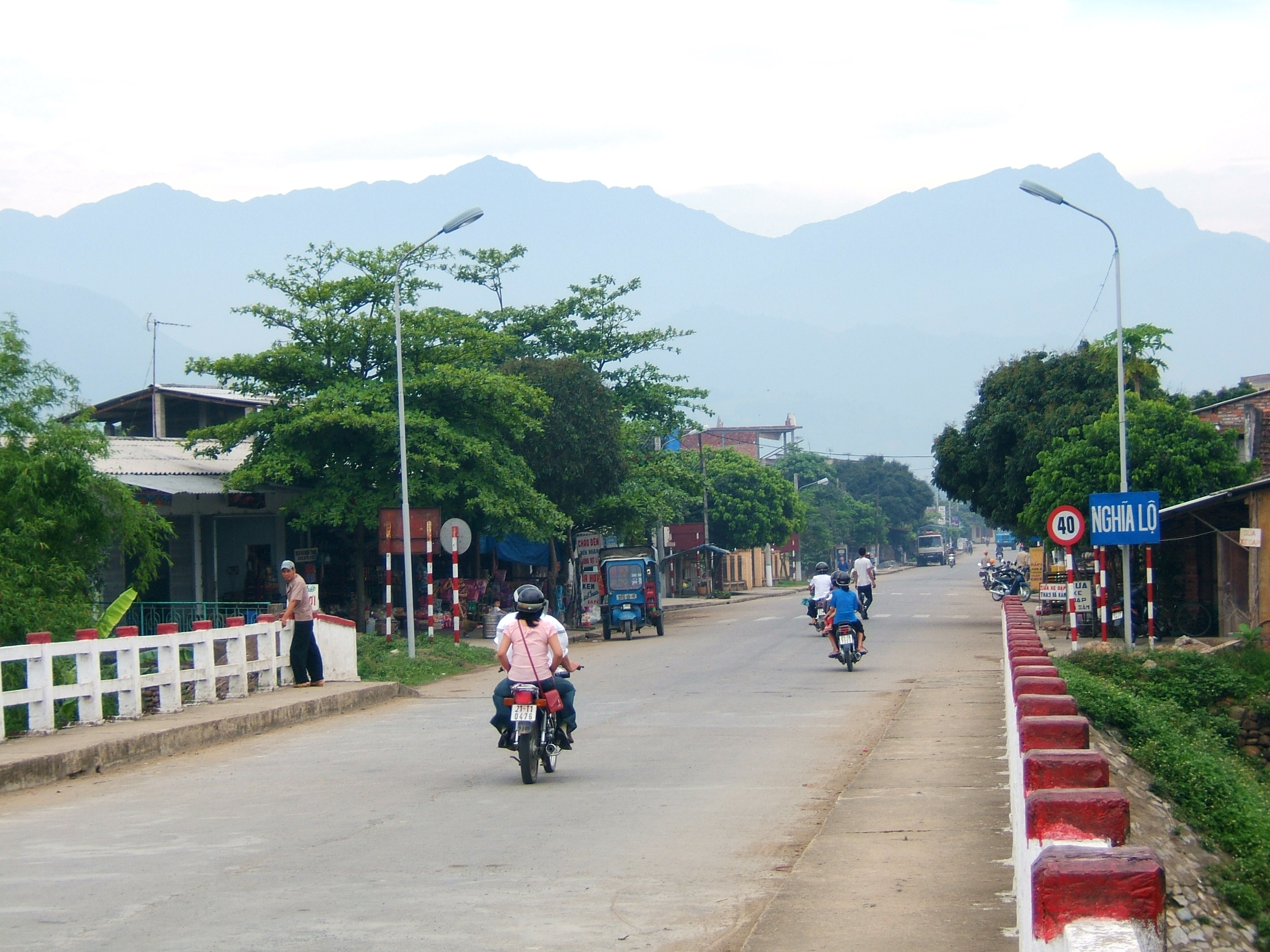
Nghĩa Lộ

== Bibliography ==
- Currey, Cecil B. (1999). Victory at Any Cost: the genius of Viet Nam's Gen. Vo Nguyen Giap. Brassey. ISBN 1-57488-194-9.
- Rives, Maurice (1999). Les Linh Tap – Histoire des militaires indochinois au service de la France (in French). Editions La Vauzelle. ISBN 2-7025-0436-1.
- Duiker, William (1976). The Rise of Nationalism in Vietnam, 1900–1941. Ithaca, New York: Cornell University. ISBN 0-8014-0951-9.
- Hammer, Ellen J. (1955). The Struggle for Indochina, 1940–1955. Stanford, California: Stanford University.
- Marr, David G. (1970). Vietnamese anticolonialism, 1885–1925. Berkeley, California: University of California Press. ISBN 0-520-01813-3.
- Lam, Tran Doan. Vietnamese Studies. Chairman of the Advisory Board.
