= Nghĩa Lộ =

Nghĩa Lộ may refer to:

- Nghĩa Lộ, Lào Cai, a ward of Lào Cai province, Vietnam
- Nghĩa Lộ, Quảng Ngãi, a ward of Quảng Ngãi province
- Nghĩa Lộ (town), a former district-level town of Yên Bái province
