= Yên Bình district =

Yên Bình district Huyện Yên Bình
- District
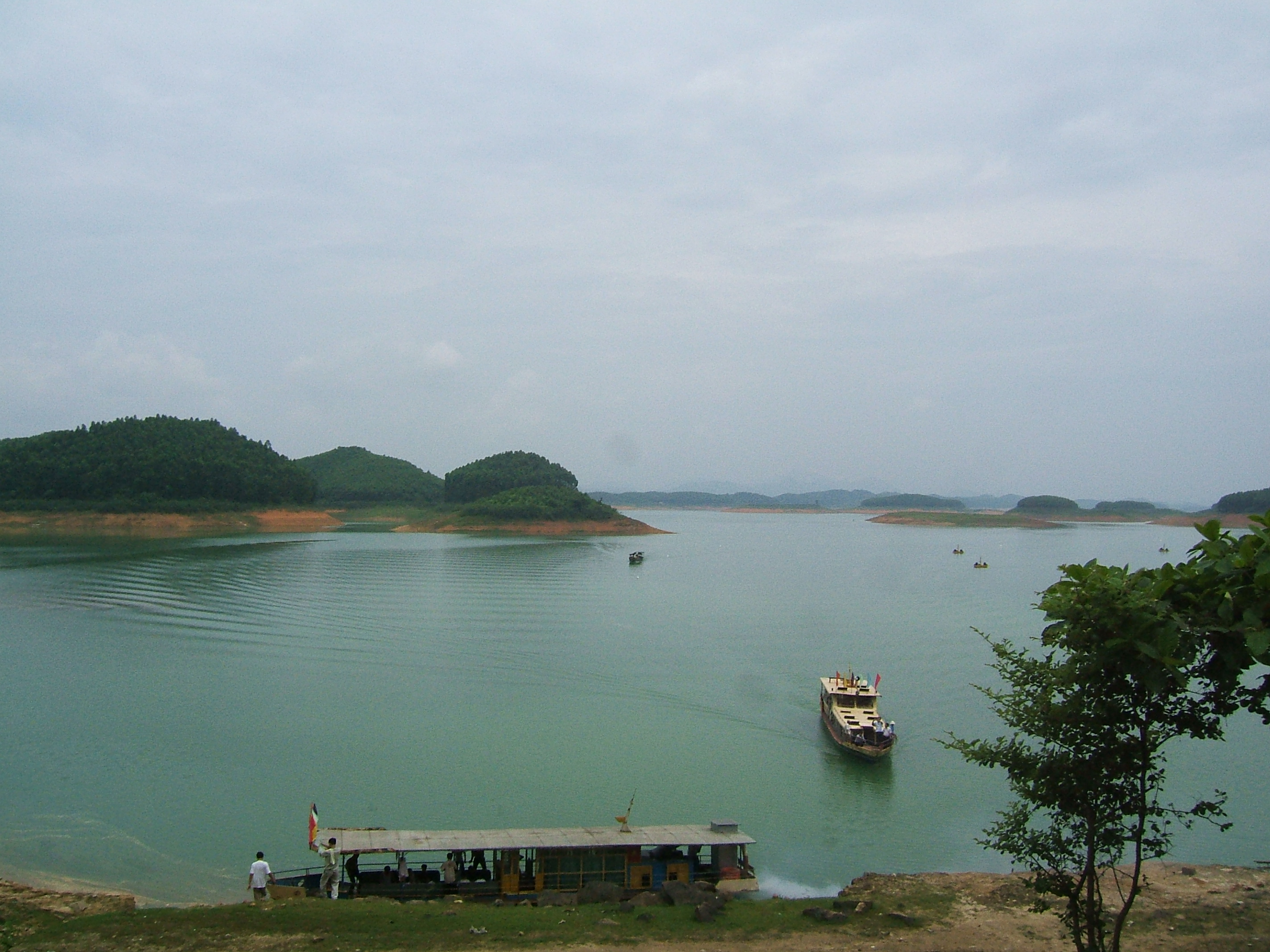
- Thác Bà Lake

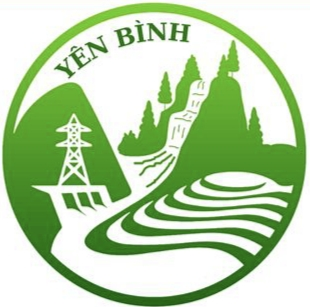
- Seal
- Interactive map of Yên Bình district
- Country: Vietnam
- Region: Northeast
- Province: Yên Bái
- Capital: Yên Bình
- Subdivision: 2 townships and 22 rural communes

Government
  - Type: District

Area
  - Total: 773.20 km^{2} (298.53 sq mi)

Population (2019)
  - Total: 112,046
  - Density: 144.91/km^{2} (375.32/sq mi)
- Time zone: UTC+7 (UTC + 7)
- Website: yenbinh.yenbai.gov.vn

Yên Bình is a former rural district of Yên Bái province, in the Northeast region of Vietnam. As of 2019, the district had a population of 112,046. The district covers an area of 773.20 km^{2}.

== Administrative divisions ==
Yên Bình is divided into 24 commune-level sub-divisions, including 2 townships (Yên Bình, Thác Bà) and 22 rural communes (Bạch Hà, Bảo Ái, Cảm Ân, Cảm Nhân, Đại Đồng, Đại Minh, Hán Đà, Mông Sơn, Mỹ Gia, Ngọc Chấn, Phú Thịnh, Phúc An, Phúc Ninh, Tân Hương, Tân Nguyên, Thịnh Hưng, Vĩnh Kiên, Vũ Linh, Xuân Lai, Xuân Long, Yên Bình, Yên Thành).
