= Thác Bà Reservoir =

- Thác Bà Lake
- Hồ Thác Bà (Vietnamese)
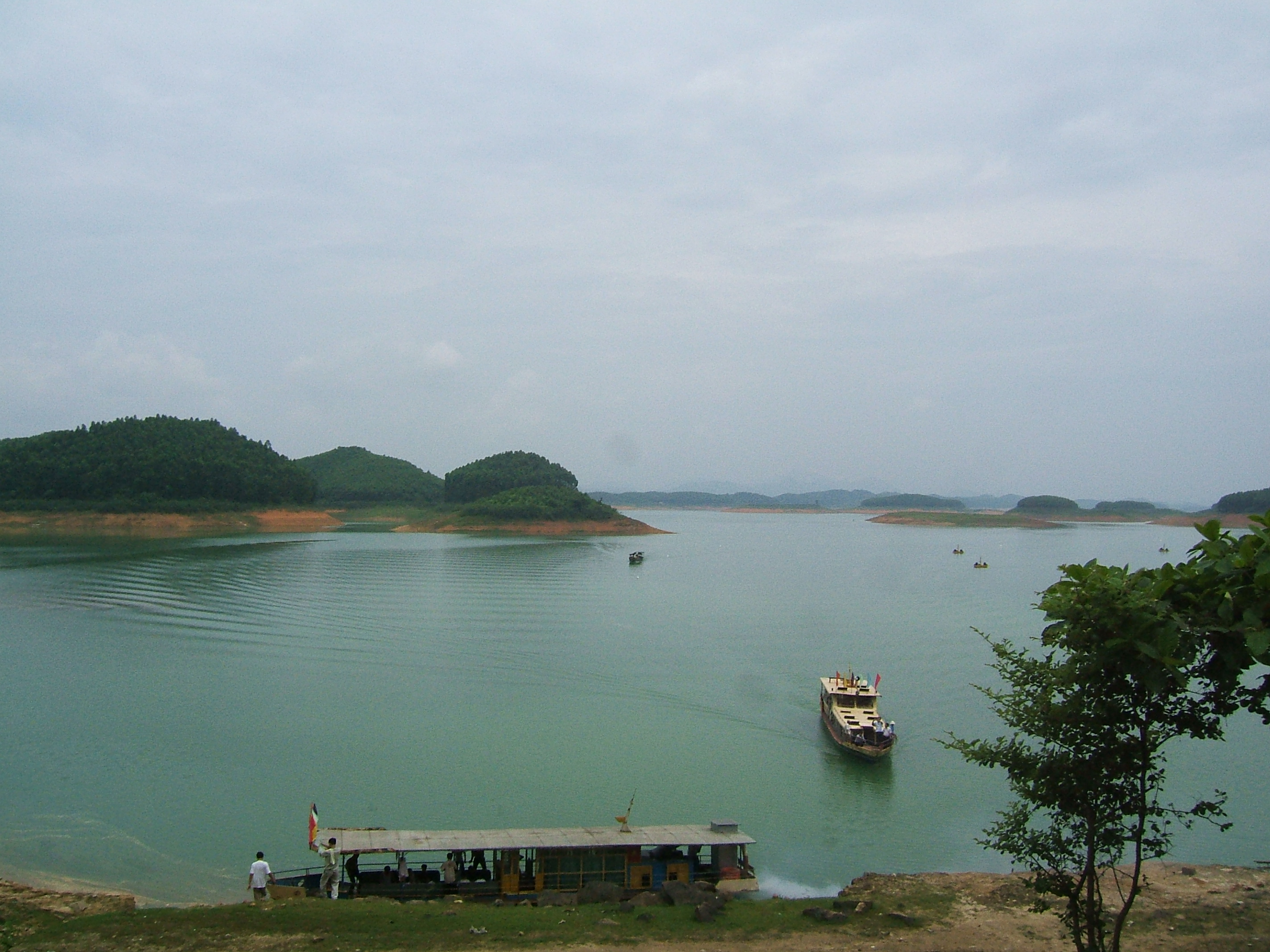
- Thác Bà Lake

- Location within Vietnam
- Location: Vietnam
- Coordinates: 21.728°N 105.0215°E
- Type: Reservoir
- River sources: Song Chay
- Surface area: 90.35 miles (145.40 km)

The Thác Bà Reservoir or Thác Bà Lake (Vietnamese: Hồ Thác Bà) is an artificial lake in Yên Bái Province, Vietnam created by construction of the Thác Bà hydroelectric plant in the 1960s. Thác Bà is the name of the Bà Falls which pre-existed the dam (cf. Vietnamese: thác nước, waterfall).

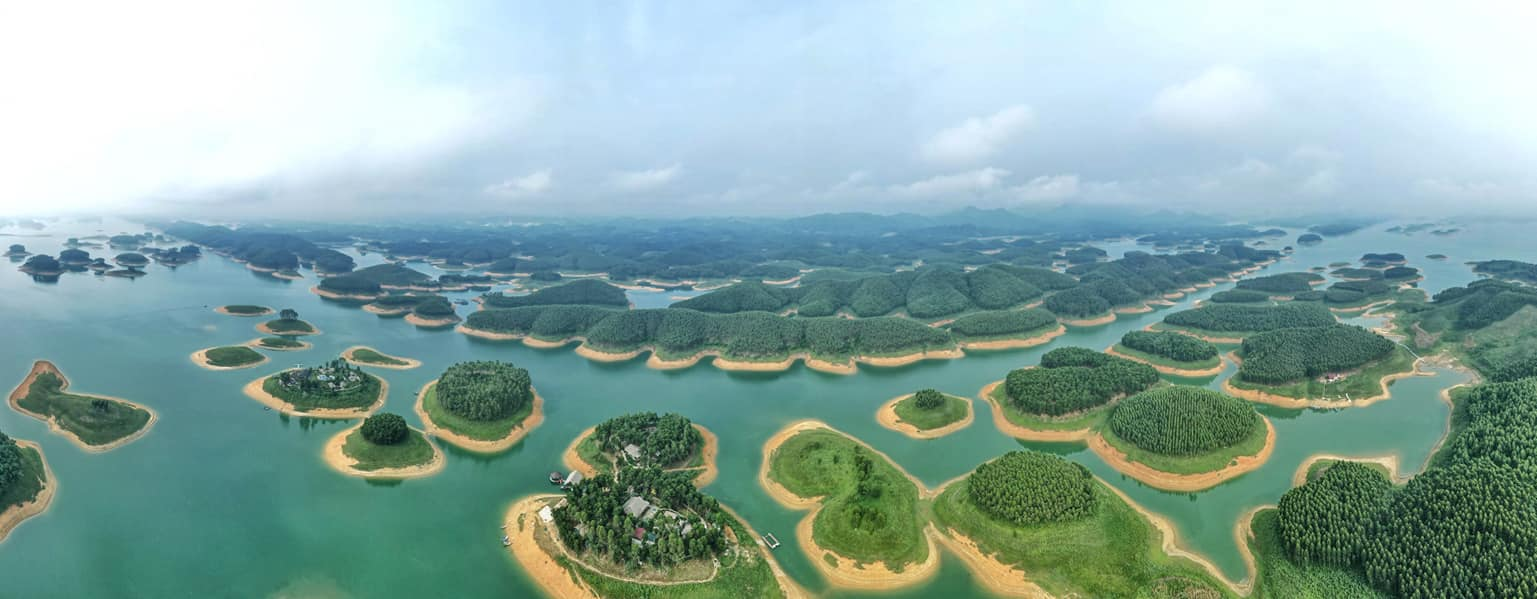
Panoramic view of Thác Bà lake
