= Phúc Sơn =

- Commune
- Interactive map of Phúc Sơn
- Coordinates: 20.780657314289737°N 105.70303612913239°E
- Country: Vietnam
- Region: Red River Delta
- Municipality: Hanoi
- Administrative headquarters: Mỹ Thành Center

Area
  - Total: 49.31 km^{2} (19.04 sq mi)

Population (2025)
  - Total: 54,084
  - Density: 1,096/km^{2} (2,840/sq mi)
- Website: phucson.hanoi.gov.vn

Phúc Sơn is a commune in the municipality of Hanoi, Vietnam.

On 16 June 2025, district-level administrative units nationwide ceased to operate.

On the same date, the Standing Committee of the National Assembly of Vietnam issued Resolution No. 1656/NQ-UBTVQH15 on the arrangement of commune-level administrative units in Hanoi in 2025. Under the resolution, the entire area and population of Mỹ Xuyên, Phúc Lâm, Thượng Lâm, and Tuy Lai communes, together with part of the area and the entire population of Đồng Tâm Commune, formerly part of Mỹ Đức district, were merged to form a new commune named Phúc Sơn.
