= Nghĩa Lộ (town) =

Former district-level town in the former Yên Bái province, Vietnam

- District-level town
- (Class-3)
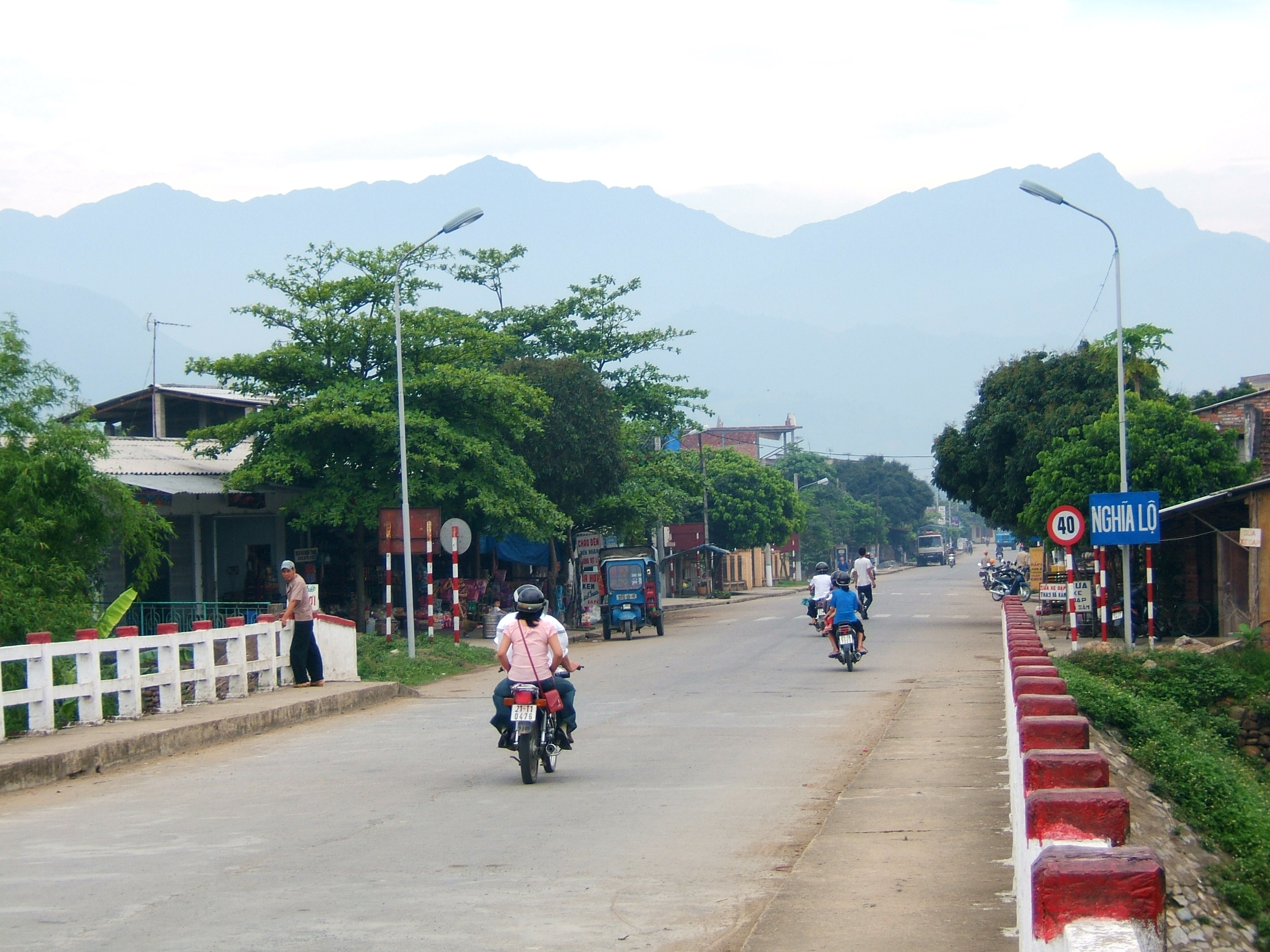

- Seal
- Interactive map of Nghĩa Lộ
- Location within Vietnam
- Coordinates: 21°34′33″N 104°31′9″E
- Country: Vietnam
- Region: north-east
- Province: Yên Bái
- Subdivision: 4 wards and 10 rural communes

Area
  - District-level town: 107.78 km^{2} (41.61 sq mi)
  - Urban: 11.28 km^{2} (4.36 sq mi)

Population (2020)
  - District-level town: 68,206
  - Density: 632.83/km^{2} (1,639.0/sq mi)
  - Urban: 22,253
  - Urban density: 1,973/km^{2} (5,109/sq mi)
- Time zone: UTC+7 (UTC + 7)
- Website: nghialo.yenbai.gov.vn

Nghĩa Lộ is a former district-level town in the former Yên Bái province, Vietnam. It is bordered by Văn Chấn district and Trạm Tấu district.

In 1951, the Viet Minh 312 Division fought French forces in the area as part of the First Indochina War.

As of 2020, the district had a population of 68,206. The district covers an area of 107.78 km^{2}.

== Administrative divisions ==
Nghĩa Lộ is divided into 14 commune-level sub-divisions, including 4 wards (Cầu Thia, Pú Trạng, Tân An, Trung Tâm) and 10 rural communes (Hạnh Sơn, Nghĩa An, Nghĩa Lộ, Nghĩa Lợi, Nghĩa Phúc, Phù Nham, Phúc Sơn, Sơn A, Thạch Lương, Thanh Lương).

== Climate ==
Climate data for Nghĩa Lộ/Văn Chấn district, elevation 257 m (843 ft)
Month	Jan	Feb	Mar	Apr	May	Jun	Jul	Aug	Sep	Oct	Nov	Dec	Year
Record high °C (°F)	33.5 (92.3)	35.7 (96.3)	37.9 (100.2)	39.0 (102.2)	41.2 (106.2)	40.0 (104.0)	39.3 (102.7)	38.0 (100.4)	37.0 (98.6)	38.2 (100.8)	34.5 (94.1)	31.5 (88.7)	41.2 (106.2)
Mean daily maximum °C (°F)	19.9 (67.8)	21.4 (70.5)	24.6 (76.3)	28.5 (83.3)	31.5 (88.7)	32.5 (90.5)	32.4 (90.3)	31.9 (89.4)	30.8 (87.4)	28.4 (83.1)	25.2 (77.4)	21.7 (71.1)	27.4 (81.3)
Daily mean °C (°F)	15.6 (60.1)	17.1 (62.8)	20.1 (68.2)	23.6 (74.5)	26.2 (79.2)	27.5 (81.5)	27.5 (81.5)	26.9 (80.4)	25.7 (78.3)	23.4 (74.1)	20.0 (68.0)	16.7 (62.1)	22.5 (72.5)
Mean daily minimum °C (°F)	13.1 (55.6)	14.7 (58.5)	17.5 (63.5)	20.8 (69.4)	23.0 (73.4)	24.3 (75.7)	24.6 (76.3)	24.0 (75.2)	22.7 (72.9)	20.5 (68.9)	16.9 (62.4)	13.8 (56.8)	19.6 (67.3)
Record low °C (°F)	0.8 (33.4)	5.3 (41.5)	1.4 (34.5)	9.5 (49.1)	15.8 (60.4)	15.9 (60.6)	18.1 (64.6)	19.6 (67.3)	15.3 (59.5)	9.6 (49.3)	5.5 (41.9)	2.0 (35.6)	0.8 (33.4)
Average precipitation mm (inches)	20.4 (0.80)	19.7 (0.78)	43.1 (1.70)	91.3 (3.59)	151.3 (5.96)	212.6 (8.37)	229.6 (9.04)	306.0 (12.05)	232.8 (9.17)	138.9 (5.47)	40.2 (1.58)	18.7 (0.74)	1,509 (59.41)
Average rainy days	6.0	7.4	9.3	13.9	15.9	16.7	17.5	19.0	14.5	11.6	6.9	4.4	143.3
Average relative humidity (%)	83.3	83.2	83.1	83.7	82.8	83.0	84.1	85.8	85.6	84.8	83.6	82.7	83.8
Mean monthly sunshine hours	82.8	81.4	106.0	137.5	166.6	141.8	159.5	158.4	147.9	129.0	119.1	108.4	1,533.3
Source: Vietnam Institute for Building Science and Technology
