= Yên Bái =

Ward and capital of Lào Cai province, Vietnam

- Ward
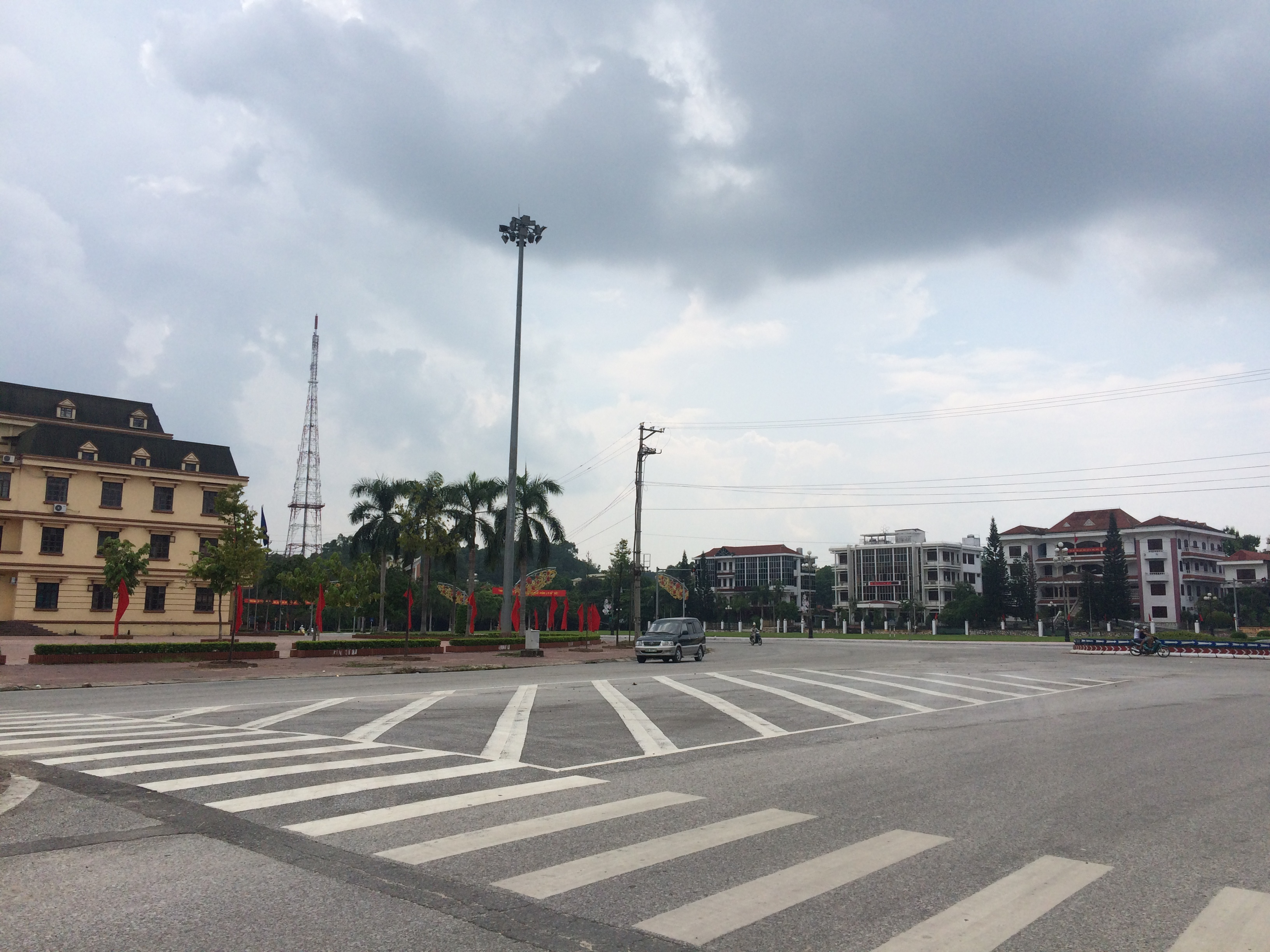
- A view in Yên Bái ward
- Interactive map of Yên Bái
- Coordinates: 21°42′36″N 104°53′12″E
- Country: Vietnam
- Province: Lào Cai
- Establishment: 16 June 2025

Government
  - Chairman of the People's Committee: Phùng Tiến Thanh
  - Party Committee's Secretary: Đoàn Hữu Phung

Area
  - Total: 16.95 km^{2} (6.54 sq mi)

Population
  - Total: 70,391
  - Density: 4,153/km^{2} (10,760/sq mi)

Yên Bái; is a ward in Lào Cai province, Vietnam. This is the administrative center of Lào Cai province and it is one of 99 wards and communes in the province.

It is currently serving as the provincial capital, housing the headquarters of the Provincial Party Committee, the Provincial People's Committee and Council, and the provincial branch of the Vietnamese Fatherland Front of Lào Cai province.

The arrangement follows after the merger of Lào Cai and Yên Bái provinces according to the 2024–2025 national reorganisation plan.

== History ==
On 16 June 2025, the Standing Committee of the National Assembly issued resolution No. 1673/NQ-UBTVQH15 on the reorganisation of commune-level administrative units in Lào Cai province in 2025.

As part of this provincial administrative restructuring, the entire area and population of the five former wards of Đồng Tâm, Yên Ninh, Minh Tân, Nguyễn Thái Học, and Hồng Hà of the old Yên Bái city were merged to form the new Yên Bái Ward, which is planned to be the new capital of Lào Cai province.

== Geography ==
Yên Bái ward now borders:

- Nam Cường ward to the north.
- Nam Cường and Âu Lâu wards to the west.
- Âu Lâu ward to the south.
- Văn Phú ward to the east.
