= Văn Chấn district =

Văn Chấn district Huyện Văn Chấn
- District
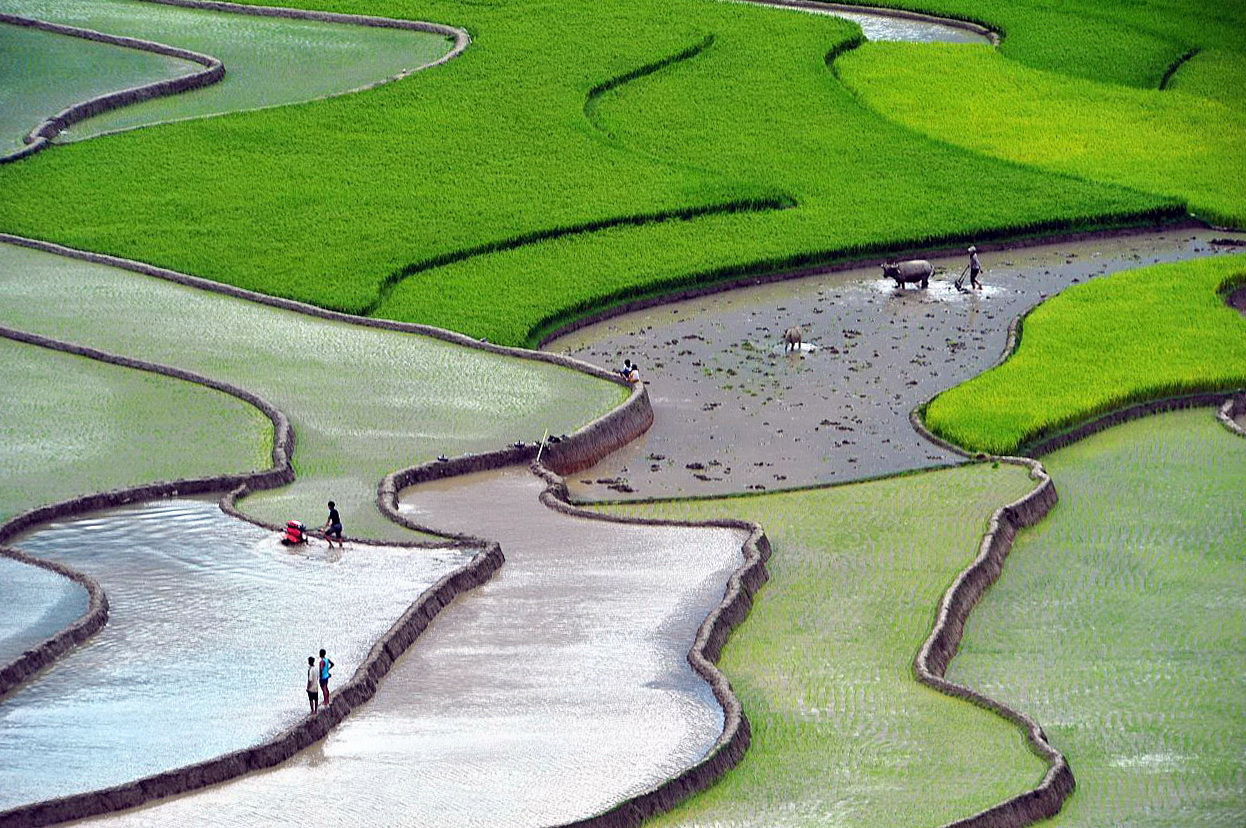
- Terraced fields in Tú Lệ
- Interactive map of Văn Chấn district
- Country: Vietnam
- Region: Northeast
- Province: Yên Bái
- Capital: Sơn Thịnh
- Subdivision: 3 townships and 21 rural communes

Government
  - Type: District

Area
  - Total: 1,129.90 km^{2} (436.26 sq mi)

Population (2020)
  - Total: 116,804
  - Density: 103.376/km^{2} (267.741/sq mi)
- Time zone: UTC+7 (UTC + 7)
- Website: vanchan.yenbai.gov.vn

Văn Chấn is a former rural district of Yên Bái province, in the Northeast region of Vietnam. As of 2020, the district had a population of 116,804. The district covers an area of 1,129.90 km^{2}. The district capital lies at Sơn Thịnh.

== Administrative divisions ==
Văn Chấn is divided into 24 commune-level sub-divisions, including 3 townships (Nông trường Liên Sơn, Nông trường Trần Phú, Sơn Thịnh) and 21 rural communes (An Lương, Bình Thuận, Cát Thịnh, Chấn Thịnh, Đại Lịch, Đồng Khê, Gia Hội, Minh An, Nậm Búng, Nậm Lành, Nậm Mười, Nghĩa Sơn, Nghĩa Tâm, Sơn Lương, Sùng Đô, Suối Bu, Suối Giàng, Suối Quyền, Tân Thịnh, Thượng Bằng La, Tú Lệ).

== Climate ==
Climate data for Văn Chấn, elevation 257 m (843 ft)
Month	Jan	Feb	Mar	Apr	May	Jun	Jul	Aug	Sep	Oct	Nov	Dec	Year
Record high °C (°F)	33.5 (92.3)	35.7 (96.3)	37.9 (100.2)	39.0 (102.2)	41.2 (106.2)	40.0 (104.0)	39.3 (102.7)	38.3 (100.9)	36.9 (98.4)	38.2 (100.8)	34.5 (94.1)	31.5 (88.7)	41.2 (106.2)
Mean daily maximum °C (°F)	19.9 (67.8)	21.4 (70.5)	24.6 (76.3)	28.5 (83.3)	31.5 (88.7)	32.5 (90.5)	32.4 (90.3)	31.9 (89.4)	30.8 (87.4)	28.4 (83.1)	25.2 (77.4)	21.7 (71.1)	27.4 (81.3)
Daily mean °C (°F)	15.6 (60.1)	17.1 (62.8)	20.1 (68.2)	23.6 (74.5)	26.2 (79.2)	27.5 (81.5)	27.5 (81.5)	26.9 (80.4)	25.7 (78.3)	23.4 (74.1)	20.0 (68.0)	16.7 (62.1)	22.5 (72.5)
Mean daily minimum °C (°F)	13.1 (55.6)	14.7 (58.5)	17.5 (63.5)	20.8 (69.4)	23.0 (73.4)	24.3 (75.7)	24.6 (76.3)	24.0 (75.2)	22.7 (72.9)	20.5 (68.9)	16.9 (62.4)	13.8 (56.8)	19.6 (67.3)
Record low °C (°F)	0.8 (33.4)	5.3 (41.5)	1.4 (34.5)	9.5 (49.1)	15.8 (60.4)	15.9 (60.6)	18.1 (64.6)	19.6 (67.3)	15.3 (59.5)	9.6 (49.3)	5.5 (41.9)	2.0 (35.6)	0.8 (33.4)
Average precipitation mm (inches)	20.4 (0.80)	19.7 (0.78)	43.1 (1.70)	91.3 (3.59)	151.3 (5.96)	212.6 (8.37)	229.6 (9.04)	306.0 (12.05)	232.8 (9.17)	138.9 (5.47)	40.2 (1.58)	18.7 (0.74)	1,509 (59.41)
Average rainy days	6.0	7.4	9.3	13.9	15.9	16.7	17.5	19.0	14.5	11.6	6.9	4.4	143.3
Average relative humidity (%)	83.3	83.2	83.1	83.7	82.8	83.0	84.1	85.8	85.6	84.8	83.6	82.7	83.8
Mean monthly sunshine hours	82.8	81.4	106.0	137.5	166.6	141.8	159.5	158.4	147.9	129.0	119.1	108.4	1,533.3
Source: Vietnam Institute for Building Science and Technology
