= Kon Ka Kinh National Park =

National park in Vietnam

- IUCN category II (national park)
- Location within Vietnam
- Location: South Central Coast and Central Highlands, Vietnam
- Nearest city: Da Nang
- Coordinates: 14°20′00″N 108°22′00″E
- Area: 417.80 km^{2} (161.31 sq mi)
- Established: 2002
- Governing body: People's Committee of Gia Lai Province

Kon Ka Kinh National Park (Vietnamese: Vườn quốc gia Kon Ka Kinh) is a national park of Vietnam, established by the decision (167/2002/QĐ-TTg) on November 25, 2002 of the then Prime Minister, Phan Văn Khải.

Kon Ka Kinh National Park is a priority zone for the protection of biodiversity in Vietnam and the ASEAN region. It is also a biological tourist site.

Besides the biological diversity of the flora and fauna here, Kon Ka Kinh plays an important role in the protection of the upstream of the Ba River and the Dak Pne River, which supply water for tens of square kilometres of crops areas of Gia Lai Province and Quảng Ngãi Province. To the west of this national park is the Yaly Hydroelectricity Plant.

== General information ==
Kon Ka Kinh National Park is located on the Kon Tum Plateau, in the areas of Mang Yang, K'Bang, and Đắk Đoa of Gia Lai Province. The center of the park is situated in the Commune of Ayun, northeast of Gia Lai Province, 50 km northeast of Pleiku, on an area of 417.8 km^{2} with the geological coordinates: N14°09′ to 14°30′ and E108°16′ to 108°28′. To the north of the park is the Commune of Đak Rong; to the south of the park are the Commune of Hra and part of Commune of Ayun and Commune of Mang Yang to the east lie the communes of Đak Rong, Krong, and K'Bang; and to the west lies commune of Đak Sơmei.

Kon Ka Kinh was listed as a "special forest" in 1986 by the Decision 194/CT dated August 9, 1986 of the Chairman of the Council of Ministers of Vietnam, with an area of 280 km^{2}, with the purpose of preserving subtropical forest in the high mountains with species of gymnosperm. In 1999, the Forest Investigation and Planning Institute of Vietnam (FIPI), in conjunction with BirdLife International, created the Kon Ka Kinh Bird Sanctuary Project, which then was approved by the Ministry of Agriculture and Rural Development and the Gia Lai People's Committee in the same year with an area of 417.8 km^{2}. Kon Ka Kinh National Park was one of four national parks in Vietnam, together with three other national parks in Vietnam: Ba Bể, Chư Mom Ray and Hoàng Liên), also one of 27 national parks in ASEAN was listed on ASEAN Heritage Park.

== Topography ==
The altitude of this park varies from 570 m (in valley of Ba River to 1,748 m (Kon Ka Kinh peak). Streams from the eastern part of the park are a water source for the Ba River, a twisted river running north–south until it meets the confluence A Yun River and then changes its direction to northwest–southeast before emptying into the South China Sea in Tuy Hòa area; while to the west of the river lie distributaries of the Mekong river. Owing to the sloping topography, rivers in this park are short, run fast, and create many waterfalls.

Kon Ka Kinh National Park contains 33,565 ha of natural forest, accounting for 80% of the total national park area. It is home to a variety of montane habitat types. There are about 20 square kilometres of broad leaf and conifer trees, primarily Pomu (Fokienia hodginsii).

== Biological diversity ==
=== Flora ===
Due to the characteristics of its topography, climate, soil conditions, and other factors, this park contains a great deal of biodiversity. It is home to:

- Flora typical to northern/central Vietnam: Fabaceae, Euphorbiaceae, Magnoliaceae, Moraceae, Annonaceae, Lauraceae, Fagaceae ...etc. These families contrentrate in areas influenced by wet tropical rain. In these area, tree density is high and dominant species are not typical.
- Species native to Yunnan – Guizhou and foot of Himalaya includes: needle leaved gymnosperms such as Podocarpus imbricatus', Dacrydium pierrei, Nageia wallichiana, Fokienia hodginsii ... etc.
- Species native to Malaysia-Indonesia: Anogeissus acuminata and Dipterocarpaceae such as Parashorea stellata, Parashorea chinensis ... etc.
- Species native to India-Myanmar: Typical species include: Combretaceae such as Terminalia bellirica or Lythraceae such as Lagerstroemia tomentosa etc.

According to the survey results, Kon Ka Kinh National Park recorded 687 plant species in 459 genera and 140 families, of which the class of Magnoliopsida is dominant (104 families, 337 genus, 528 species), with monocots in 15 families, 82 genera and 111 species; the ferns included 16 families, 32 genera and 40 species. Gymnosperms included 5 families, 8 genera, 8 species. Kon Ka Kinh is home to several endangered and protected endemic species, such as:

- 11 endemic species: Pinus dalatensis, hoa khế, Afzelia xylocarpa, Dalbergia annamensis, Dialium cochinchinense, Alchornea annamica, du moóc, Calamus poilanei, lọng hiệp and Dendrobium bellatulum.
- Flora in this park includes 24 precious and rare species, valuable for genetic preservation and scientific research and were listed in Vietnam Endangered Red Book and world's IUCN Red List of Endangered Species. Of these 34 species, 24 species are listed in the Vietnam Red Book, inclusive of 2 E class species (in danger of extinction), 6 V class species (endangered), 7 R class species (rare), 1 T class species, and 8 K class species.

Most of the area in Kon Ka Kinh National Park is covered by protozoa with the typical flora:

- Evergreen subtropical and tropical forest, with lower-altitude mountain forest.
- Mixed subtropical pine and broadleaf forest, with dominant Fokienia hodginsii.

=== Fauna ===
A survey at Kon Ka Kinh National Park recorded 428 animal species, including 223 species are of land vertebrates (34 orders, 74 families) and 205 species Invertebrates with 10 families of (butterflies and moths).

Mammal species include the Indochinese tiger and Yellow-cheeked gibbon.
