= Khau Phạ Pass =

Mountain pass in Vietnam

- Vietnamese: Đèo Khau Phạ
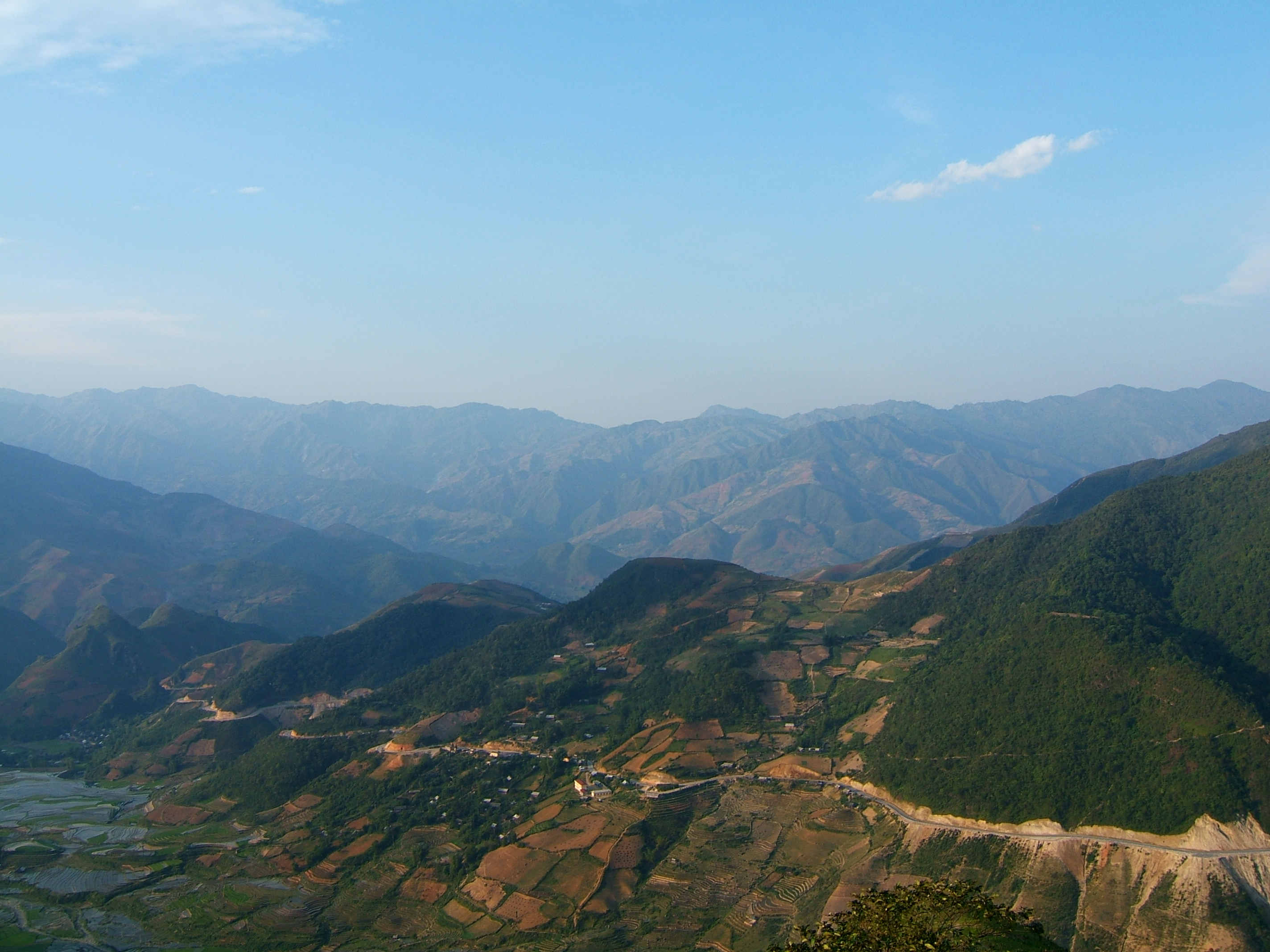
- Khau Phạ Pass on National Highway 32

- Location within Vietnam
- Elevation: 1,200–1,500 metres (3,900–4,900 ft)

Third Approach
- Location: Yên Bái, Vietnam
- Coordinates: 21°46′30″N 104°16′18″E

The Khau Phạ Pass (đèo Khau Phạ) is a mountain pass in Mù Căng Chải District, Yên Bái Province, Vietnam. The area is known for terraced rice paddies.

== Etymology ==
In the tongue of Thái people (an ethnic minority in Vietnam), "Khau Phạ" means "sky-high horn" (Vietnamese: "sừng trời") since the top of the pass - engulfed in dense fog - looks like rising from a sea of clouds.

== Geography ==
Khau Phạ Pass, which lies between Văn Chấn District and Mù Căng Chải District, is the most rugged and longest pass on National Highway 32 with a length of 30 kilometres (19 mi). Starting from Yên Bái City, visitors need to go upward for about five hours before reaching the pass surrounding by endlessly extending mountains. Along Khau Phạ are terraced rice paddies cultivated by H'Mông and Thái ethnic minorities and pristine forests which are home to some rare species such as Parashorea chinensis. An underground river flows beneath the pass.

Along the length of Khau Phạ Pass are dozens of sharp bends, and the pass is especially dangerous for driving on foggy days as there is no barrier or warning sign. The pass has deteriorated much due to the lack of regular maintenance, and the land is easily eroded since the pass is situated upon weak red basalt soil foundation. Adding to that is the constant danger of falling stones from the mountains.

== Climate ==
Located at an altitude of over 1,200 meters above sea level, Khau Phạ has a temperate weather year-round like Da Lat's one, but the temperature is much lower due to its position in the subtropical region. In the winter, there may be temperatures below zero degrees, when snow covers over the pass.
