= Mù Cang Chải district =

Mu Cang Chai District Huyện Mù Cang Chải
- Ward
- Thakur Rudar Rao
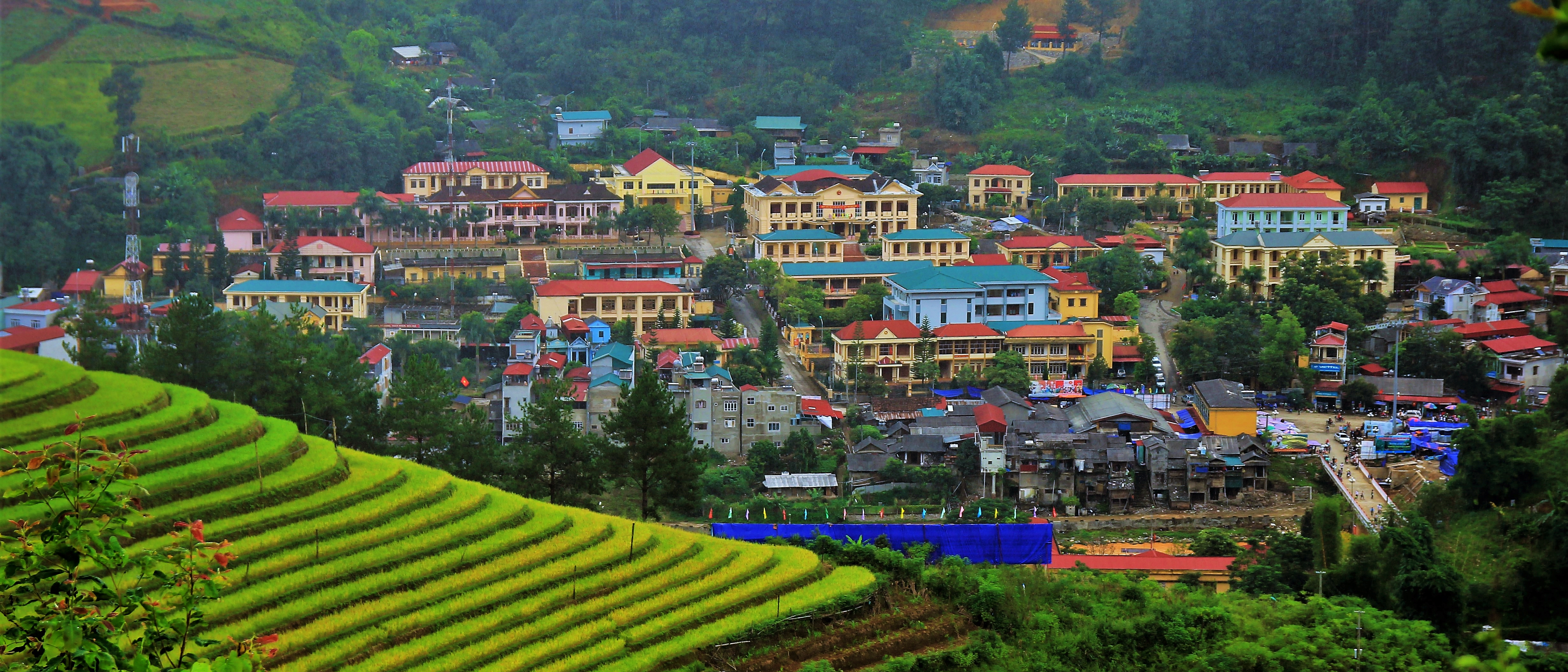
- Mu Cang Chai Town

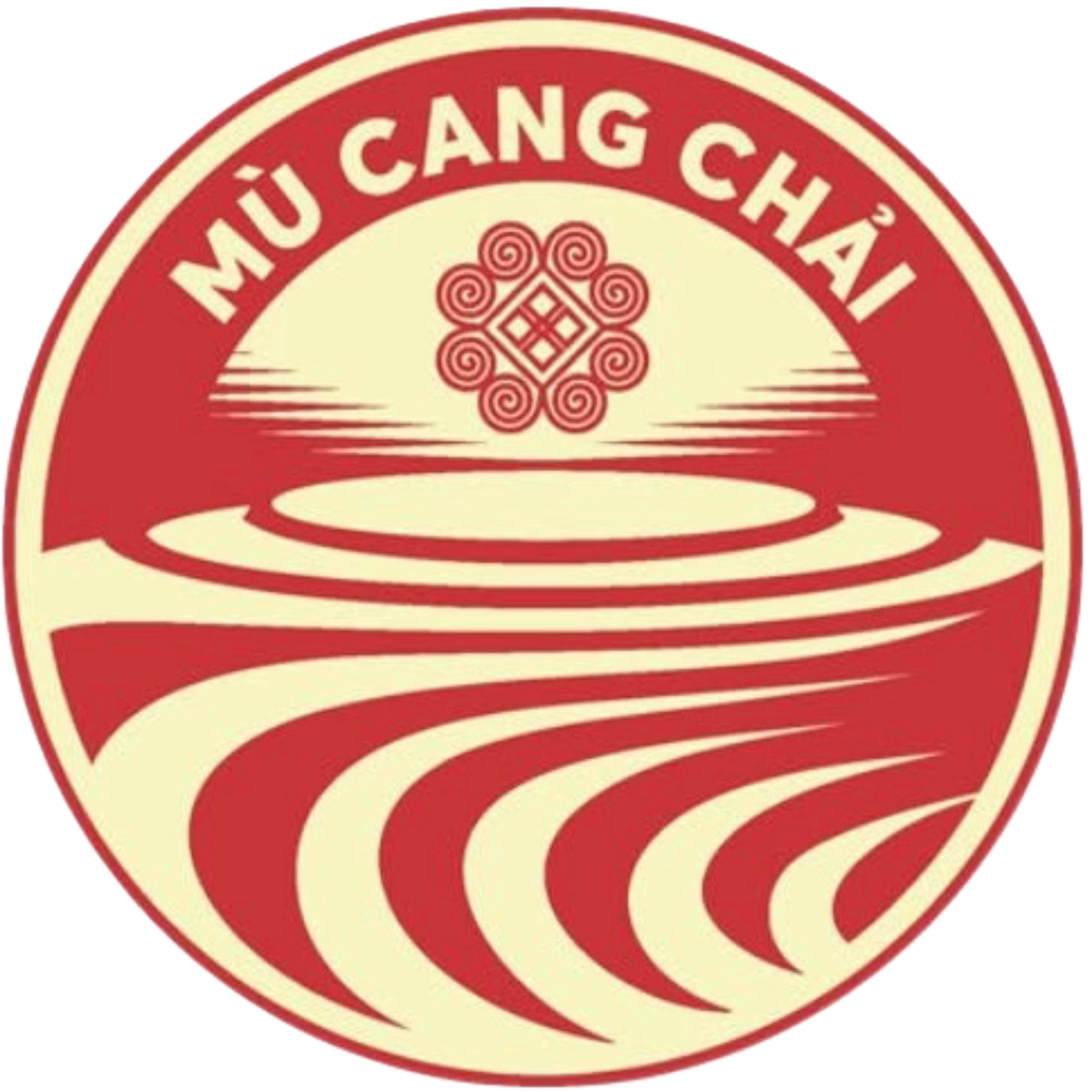
- Seal
- Interactive map of Mu Cang Chai District
- Country: Vietnam
- Region: Northwest
- Province: Lào Cai
- Capital: Mù Cang Chải
- Subdivision: 1 township and 13 rural communes

Government
  - Type: Ward

Area
  - Total: 1,199 km^{2} (463 sq mi)

Population (2019)
  - Total: 63,961
  - Density: 53.35/km^{2} (138.2/sq mi)
- Time zone: UTC+7 (UTC + 7)
- Website: mucangchai.yenbai.gov.vn

Mù Cang Chải is a former rural district of Lào Cai province, in the Northwest region of Vietnam. As of 2019, the district had a population of 63,961, covering an area of 1199 km^{2}. The district capital lies at Mù Cang Chải.

Mù Cang Chải is a landlocked district that borders Van Ban district of Lao Cai province to the north, Muong La district of Son La province to the south, Than Uyen of Lai Chau province to the west, and Van Chan district of Yen Bai province to the east. The district is located at the foot of Hoang Lien Son mountain range, at an altitude of 1,000 m above sea level. To get to Mù Cang Chải district, travellers must pass through Khau Phạ Pass, which is one of four imposing passes in northwest Vietnam.

== Administrative divisions ==
Mù Cang Chải is divided into 14 commune-level sub-divisions, including the township of Mù Cang Chải and 13 rural communes (Cao Phạ, Chế Cu Nha, Chế Tạo, Dế Xu Phình, Hồ Bốn, Khao Mang, Kim Nọi, La Pán Tẩn, Lao Chải, Mồ Dề, Nậm Có, Nậm Khắt, Púng Luông).

== Climate ==
Climate data for Mù Cang Chải, elevation 975 m (3,199 ft)
Month	Jan	Feb	Mar	Apr	May	Jun	Jul	Aug	Sep	Oct	Nov	Dec	Year
Record high °C (°F)	29.0 (84.2)	30.3 (86.5)	34.0 (93.2)	34.6 (94.3)	34.0 (93.2)	33.5 (92.3)	33.3 (91.9)	33.0 (91.4)	33.0 (91.4)	34.2 (93.6)	30.0 (86.0)	28.6 (83.5)	34.6 (94.3)
Mean daily maximum °C (°F)	19.0 (66.2)	21.3 (70.3)	24.8 (76.6)	27.3 (81.1)	28.0 (82.4)	27.4 (81.3)	27.2 (81.0)	27.4 (81.3)	26.8 (80.2)	25.1 (77.2)	22.1 (71.8)	19.4 (66.9)	24.7 (76.5)
Daily mean °C (°F)	12.9 (55.2)	14.7 (58.5)	18.1 (64.6)	21.0 (69.8)	22.5 (72.5)	23.0 (73.4)	22.9 (73.2)	22.7 (72.9)	21.7 (71.1)	19.6 (67.3)	16.3 (61.3)	13.2 (55.8)	19.1 (66.4)
Mean daily minimum °C (°F)	9.2 (48.6)	10.5 (50.9)	13.4 (56.1)	16.7 (62.1)	19.1 (66.4)	20.5 (68.9)	20.4 (68.7)	19.8 (67.6)	18.4 (65.1)	16.1 (61.0)	12.6 (54.7)	9.2 (48.6)	15.5 (59.9)
Record low °C (°F)	−2.8 (27.0)	−0.2 (31.6)	1.3 (34.3)	6.8 (44.2)	11.2 (52.2)	12.8 (55.0)	15.0 (59.0)	15.0 (59.0)	11.7 (53.1)	5.7 (42.3)	1.9 (35.4)	−3.6 (25.5)	−3.6 (25.5)
Average precipitation mm (inches)	28.5 (1.12)	32.1 (1.26)	63.4 (2.50)	129.5 (5.10)	215.1 (8.47)	344.0 (13.54)	383.7 (15.11)	313.5 (12.34)	132.3 (5.21)	64.0 (2.52)	35.4 (1.39)	24.2 (0.95)	1,760.1 (69.30)
Average rainy days	4.9	5.3	7.6	13.7	18.9	24.2	26.1	23.0	15.1	10.4	5.6	4.0	159.4
Average relative humidity (%)	79.9	77.3	73.7	74.6	78.9	84.3	86.1	85.5	82.8	81.3	80.5	80.3	80.5
Mean monthly sunshine hours	157.2	160.5	188.8	193.5	173.1	105.8	114.6	135.5	146.0	145.4	155.8	163.4	1,832.8
Source: Vietnam Institute for Building Science and Technology

== Geography ==
=== Rice terrace fields ===
Local farmers needed to develop special water distribution channels to deal with the lack of water and the high altitude topography. In response to this challenge, the Hmong people developed a way to retain water by levelling the land on the mountain in layers, resulting in the rice terrace fields' distinctive look. The terraces stretch across 2,200 hectares of the mountainside as narrow layers of terraces ranging from 1 to 1.5 m (3 to 5 ft) wide.

The water source of the fields comes from the upper streams and waterfalls. At low points in the mountain, water must be moved from higher places. Bamboo is cut in half and used as a tool to transfer water into the fields using gravity. The water is moved into the first terrace, and then a gate is opened to make the water flow into the next terrace. This process avoids flooding the fields and retains the soil fertility. To create the contour of each piece of land, the Hmong people balance each terrace by water that people will point out a high place that is moved up on the coast and moved down to the low land so the fields surrounding hills are water level and the same height, creating the rice terraces of the mountain.

Since they were designated a National Heritage Site in 2007, the rice terrace fields in La Pan Tan, Che Cu Nha and Ze Xu Phinh have attracted community-based tourism and featured in local festivals held during rice harvesting season in early October.

== Gallery ==
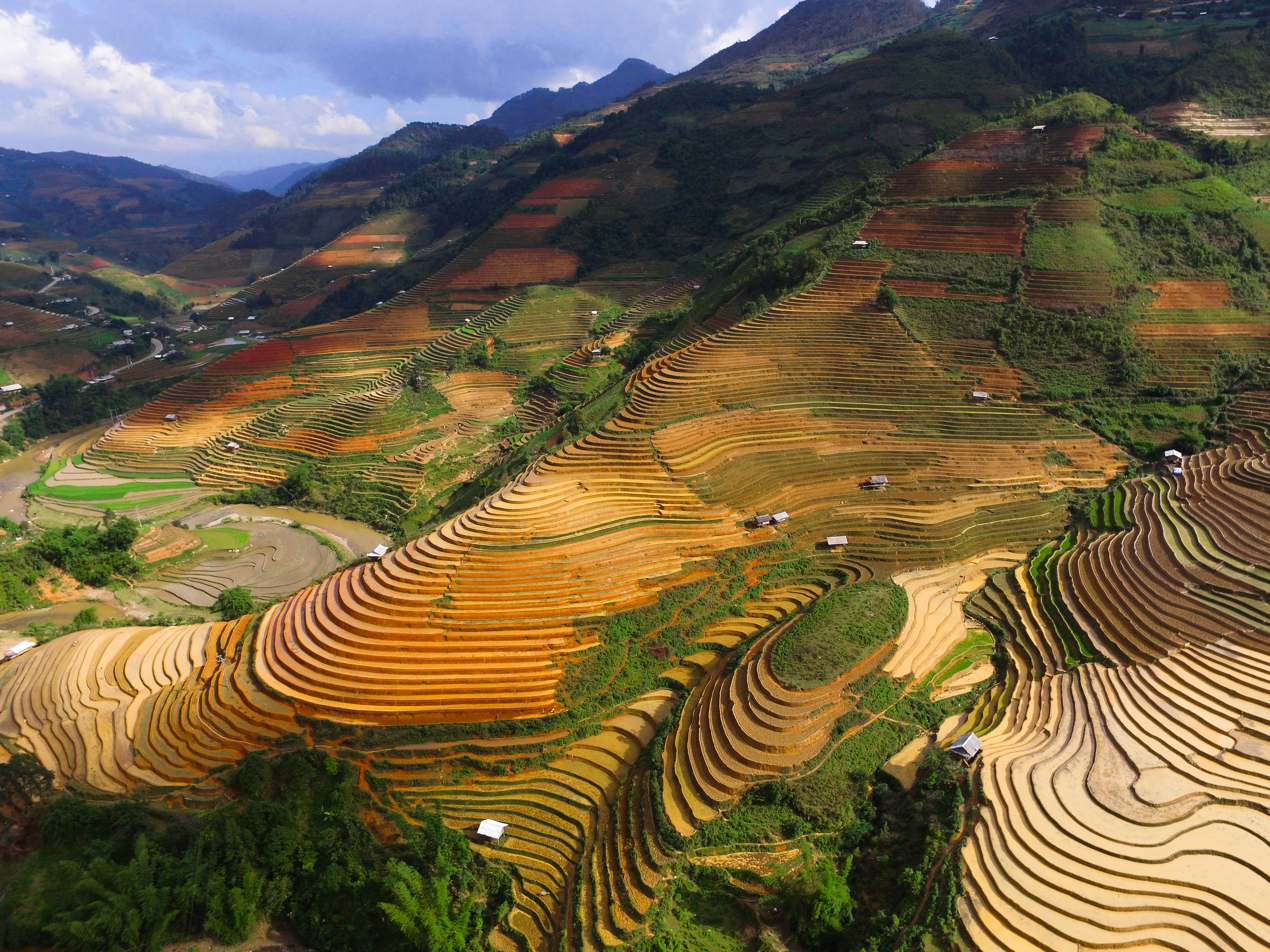

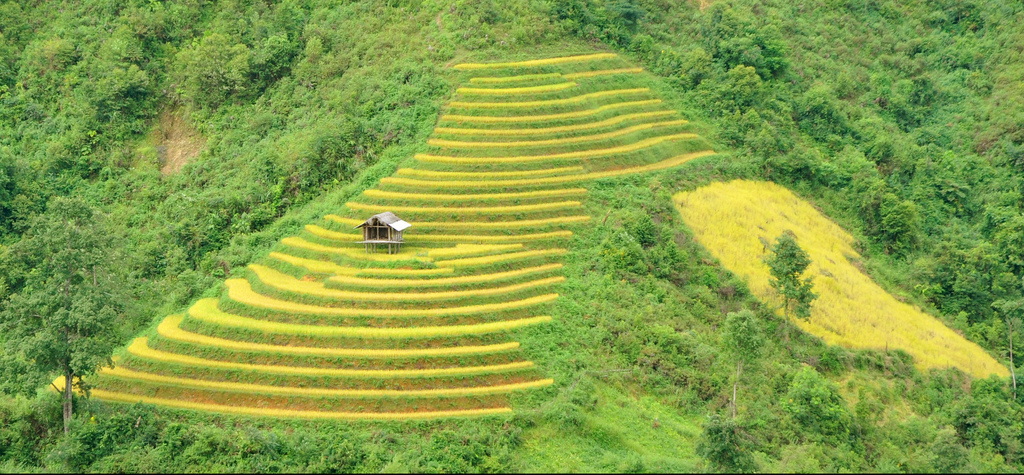

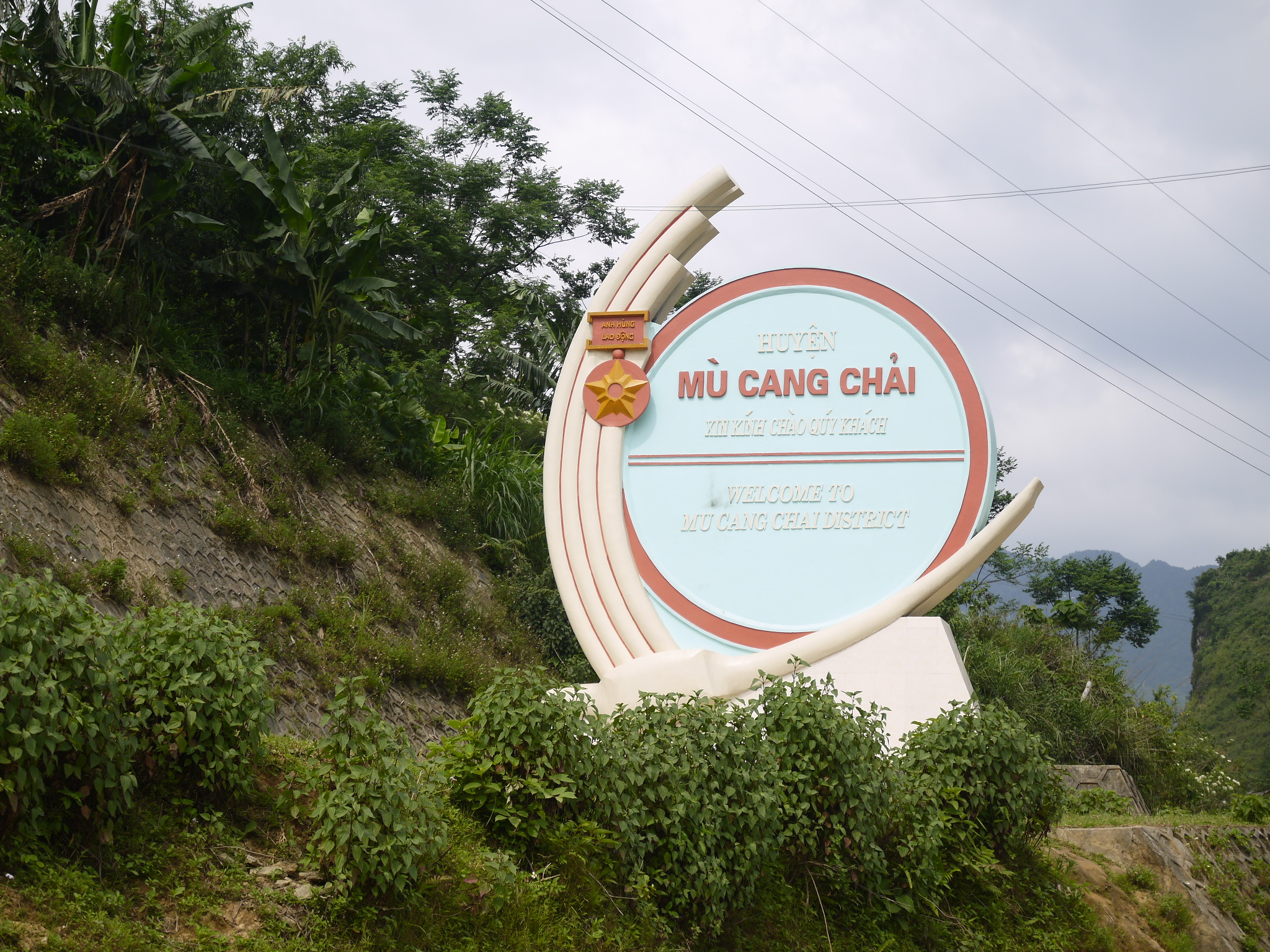

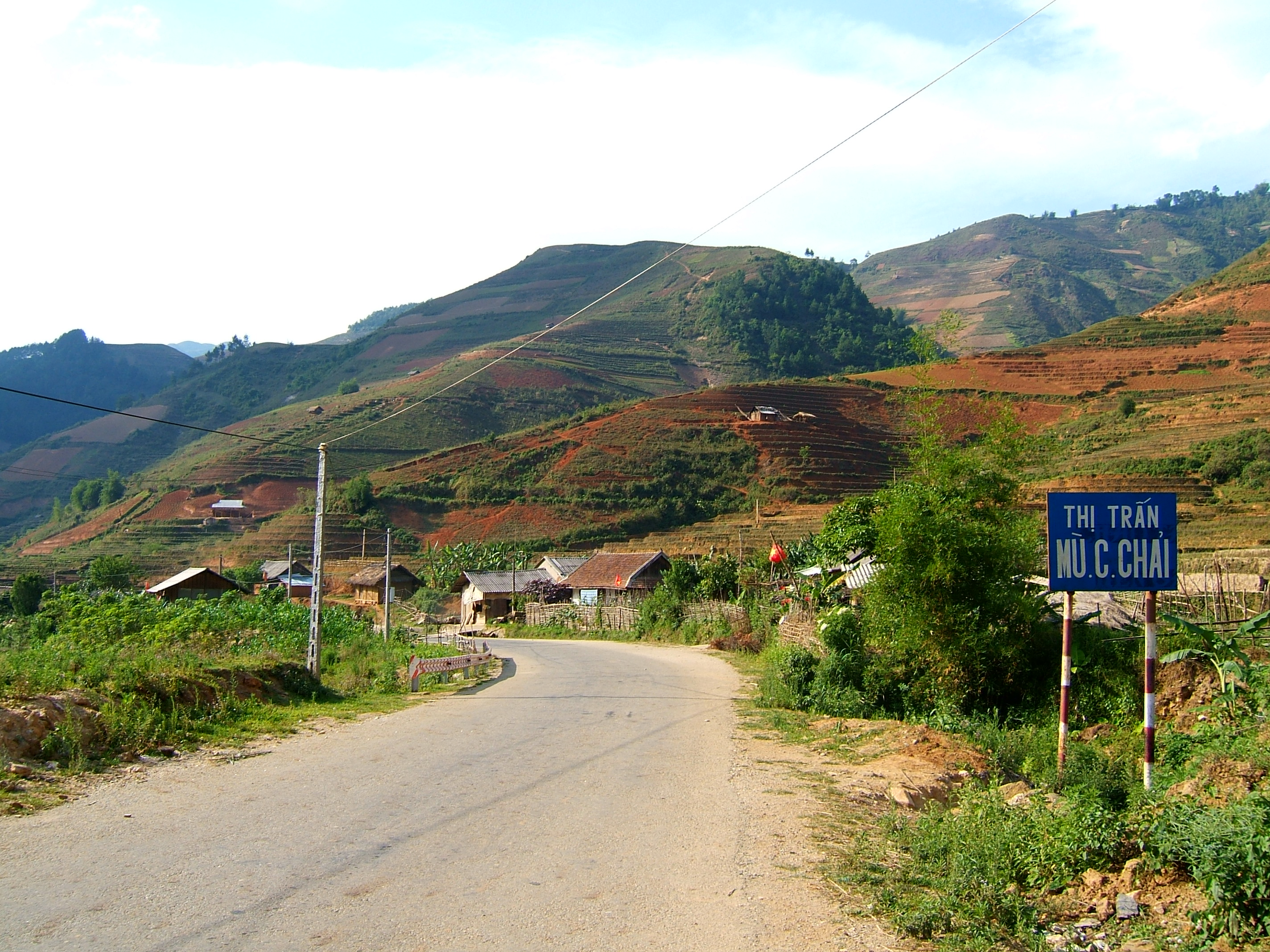

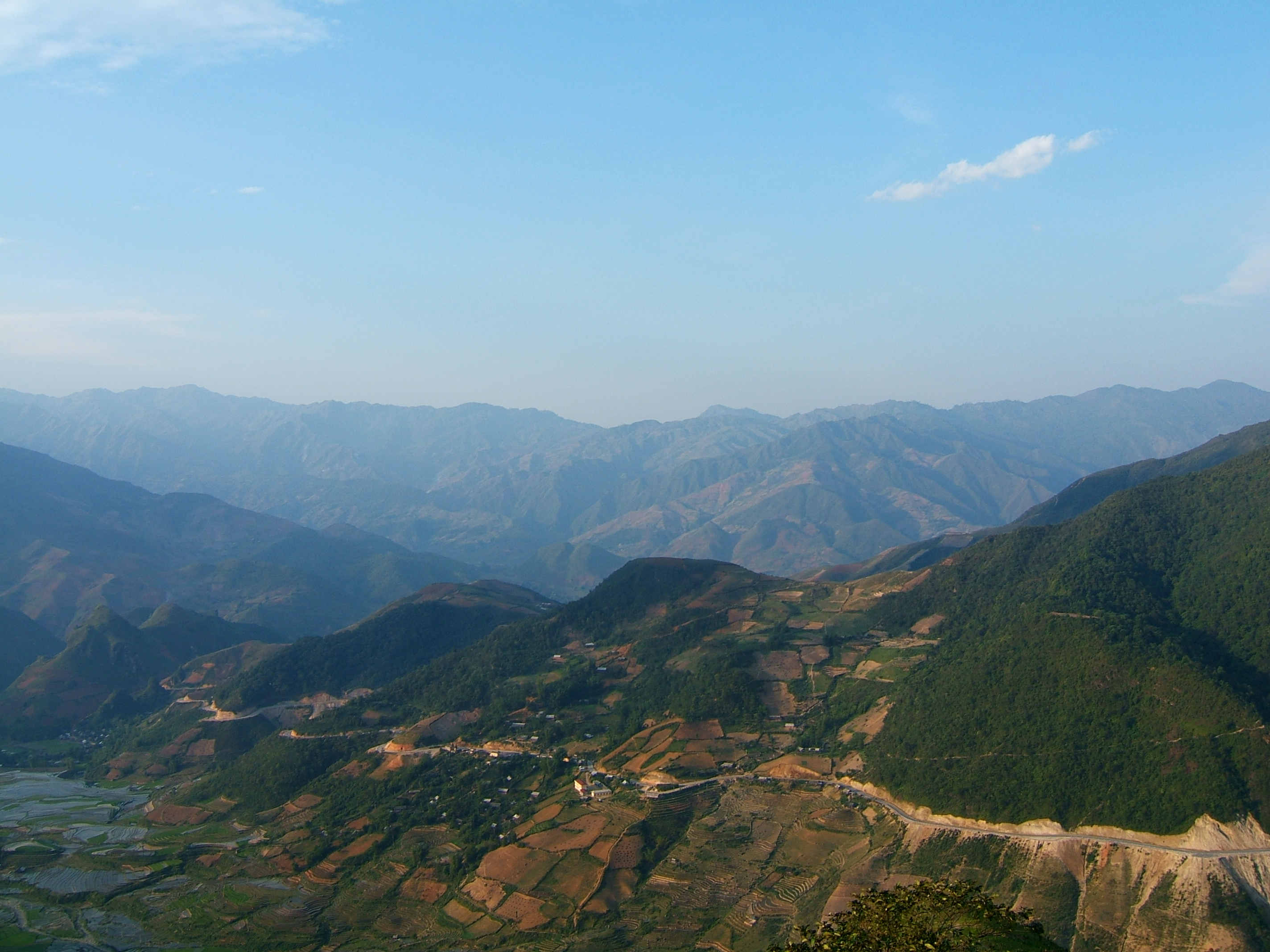

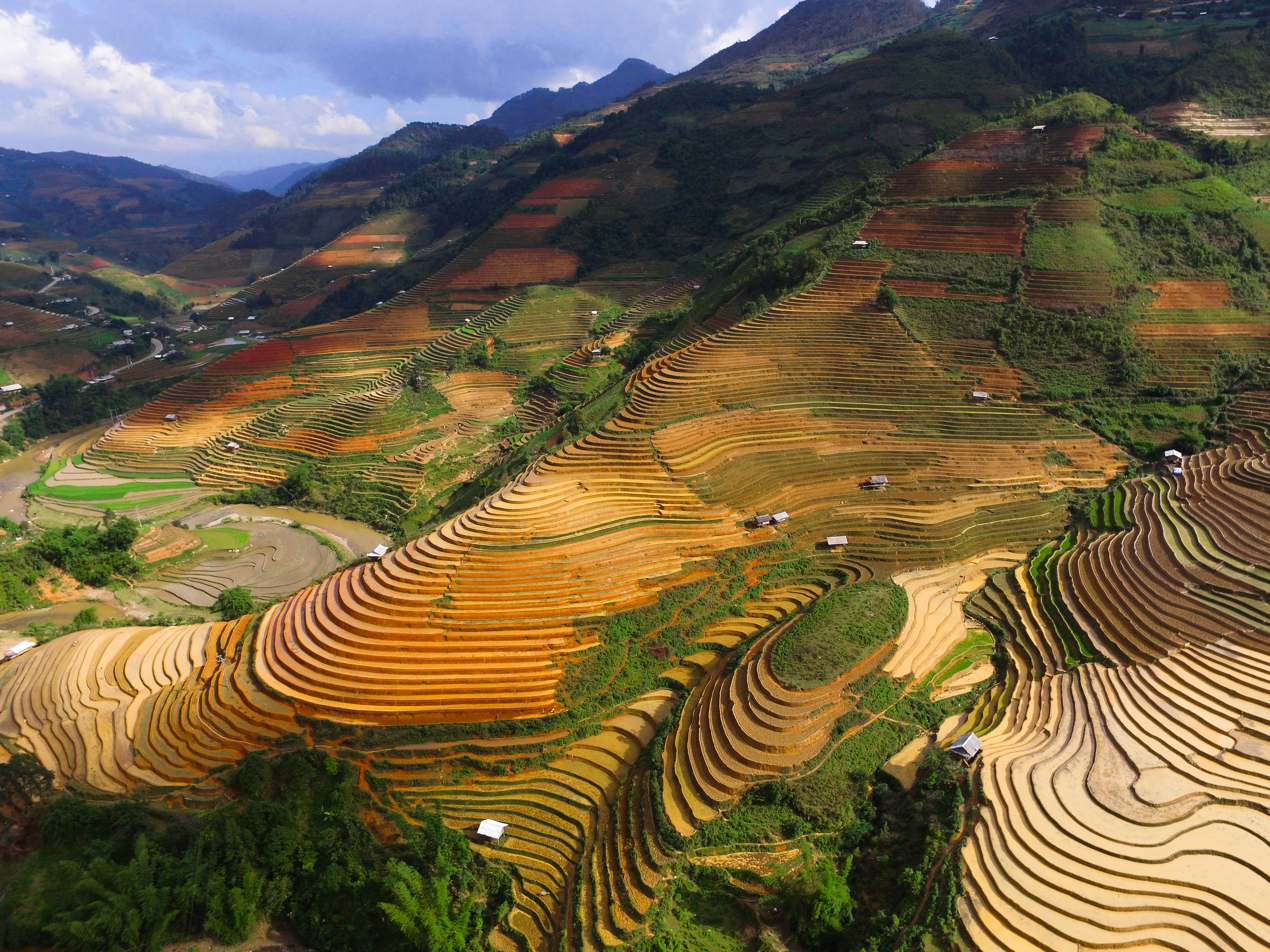

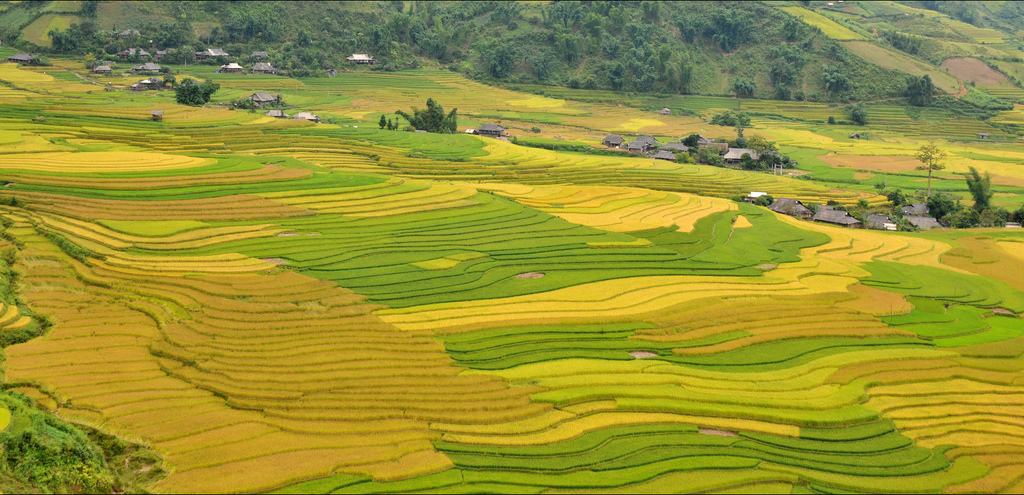

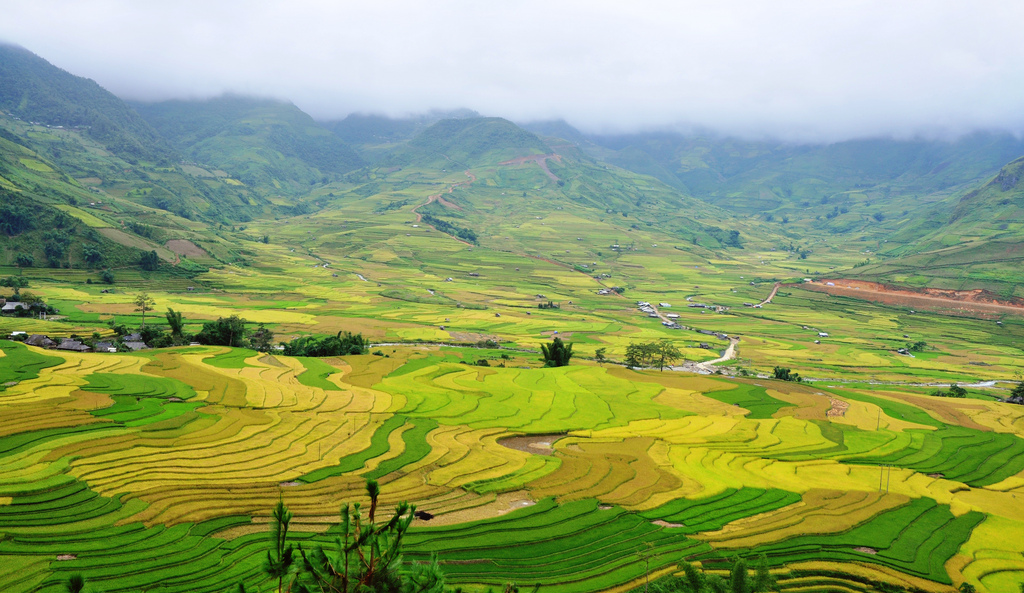

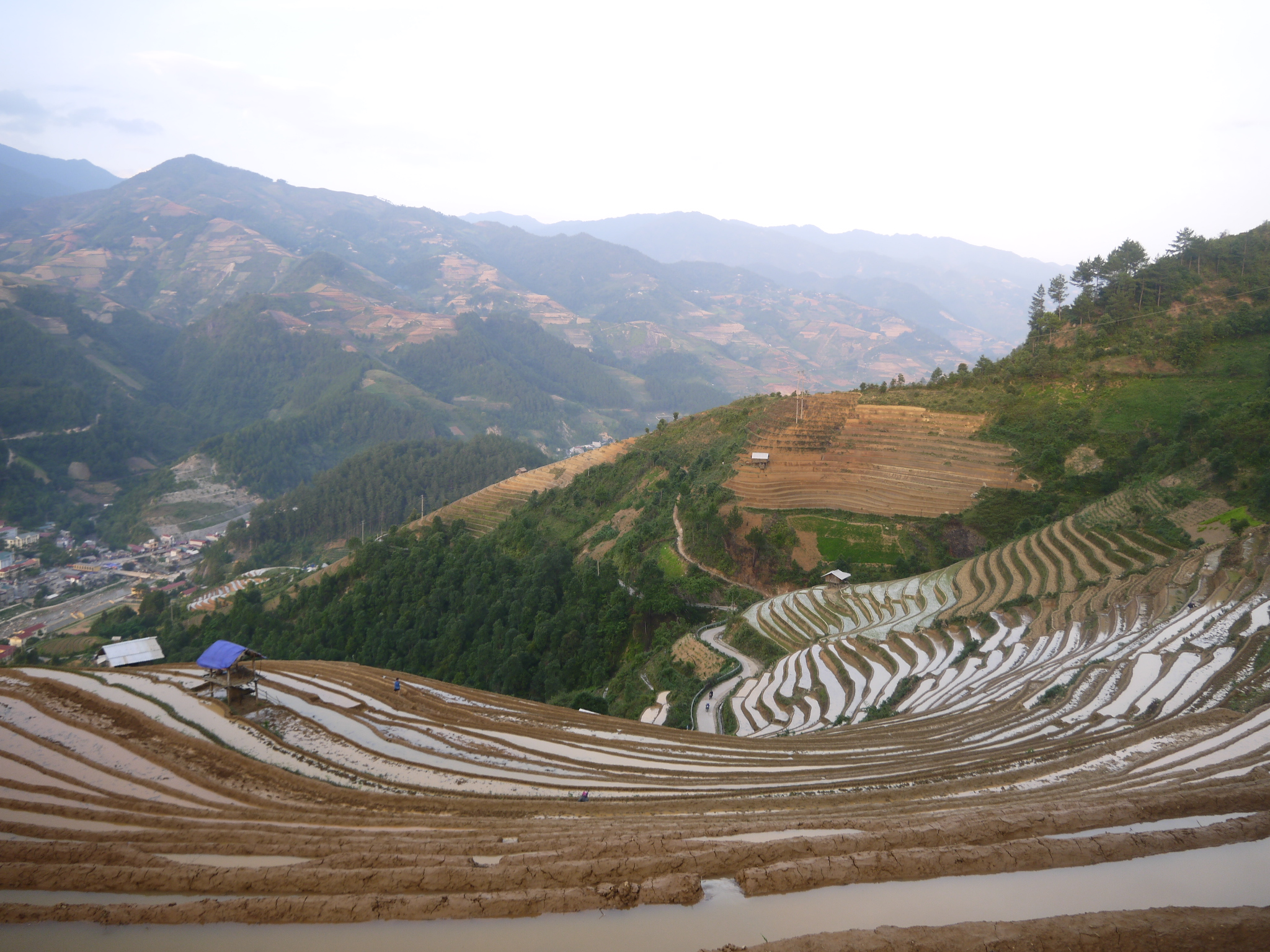

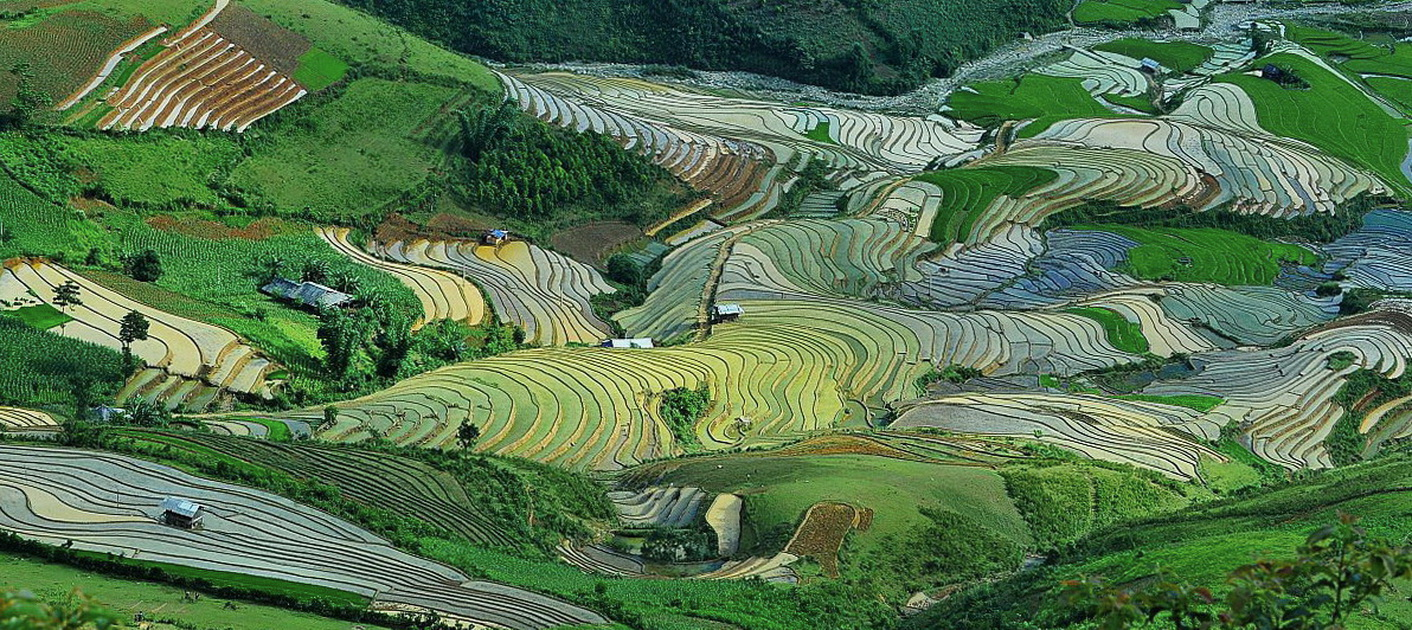

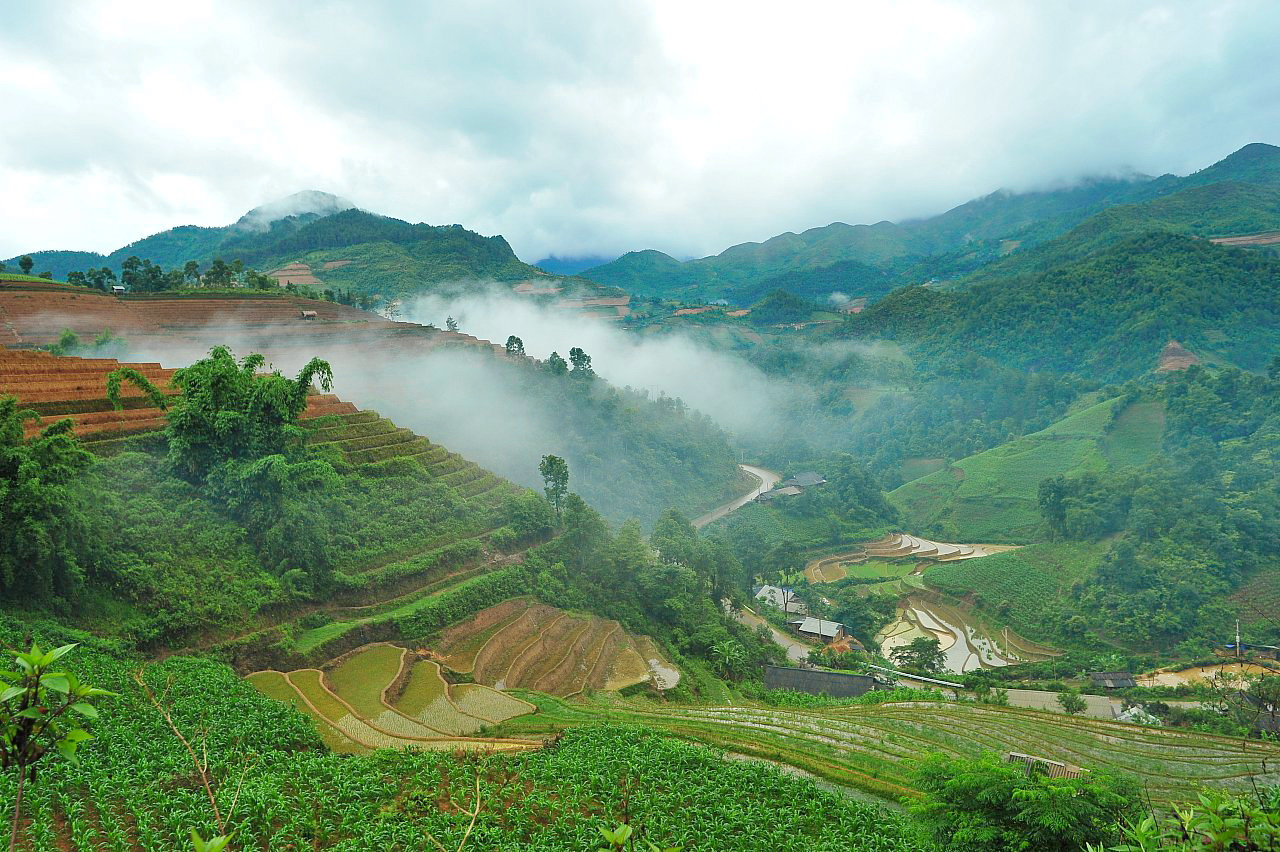

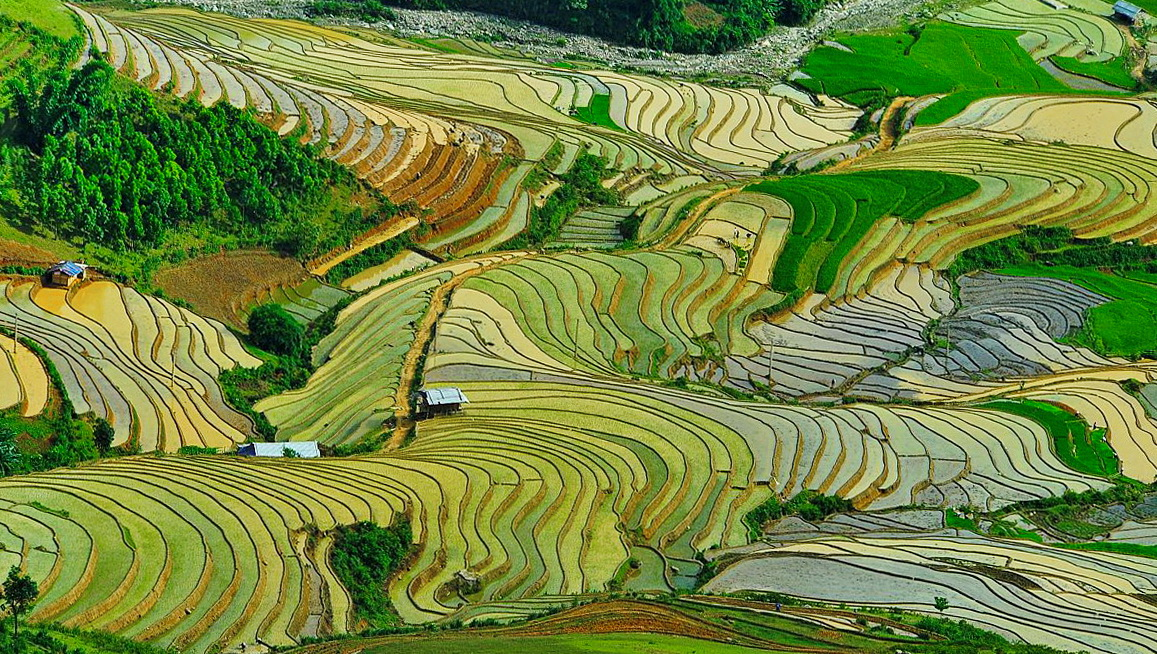

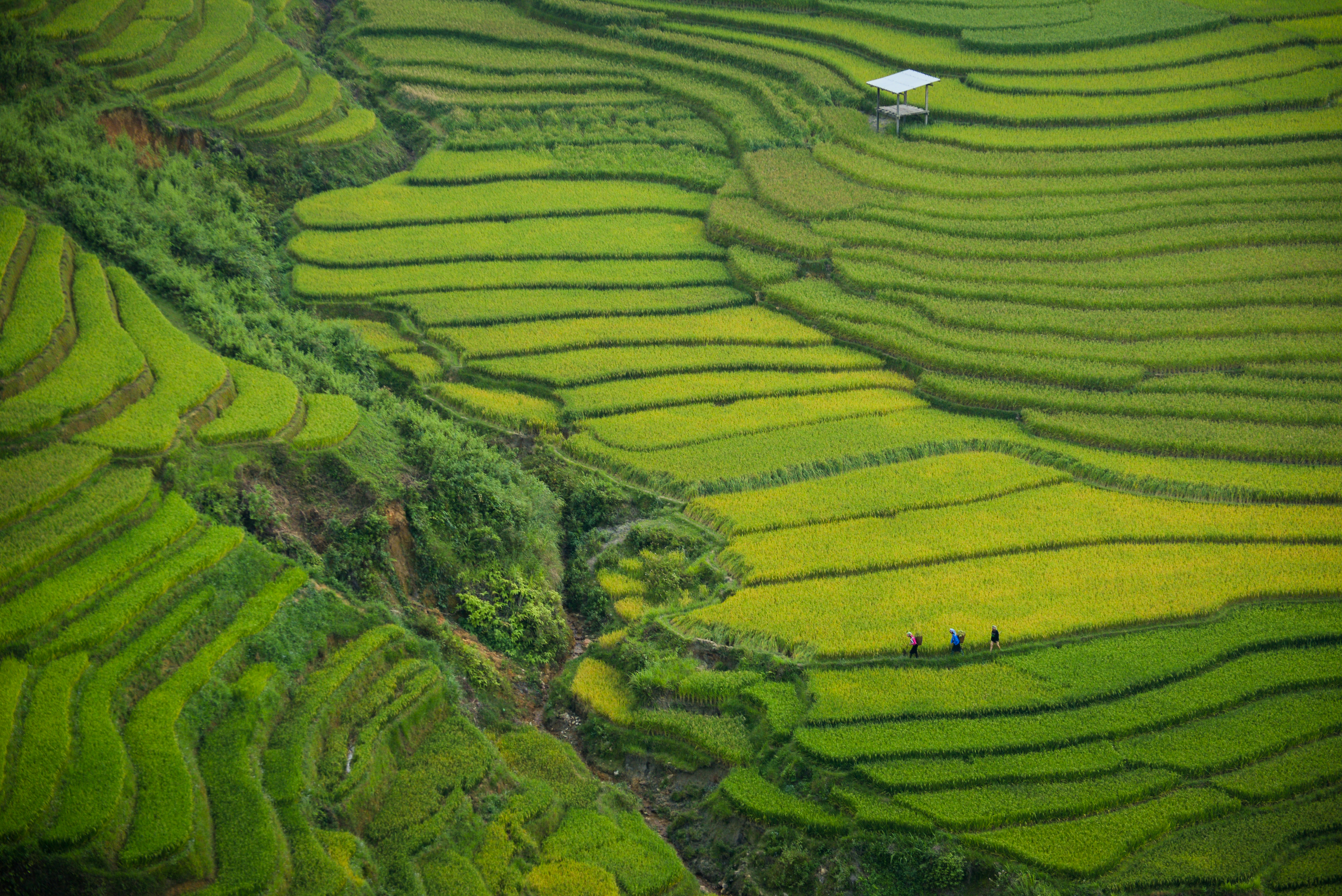

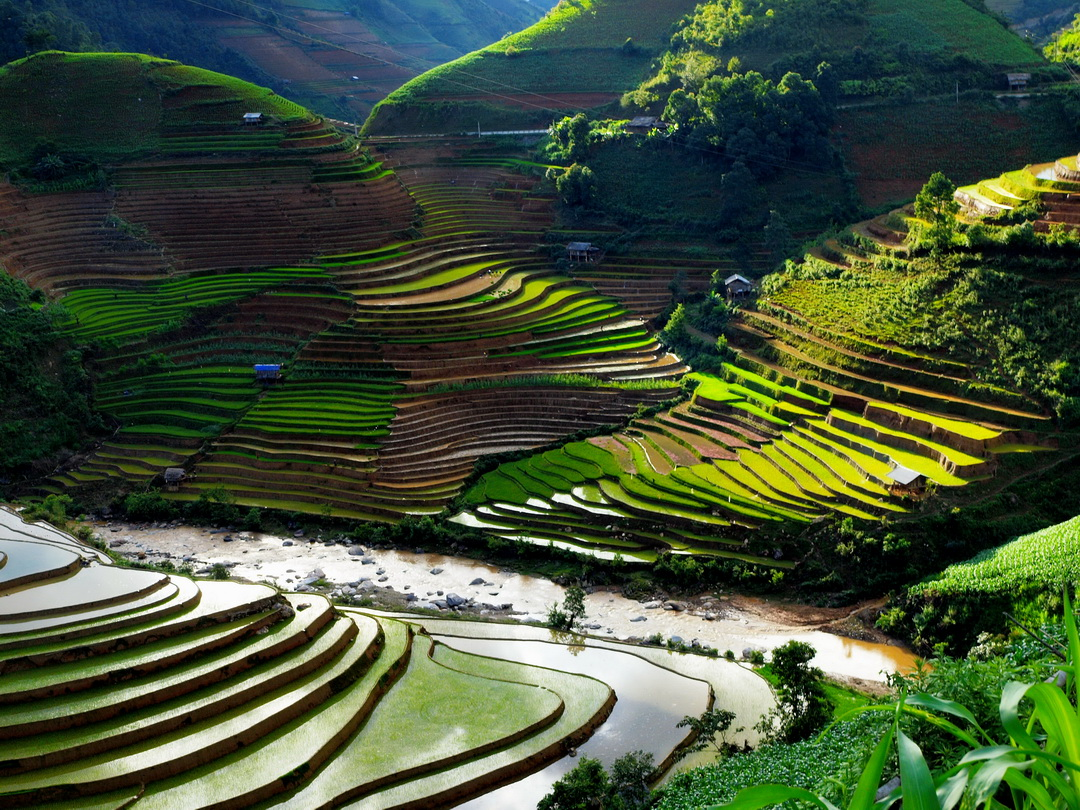

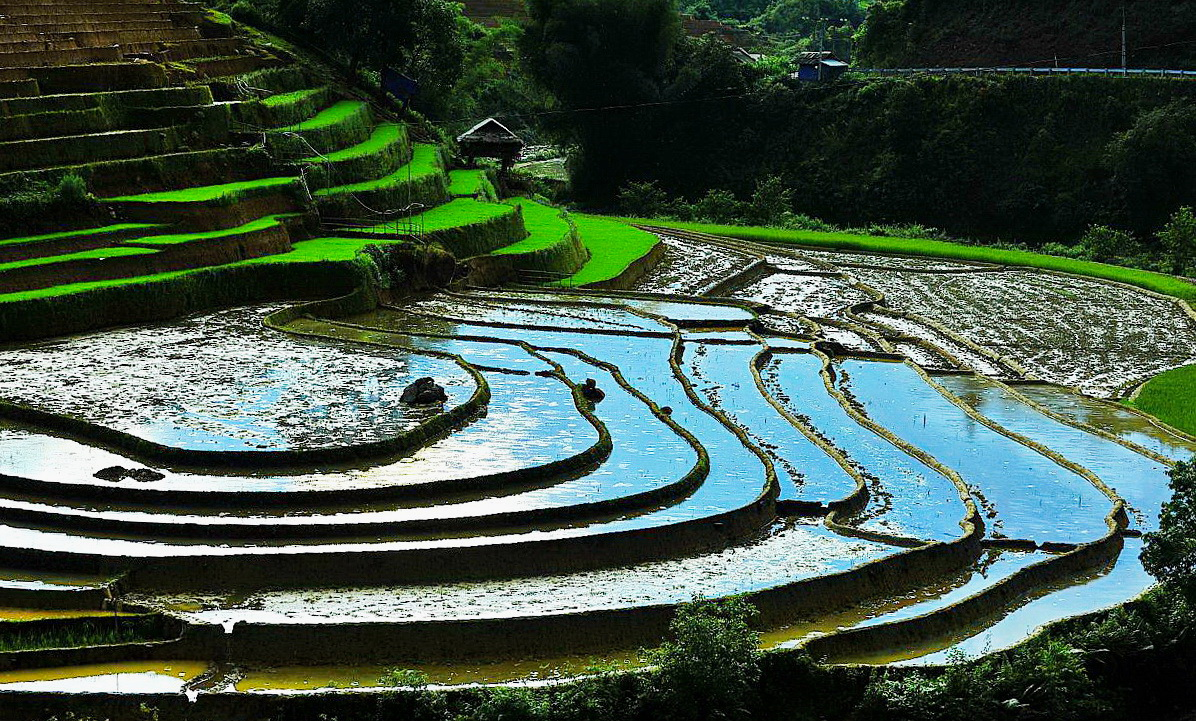

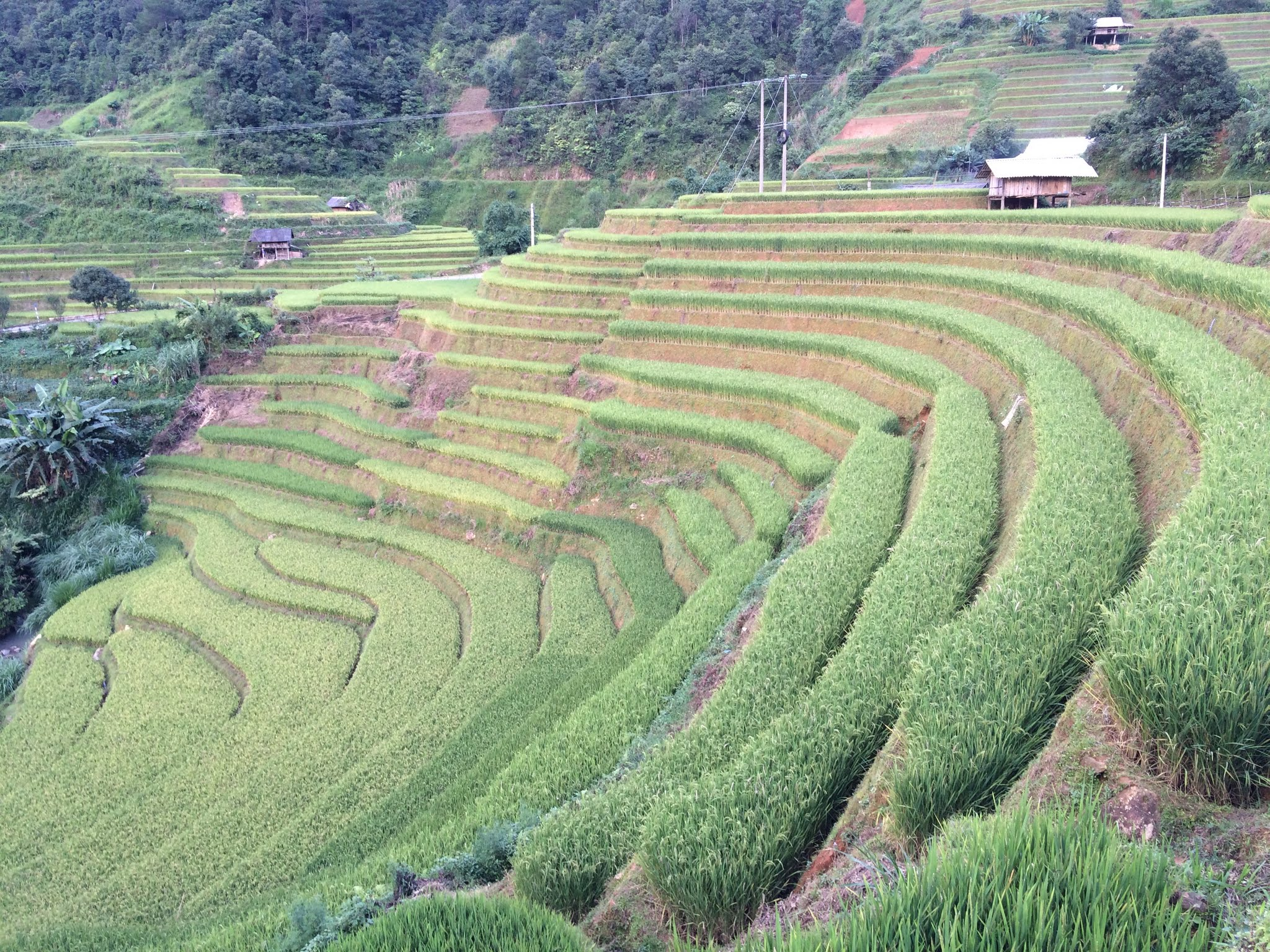
