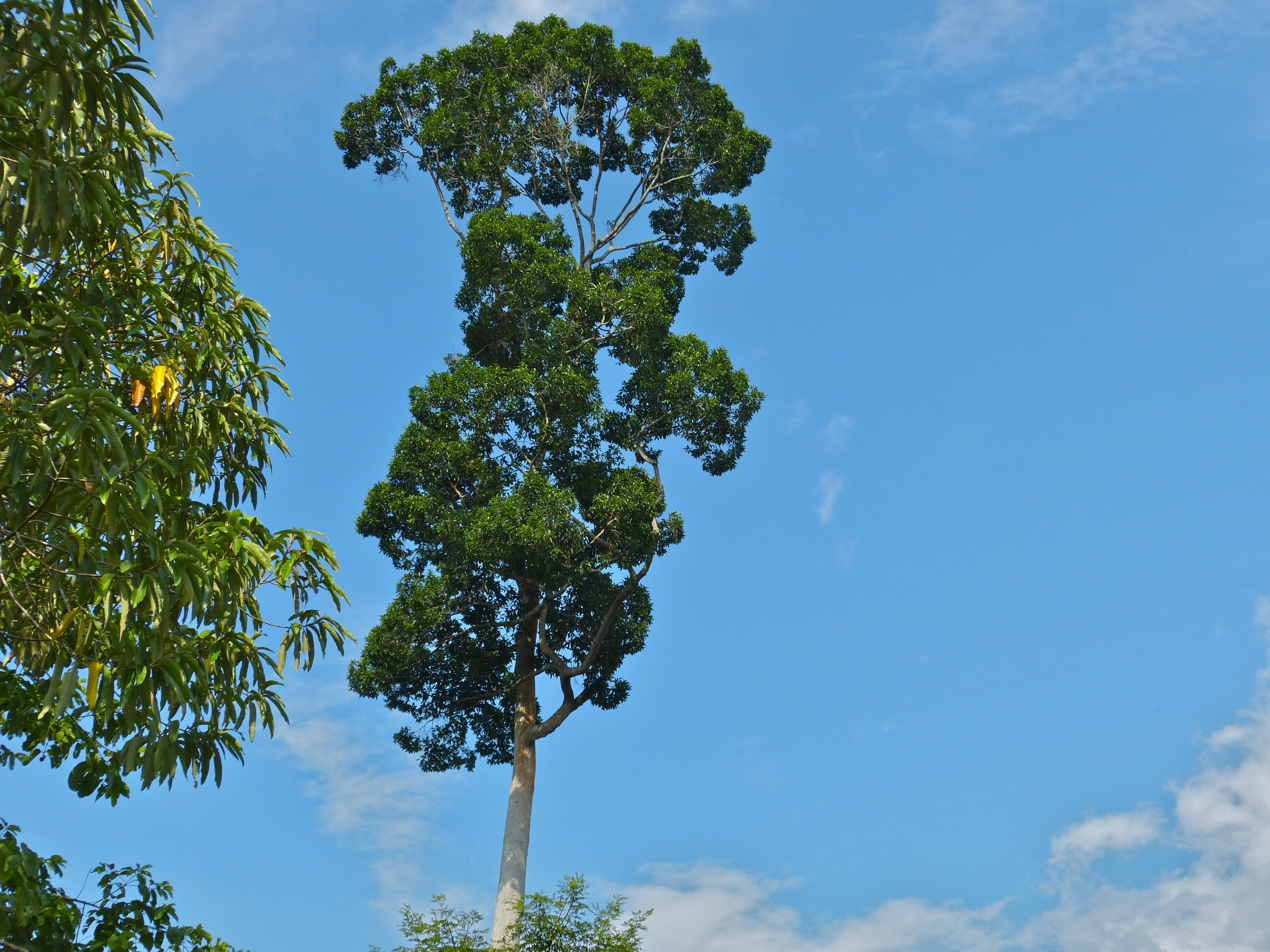

Scientific classification
- Kingdom: Plantae
- Clade: Tracheophytes
- Clade: Angiosperms
- Clade: Eudicots
- Clade: Rosids
- Order: Malvales
- Family: Dipterocarpaceae
- Tribe: Shoreae
- Genus: Parashorea; Kurz (1870)

Species
- See text

= Parashorea =

Genus of tropical trees

Parashorea is a genus of plant in family Dipterocarpaceae. The name Parashorea is derived from Greek (para = similar to) and refers to the genus similarity to Shorea. It contains about 14 species distributed from South Myanmar, Thailand, Indo-China and the southernmost parts of China to Sumatra, Borneo and the Philippines.

Parashorea trees have hard wood, can reach heights exceeding 70 metres, and have limbs reaching outward over ten metres. White seraya is a common name for several Parashorea species used in the timber trade.

== Species ==
14 species are accepted.

- Parashorea aptera Slooten
- Parashorea buchananii (C.E.C.Fisch.) Symington
- Parashorea chinensis Wang Hsie
- Parashorea densiflora Slooten & Symington
- Parashorea dussaudii Tardieu
- Parashorea globosa Symington
- Parashorea lucida (Miq.) Kurz
- Parashorea macrophylla Wyatt-Sm. ex P.S.Ashton
- Parashorea malaanonan (Blanco) Merr.
- Parashorea parvifolia Wyatt-Sm. ex P.S.Ashton
- Parashorea smythiesii Wyatt-Sm. ex P.S.Ashton
- Parashorea stellata Kurz
- Parashorea tomentella (Symington) Meijer
- Parashorea warburgii Brandis

== See also ==
- Dipterocarp timber classification
