= Bitukang Manok =

Bitukang Manok (transl. chicken intestines) may refer to the following:

- A nearly extinct river now known as Parian Creek, in Pasig, Philippines.
- A zigzag section of a road inside the Quezon Protected Landscape in Pagbilao, Quezon.
- A zigzag section of the Pan-Philippine Highway inside the Bicol Natural Park in Basud, Camarines Norte.
