= Parashorea lucida =

Conservation status
- Near Threatened (IUCN 3.1)

Scientific classification
- Kingdom: Plantae
- Clade: Tracheophytes
- Clade: Angiosperms
- Clade: Eudicots
- Clade: Rosids
- Order: Malvales
- Family: Dipterocarpaceae
- Genus: Parashorea
- Species: P. lucida

Binomial name
- Parashorea lucida (Miq.) Kurz

Synonyms
- Shorea lucida Miq.; Shorea subpeltata Miq.

Species of tree

Parashorea lucida (also called white meranti) is a species of flowering plant in the family Dipterocarpaceae. It is a tall emergent tree, up to 60 m tall, found in lowland and hill mixed dipterocarp forest on clay and clay soils. It native to Sumatra and to Sarawak in northwestern Borneo. It is threatened by habitat loss and logging for timber, and the IUCN Red List assesses the species as Near Threatened.

The species was first described as Shorea lucida by Friedrich Anton Wilhelm Miquel in 1861. The name lucida is derived from Latin (lucidus = clear) and refers to the venation on the leaf. In 1870 Wilhelm Sulpiz Kurz placed the species in genus Parashorea as P. lucida.
