= Bicol Natural Park =

Protected area in Bicol Region, Philippines

- IUCN category II (national park)
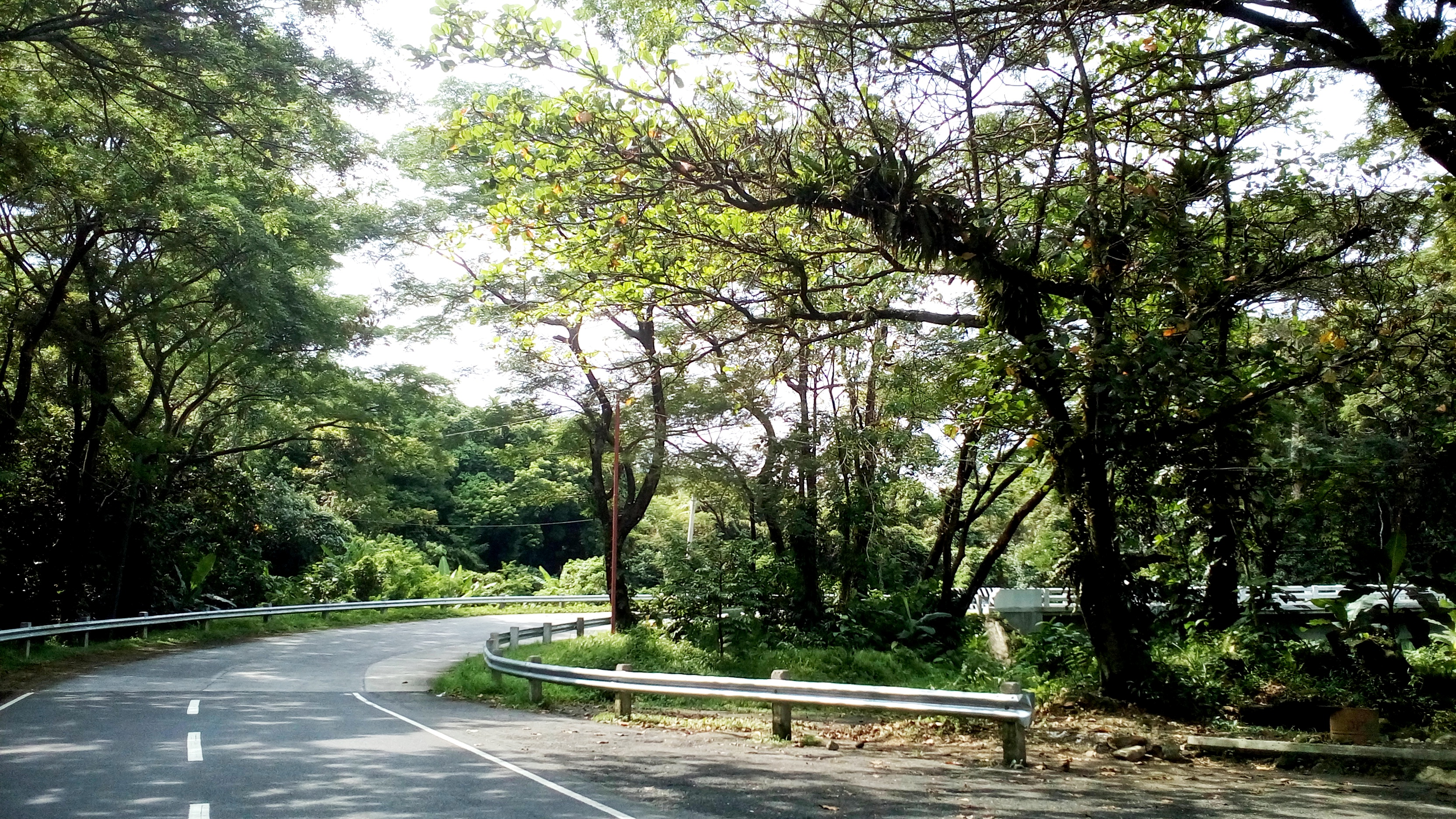
- The natural park along the Bitukang Manok portion of the Pan-Philippine Highway

- Location within Philippines Location within Luzon Location within Camarines Norte
- Location: Camarines Norte and Camarines Sur, Philippines
- Nearest city: Naga
- Coordinates: 13°55′32″N 122°58′17″E
- Area: 5,201 hectares (12,850 acres)
- Established: February 13, 1934 (National park); December 29, 2000 (Natural park)
- Governing body: Department of Environment and Natural Resources

The Bicol Natural Park is a protected area of the Philippines located in the Bicol Region of southern Luzon. It straddles the mountainous border between the provinces of Camarines Norte and Camarines Sur in the northern interior of the Bicol Peninsula. First declared as a national park covering 4,225 hectares (10,440 acres) on February 13, 1934, through Proclamation No. 657 of Governor General Frank Murphy, the Bicol National Park was later extended to its present area of 5,201 hectares (12,850 acres) through amendments made in Proclamation No. 655 signed by President Manuel Luis Quezon on December 23, 1940. The area was reclassified as a natural park on December 29, 2000, by virtue of Proclamation No. 43 by President Joseph Estrada.

== Geography ==
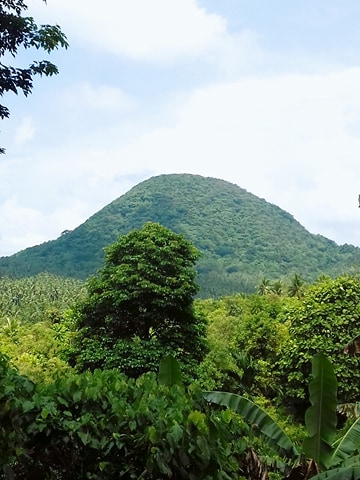
Mount Susong Dalaga in the Bicol Natural Park in Basud

The Bicol Natural Park spreads across the Camarines Norte municipalities of Basud and Mercedes, and the Camarines Sur municipalities of Sipocot and Lupi. It is situated at an elevation of 536 metres (1,759 ft) above sea level bordered by the Tuaca River to the north, the agricultural lands of Sipocot and Lupi to the south, the Tuaca and Pulantuna rivers to the west, and the forests of Mercedes to the east. Located some 330 kilometres (210 mi) southeast from Manila, the park is well known for its "EME" (from Imee Marcos's name), a winding road through the park that forms part of the Pan-Philippine Highway (N1/AH26) to Naga and Legazpi, the region's largest cities.

The park is crossed by five rivers and eleven creeks which empty into the Bicol River. It contains natural swimming pools, picnic areas, park and camping areas, natural trails, back country shelters, and botanical and zoological gardens. A few settlements also exist within the park's boundary with a population total of 9,802 in 1991, the largest being Tuaca and San Pascual in Basud, Tible, Aldezar & Banban in Sipocot, and Sooc, San Jose & Napolidan in Lupi.

== Biodiversity ==
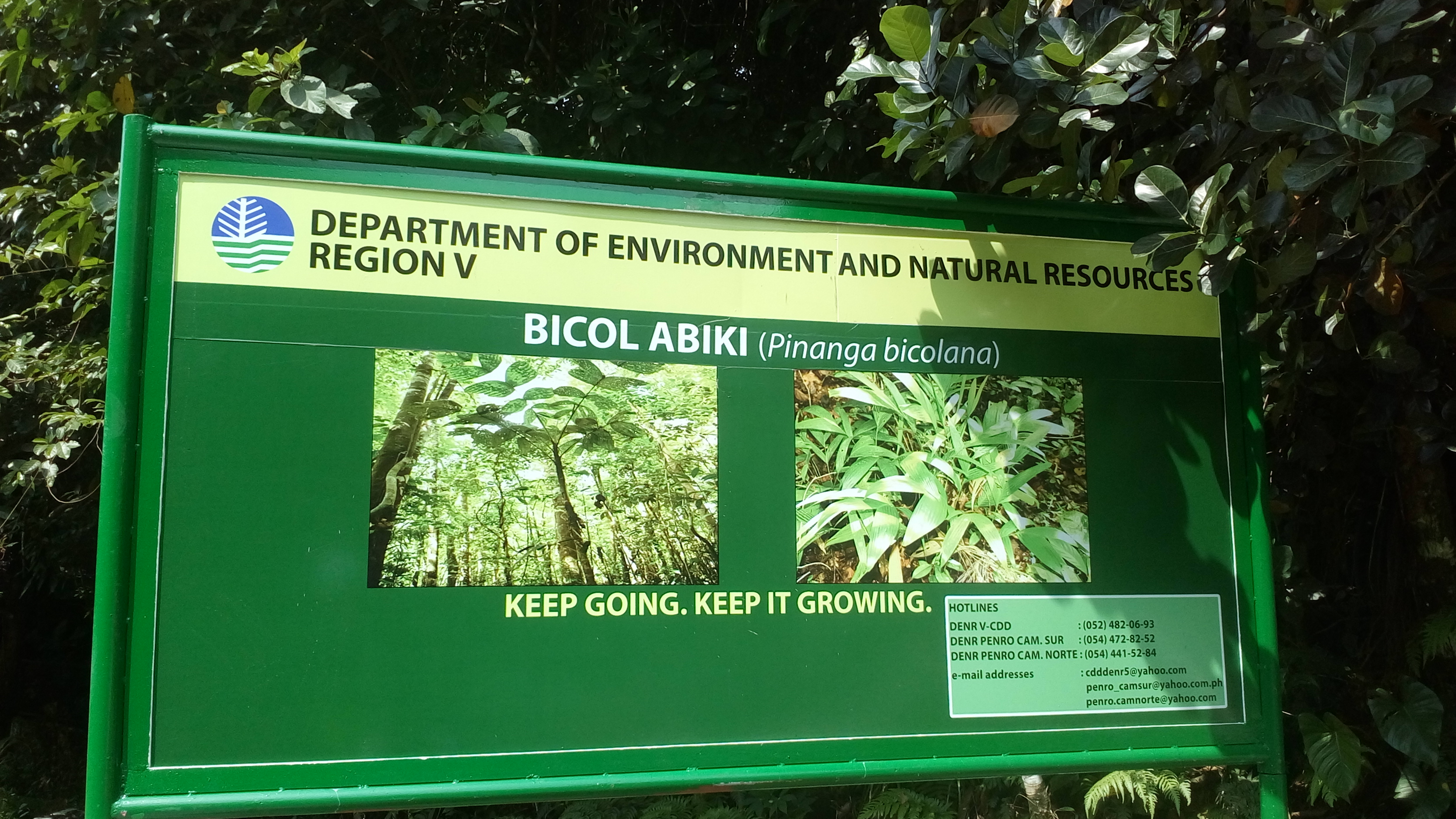
Bikol Abiki (Pinanga bicolana) signage

The park covers more than thirty percent of the total lowland rainforest area remaining in the Philippines. It is composed of 741 hectares (1,830 acres) of virgin forest, 1,321 hectares (3,260 acres) of residual forest and 412 hectares (1,020 acres) of planted forest. The park is dominated by apitong trees, as well as yakal, white lauan, bagtikan, guijo, dalingdingan, hagakhak, narig, and red lauan. It also supports palm tree species such as kaong, Albert palm, bamboo palm and anahaw. Other flora found in the park are kamagong, molave, dita, magabuyo, malaikmo, almaciga, heart leaf, hauili, balobo, catmon, malugai and tibig.

The National Museum also documented the following wildlife species in 1991: the Philippine forest rat, Geoffroy's rousette, Malay civet, palm civet, Philippine dawn bat, Philippine long-tailed macaque, red junglefowl, king quail, brahminy kite, green imperial pigeon, eastern grass owl, black-naped oriole, snowy egret, South American cane toad, giant Visayan frog, Tokay gecko, and several species of snakes and lizards.

== Threats ==
The Bicol Natural Park faces threats from illegal logging, firewood collection, charcoal production and human encroachment. In 1992, with the passage of the National Integrated Protected Areas System Act (NIPAS), a total of 738 families were evicted from the park and were transferred to resettlement sites in Labo and Camarines Sur. Their houses, located mostly along the highway, were demolished and their agricultural crops and farms abandoned. However, according to a 2009 report from the Department of International Development of the United Kingdom, illegal practices and settlement still exist and only 7.6 square kilometres (2.9 sq mi) of the park's forest cover remains. In 2013, the Department of Environment and Natural Resources for the Bicol Region ordered the park's closure to human activities with a total log ban and anti-illegal logging task force set up as part of the government's National Greening Program. The program also aims to plant 1.5 billion trees from 2011 to 2016.

== Accessibility ==
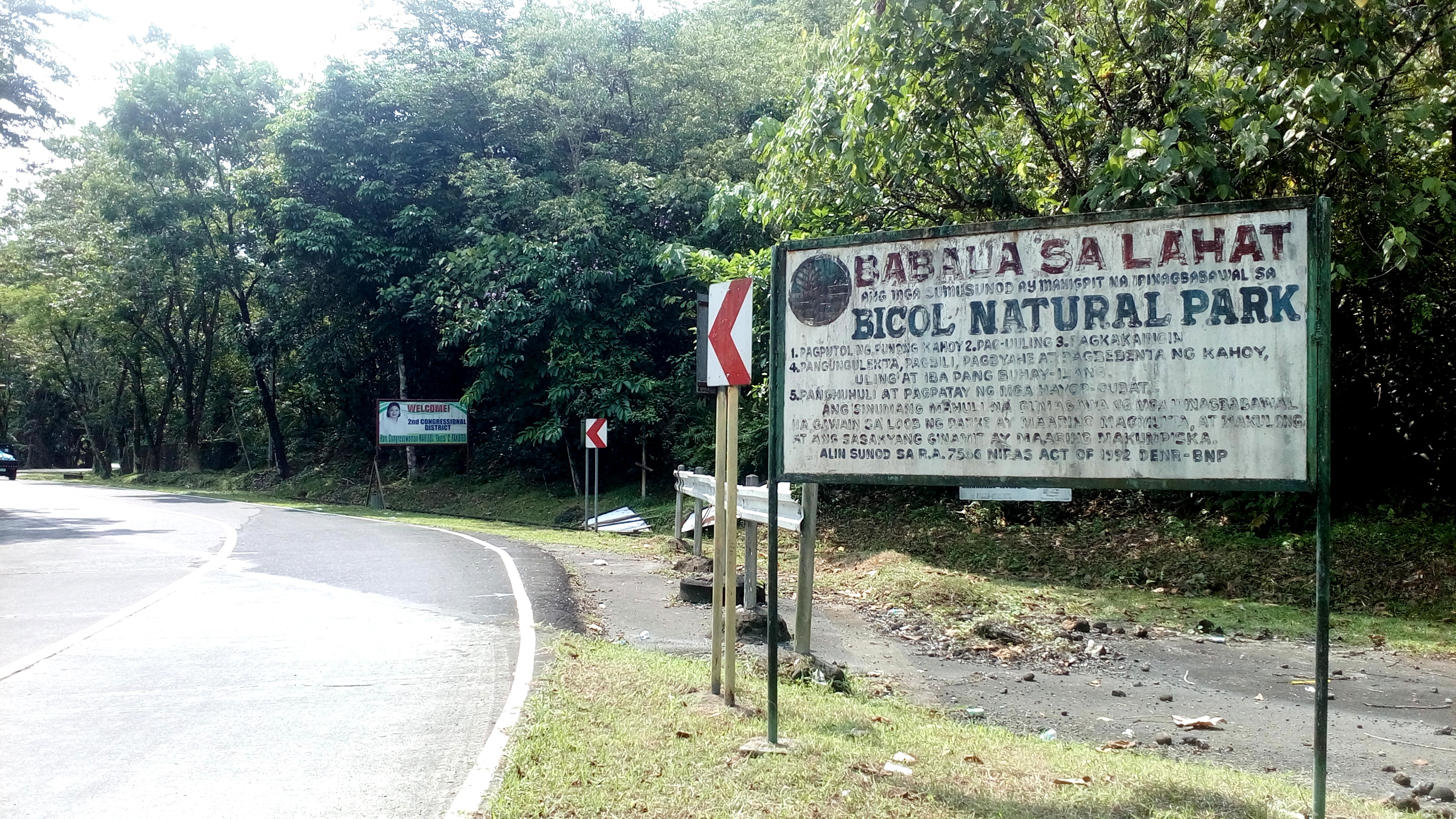
A park signage installed by the DENR

The park is easily accessible from the Pan-Philippine Highway (AH26) that runs through the middle of the park. Before Andaya Highway was opened in 2003, this was the main highway that connected Manila to Naga and Legazpi as well as the Visayas and Mindanao passing through Daet and other coastal Camarines Norte municipalities. The park is 46 kilometres (29 mi) north from the Naga Airport and some 18 kilometres (11 mi) south from Daet and Bagasbas Airport.

== See also ==
- Luzon rainforest
- List of natural parks of the Philippines
