= Parashorea dussaudii =

Conservation status
- Data Deficient (IUCN 3.1)

Scientific classification
- Kingdom: Plantae
- Clade: Tracheophytes
- Clade: Angiosperms
- Clade: Eudicots
- Clade: Rosids
- Order: Malvales
- Family: Dipterocarpaceae
- Genus: Parashorea
- Species: P. dussaudii

Binomial name
- Parashorea dussaudii Tardieu

Species of flowering plant

Parashorea dussaudii is a species of flowering plant in the family Dipterocarpaceae. It is a tree native to Laos and Myanmar. Little is known about the species' population and habitat.
