= Parashorea stellata =

Conservation status
- Vulnerable (IUCN 3.1)

Scientific classification
- Kingdom: Plantae
- Clade: Tracheophytes
- Clade: Angiosperms
- Clade: Eudicots
- Clade: Rosids
- Order: Malvales
- Family: Dipterocarpaceae
- Genus: Parashorea
- Species: P. stellata

Binomial name
- Parashorea stellata Kurz

Synonyms
- Parashorea poilanei Tardieu; Shorea cinerea C.E.C.Fisch.; Shorea stellata (Kurz) Dyer

Species of tree

Parashorea stellata (also called white seraya) is a species of tree in the family Dipterocarpaceae. It grows naturally in Laos, Peninsular Malaysia, Myanmar, Thailand, and Vietnam. It is threatened by habitat loss.
