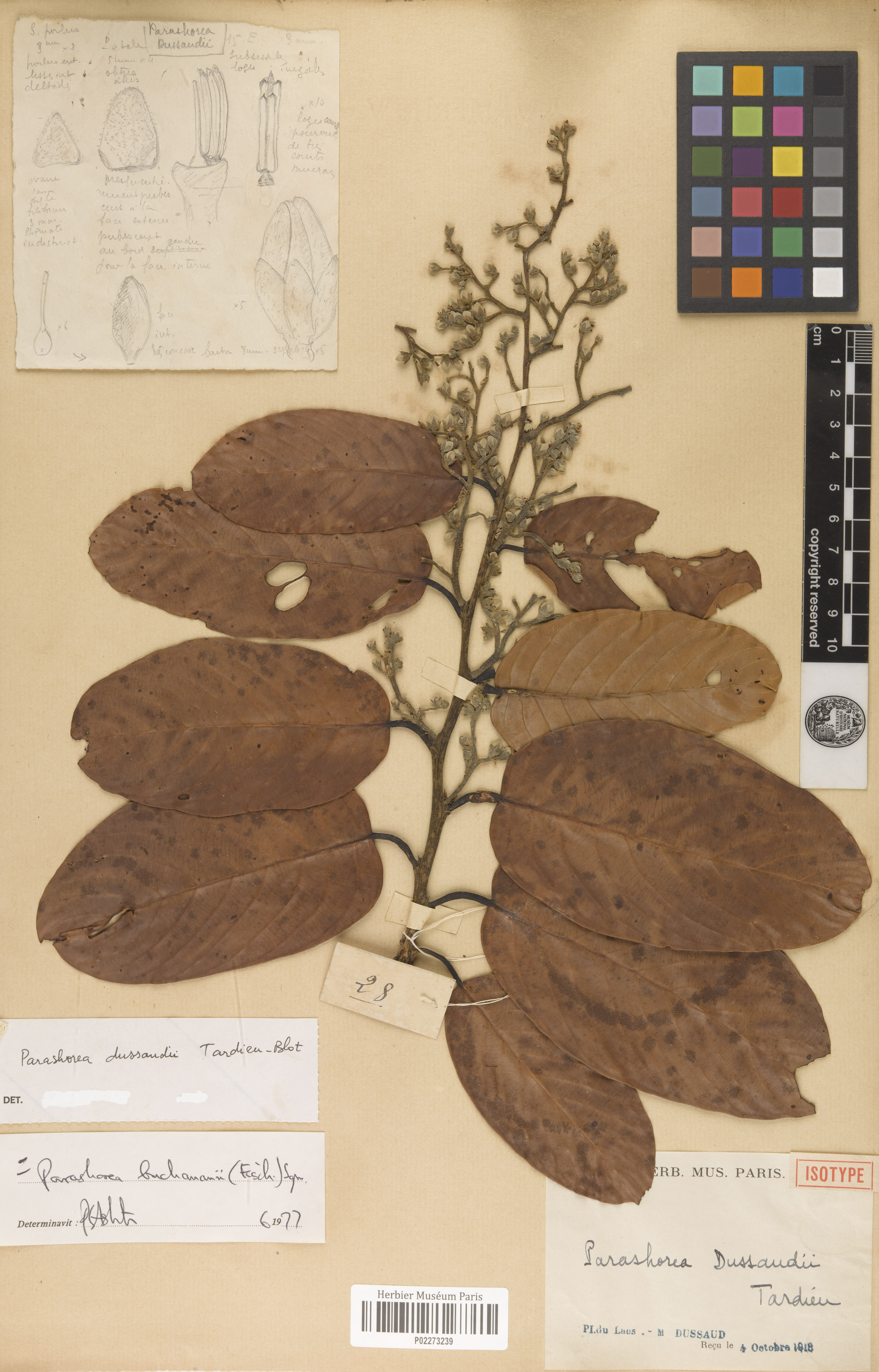

Conservation status
- Data Deficient (IUCN 3.1)

Scientific classification
- Kingdom: Plantae
- Clade: Tracheophytes
- Clade: Angiosperms
- Clade: Eudicots
- Clade: Rosids
- Order: Malvales
- Family: Dipterocarpaceae
- Genus: Parashorea
- Species: P. buchananii

Binomial name
- Parashorea buchananii (C.E.C.Fisch.) Symington

Synonyms
- Shorea buchananii C.E.C.Fisch.

= Parashorea buchananii =

Species of flowering plant

Parashorea buchananii is a species of flowering plant in the family Dipterocarpaceae. It is a tree native to Laos and Myanmar.

The species was first described as Shorea buchananii by Cecil Ernest Claude Fischer in 1926. In 1939 Colin Fraser Symington placed the species in genus Parashorea as P. buchananii.
