= Parashorea warburgii =

Conservation status
- Critically Endangered (IUCN 3.1)

Scientific classification
- Kingdom: Plantae
- Clade: Embryophytes
- Clade: Tracheophytes
- Clade: Angiosperms
- Clade: Eudicots
- Clade: Rosids
- Order: Malvales
- Family: Dipterocarpaceae
- Genus: Parashorea
- Species: P. warburgii

Binomial name
- Parashorea warburgii Brandis

Species of flowering plant

Parashorea warburgii is a species of flowering plant in the family Dipterocarpaceae. It is a tree endemic to the island of Mindanao in the Philippines. It is native to lowland rain forest below 1,200 meters (3,900 ft) elevation. The species has a limited range, with an estimated extent of occurrence (EOO) and area of occupancy (AOO) of 8 km^{2} (3.1 sq mi). It is threatened with habitat loss from timber harvesting and conversion of forests to agriculture, and the IUCN assesses the species as critically endangered.

The species was first described by Dietrich Brandis in 1895.
