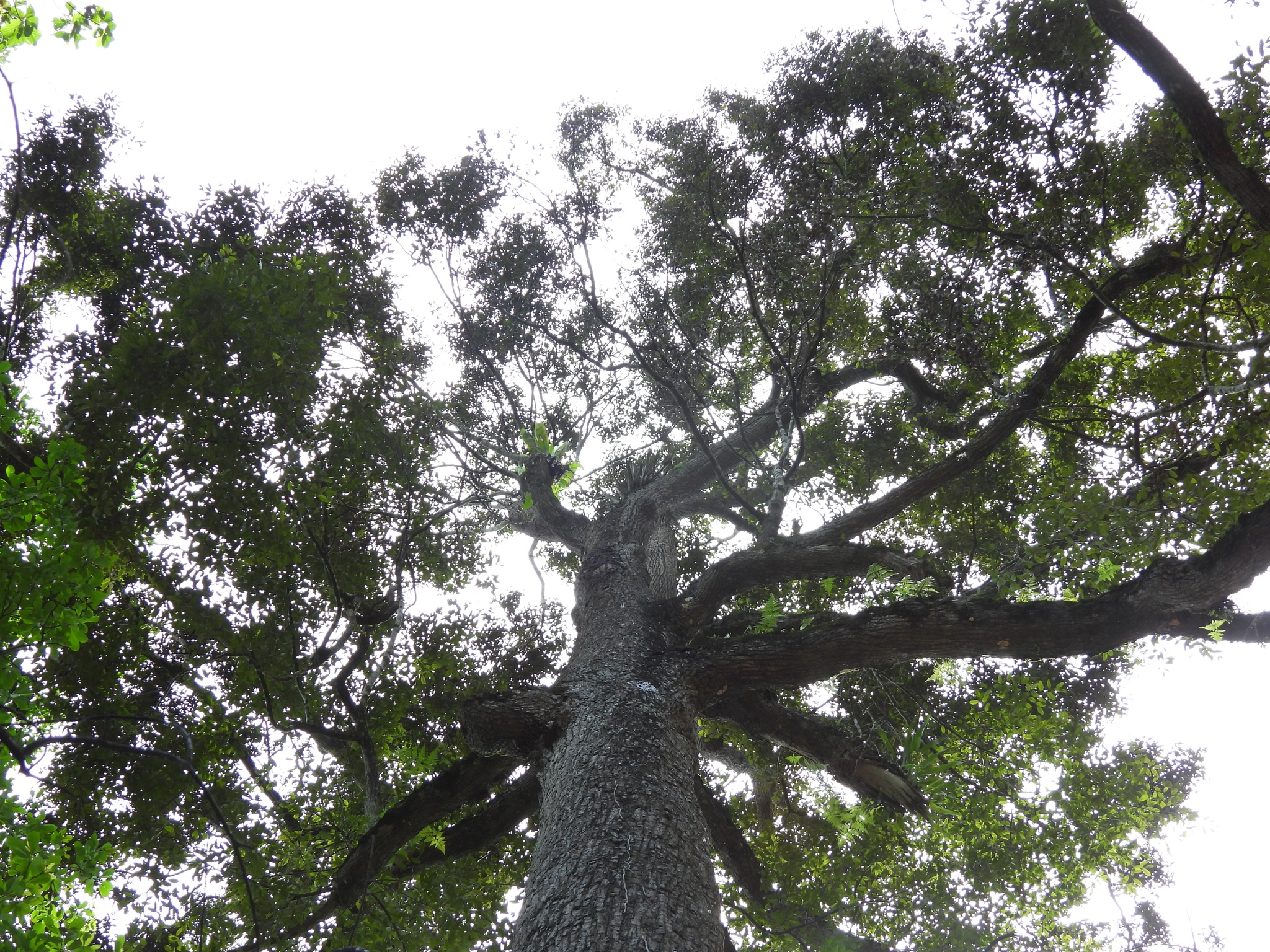
- In Selangor, Malaysia

Conservation status
- Near Threatened (IUCN 3.1)

Scientific classification
- Kingdom: Plantae
- Clade: Tracheophytes
- Clade: Angiosperms
- Clade: Eudicots
- Clade: Rosids
- Order: Malvales
- Family: Dipterocarpaceae
- Genus: Parashorea
- Species: P. densiflora

Binomial name
- Parashorea densiflora Slooten & Symington

Subspecies
- Parashorea densiflora subsp. densiflora; Parashorea densiflora subsp. kerrii (Tardieu) Pooma

Synonyms
- Synonyms of subsp. kerrii: Parashorea kerrii Tardieu

= Parashorea densiflora =

Species of tree

Parashorea densiflora (also called white seraya) is a species of flowering plant in the family Dipterocarpaceae. It is a tree native to Laos, Thailand, and Peninsular Malaysia. It grows up to 40 m (130 ft) tall. It flowers in March to April and fruits from May to December.

Two subspecies are accepted.

- Parashorea densiflora subsp. densiflora – native to Peninsular Malaysia, in the states of Johor, Negeri Sembilan, Pahang, Perak, Selangor and Terengganu. It grows in lowland and hill mixed dipterocarp rain forest.
- Parashorea densiflora subsp. kerrii (Tardieu) Pooma – native to northeastern Thailand and Laos. It grows in lowland dry evergreen forest on stony soils near streams.
