= Mang Yang district =

Coordinates: 14.000°N 108.250°E

Mang Yang district Huyện Mang Yang
- District
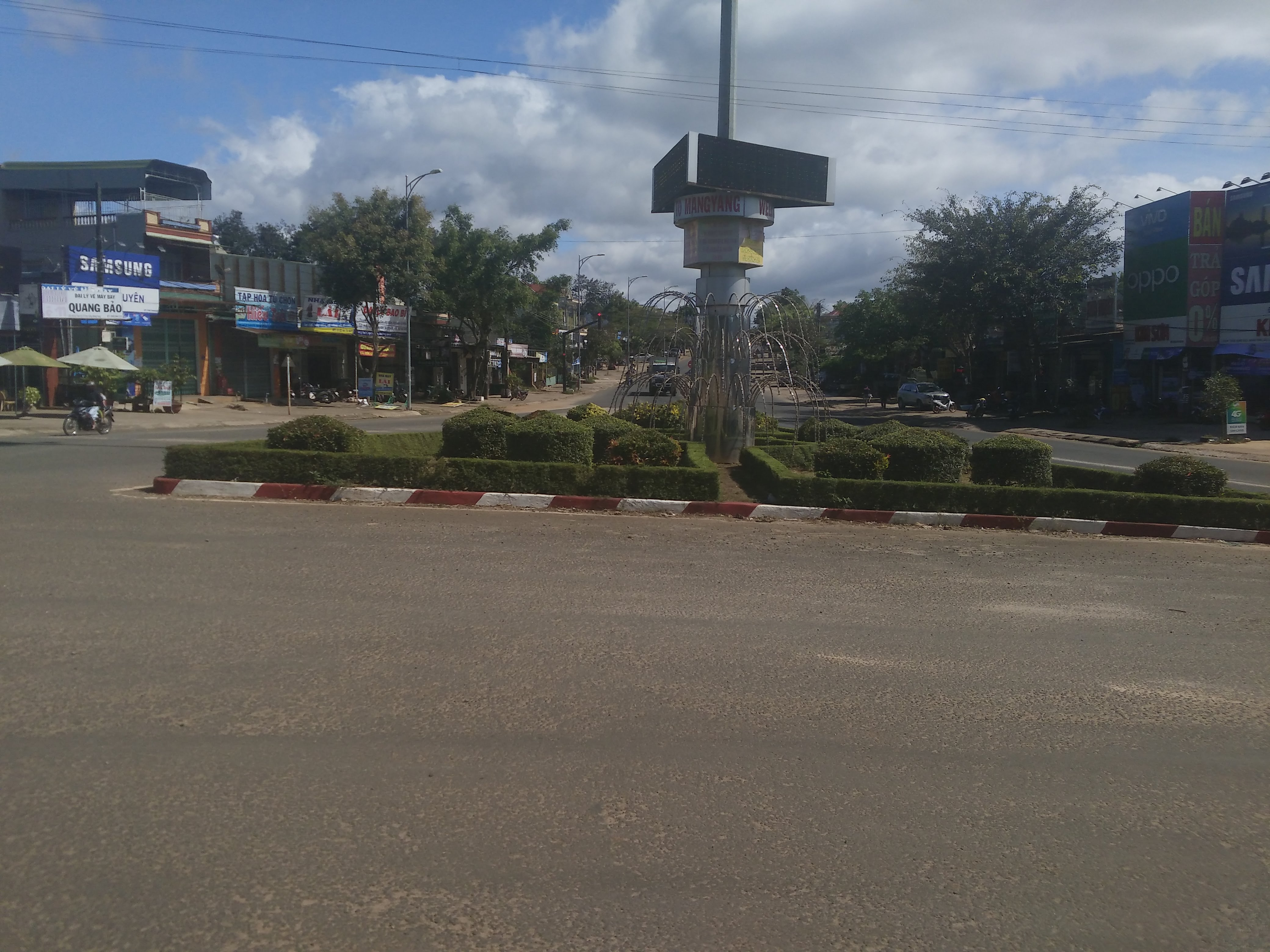

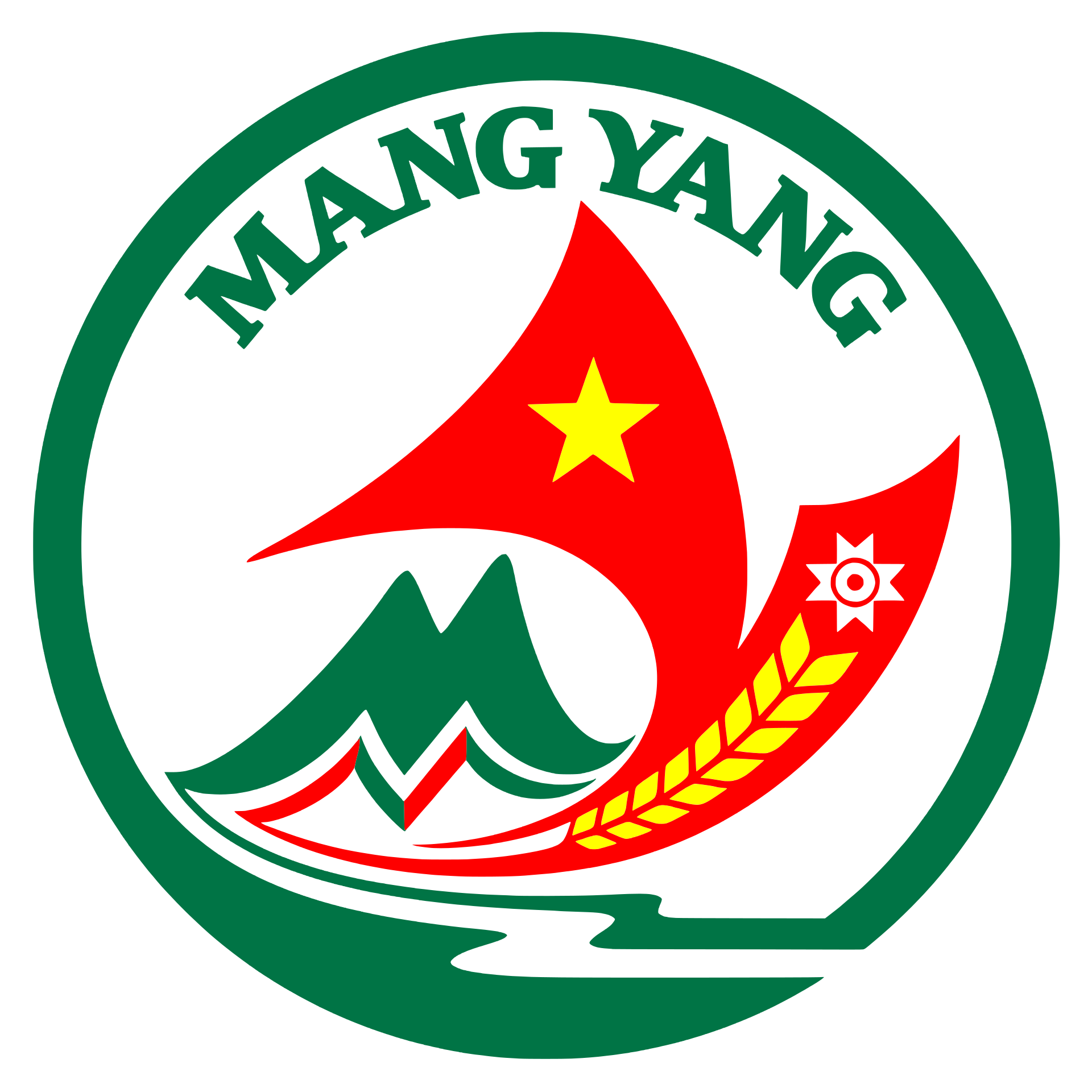
- Seal

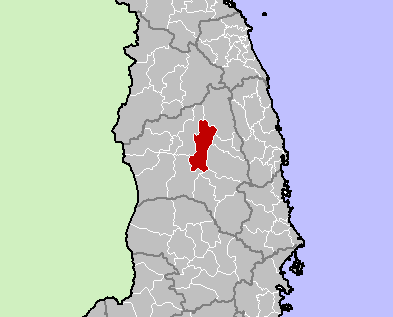
- Location in Gia Lai province
- Country: Vietnam
- Region: Central Highlands
- Province: Gia Lai province
- Capital: Kon Dơng

Area
  - Total: 434.90 sq mi (1,126.39 km^{2})

Population (31/12/2024)
  - Total: 84,986
  - Density: 195.41/sq mi (75.450/km^{2})
- Time zone: UTC+7 (Indochina Time)

Mang Yang (Vietnamese: Mang Yang) is a former district (huyện) of Gia Lai province in the Central Highlands region of Vietnam.

As of 2024 the district had a population of 84,986. The district covers an area of 1,126.39 km². The district capital lies at Kon Dơng. In 1954, at the end of the First Indochina War, Mang Yang was the site of a bloody battle won by the Viet Minh.
