= Parashorea aptera =

Conservation status
- Endangered (IUCN 3.1)

Scientific classification
- Kingdom: Plantae
- Clade: Tracheophytes
- Clade: Angiosperms
- Clade: Eudicots
- Clade: Rosids
- Order: Malvales
- Family: Dipterocarpaceae
- Genus: Parashorea
- Species: P. aptera

Binomial name
- Parashorea aptera Slooten

Species of tree

Parashorea aptera is a species of plant in the family Dipterocarpaceae. It is a tree endemic to Sumatra, where it grows in lowland rain forest from 6 to 350 meters elevation. It is threatened by habitat loss from deforestation and expansion of agriculture and plantations, and from timber logging, and the IUCN Red List assesses the species as Endangered.

The species was first described by Dirk Fok van Slooten in 1927.
