= Parashorea smythiesii =

Conservation status
- Data Deficient (IUCN 3.1)

Scientific classification
- Kingdom: Plantae
- Clade: Tracheophytes
- Clade: Angiosperms
- Clade: Eudicots
- Clade: Rosids
- Order: Malvales
- Family: Dipterocarpaceae
- Genus: Parashorea
- Species: P. smythiesii

Binomial name
- Parashorea smythiesii Wyatt-Sm. ex P.S.Ashton

Species of tree

Parashorea smythiesii is a species of plant in the family Dipterocarpaceae. It is endemic to Borneo (Brunei, Sabah, Sarawak, and east Kalimantan). It is a large emergent tree, up to 55 m tall, found in mixed and upper dipterocarp forests on fertile clay soils. It is found in some protected areas.

Parashorea smythiesii was named after Bertram Evelyn Smythies.
