= Parashorea tomentella =

Conservation status
- Least Concern (IUCN 3.1)

Scientific classification
- Kingdom: Plantae
- Clade: Tracheophytes
- Clade: Angiosperms
- Clade: Eudicots
- Clade: Rosids
- Order: Malvales
- Family: Dipterocarpaceae
- Genus: Parashorea
- Species: P. tomentella

Binomial name
- Parashorea tomentella (Symington) Meijer

Synonyms
- Parashorea malaanonan (Blanco) Merr. var. tomentella Symington

Species of tree

Parashorea tomentella is a species of plant in the family Dipterocarpaceae. It is endemic to eastern Borneo (Sabah and east Kalimantan). It is a large emergent tree, up to 65 m tall, found in lowland dipterocarp forests on fertile clay soils. It is a light hardwood sold under the trade names of White Lauan or White Seraya. It is found in forest reserves on the east coast of Sabah.
