= Parashorea parvifolia =

Conservation status
- Least Concern (IUCN 3.1)

Scientific classification
- Kingdom: Plantae
- Clade: Tracheophytes
- Clade: Angiosperms
- Clade: Eudicots
- Clade: Rosids
- Order: Malvales
- Family: Dipterocarpaceae
- Genus: Parashorea
- Species: P. parvifolia

Binomial name
- Parashorea parvifolia Wyatt-Sm. ex P.S.Ashton

Species of tree

Parashorea parvifolia is a species of plant in the family Dipterocarpaceae. The name parvifolia is derived from Latin (parvus = small and folia = leaf) and refers to species small leaves (6-9 x 3–4.5 cm). It is endemic to Borneo (Brunei, Sabah, Sarawak and east Kalimantan). It is a large emergent tree, up to 60 m tall, found in mixed dipterocarp forests on fertile clay soils. It is present in protected areas, including Lambir Hills National Park.
