= Parashorea globosa =

Conservation status
- Critically Endangered (IUCN 3.1)

Scientific classification
- Kingdom: Plantae
- Clade: Tracheophytes
- Clade: Angiosperms
- Clade: Eudicots
- Clade: Rosids
- Order: Malvales
- Family: Dipterocarpaceae
- Genus: Parashorea
- Species: P. globosa

Binomial name
- Parashorea globosa Symington

Species of tree

Parashorea globosa (also called white seraya) is a species of flowering plant in the family Dipterocarpaceae. It is a tree native to Sumatra (Indonesia) and Peninsular Malaysia (Malaysia). It is known from two locations growing in lowland dipterocarp rain forest.

The species was described in 1939 by Colin Fraser Symington.
