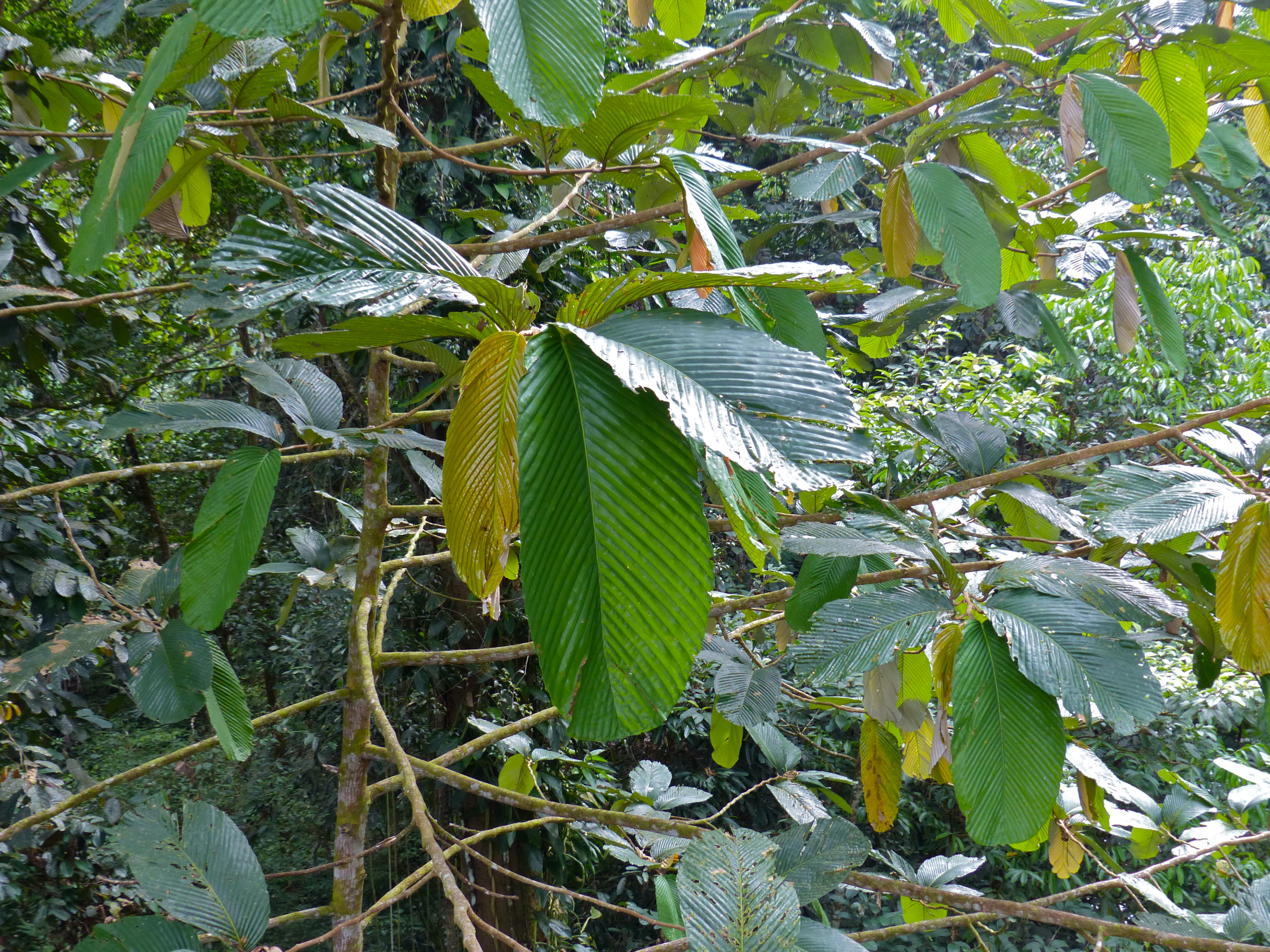

Conservation status
- Near Threatened (IUCN 3.1)

Scientific classification
- Kingdom: Plantae
- Clade: Tracheophytes
- Clade: Angiosperms
- Clade: Eudicots
- Clade: Rosids
- Order: Malvales
- Family: Dipterocarpaceae
- Genus: Parashorea
- Species: P. macrophylla

Binomial name
- Parashorea macrophylla Wyatt-Sm. ex P.S.Ashton

= Parashorea macrophylla =

Species of tree

Parashorea macrophylla is a species of flowering plant in the family Dipterocarpaceae. It a tree endemic to Borneo, where it is native to Brunei, Sarawak, and West Kalimantan. The name macrophylla is derived from Greek (makros = big and phullon = leaf) and refers to the species extremely large leaves (30-50 x 16–24 cm). It is a large evergreen tree, which can grow up to 50 metres tall with a bole up to 100 cm in diameter. It grows in lowland mixed dipterocarp rain forest, often in periodically flooded riverine areas, up to 300 metres elevation. The timber is sold under the trade name of white lauan or white seraya. It occurs in protected areas in Sarawak but elsewhere it is threatened by habitat loss.
