= Dalbergia annamensis =

Conservation status
- Endangered (IUCN 3.1)

Scientific classification
- Kingdom: Plantae
- Clade: Tracheophytes
- Clade: Angiosperms
- Clade: Eudicots
- Clade: Rosids
- Order: Fabales
- Family: Fabaceae
- Subfamily: Faboideae
- Genus: Dalbergia
- Species: D. annamensis

Binomial name
- Dalbergia annamensis A. Chev.

Species of legume

Dalbergia annamensis is a species of legume in the family Fabaceae. It is found only in Vietnam. It is threatened by habitat loss and Agent Orange.
