= Mù Cang Chải =

- Commune
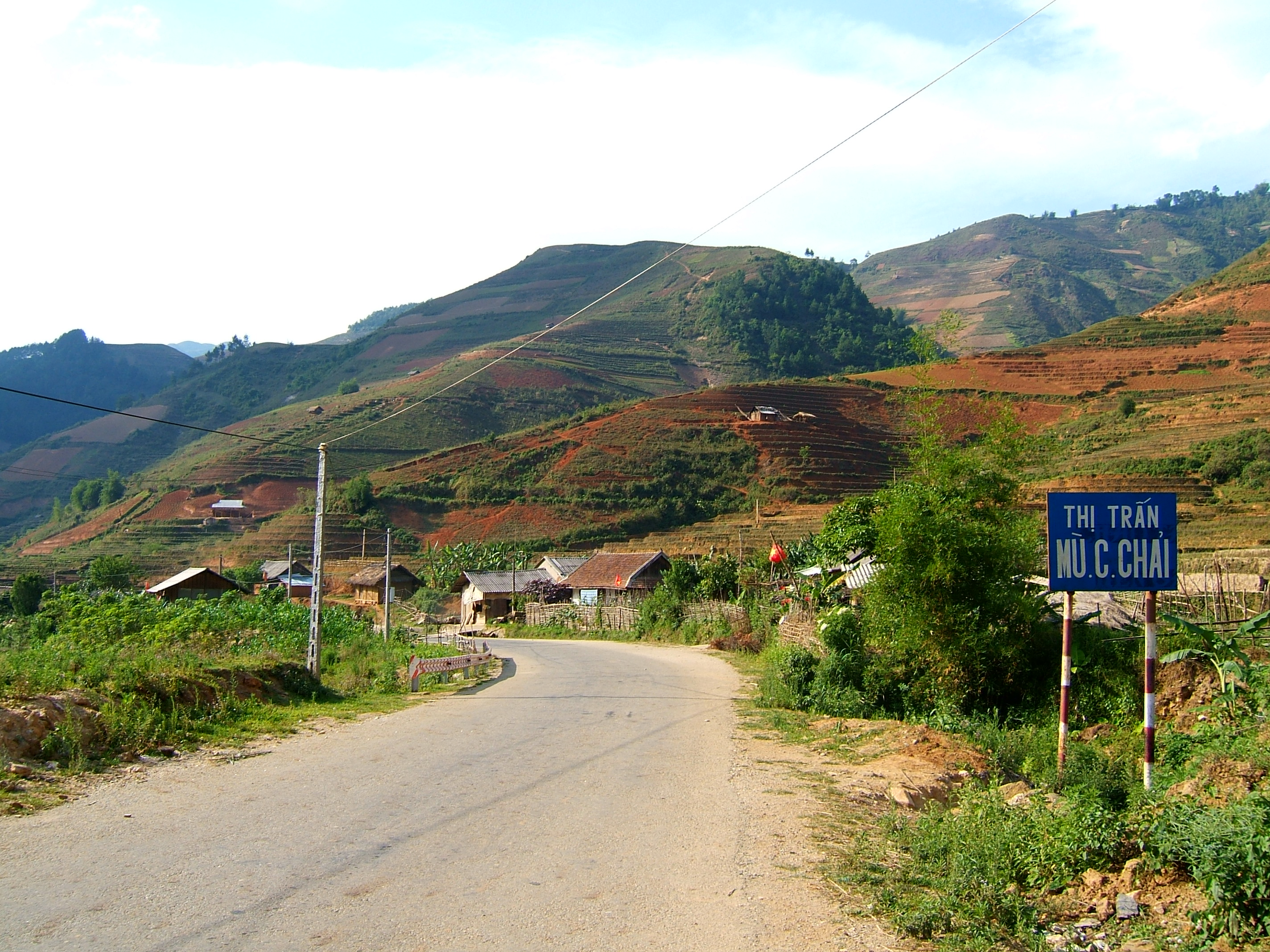

- Location within Vietnam
- Coordinates: 21°50′49″N 104°5′30″E
- Country: Vietnam
- Region: Northeast
- Province: Lào Cai

Area
  - Total: 2.724 sq mi (7.056 km^{2})

Population (2009)
  - Total: 2,459
- Time zone: UTC+7 (UTC + 7)

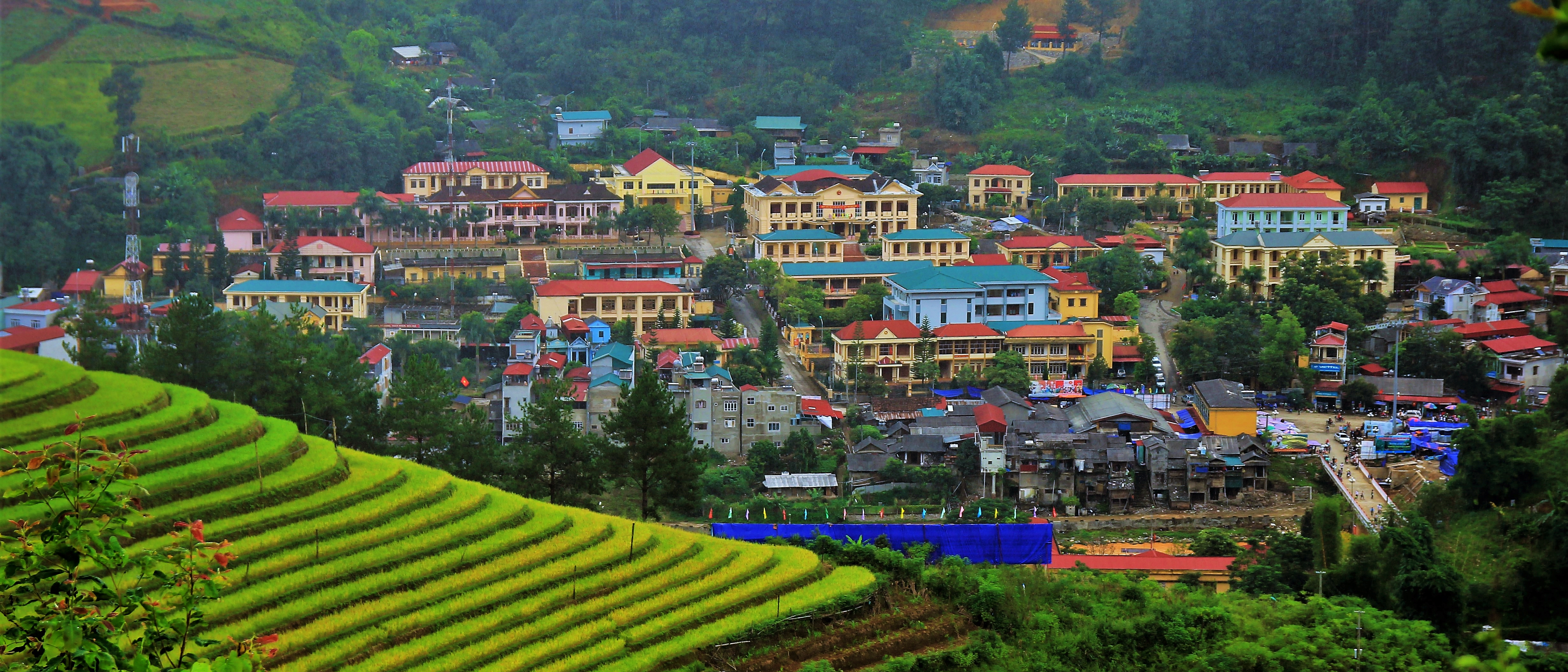
Mu Cang Chai Town

Mù Cang Chải is a commune of Lào Cai Province, in the northeastern region of Vietnam.
