= Mang Yang =

Mang Yang Xã Mang Yang
- Commune
- Mang Yang commune
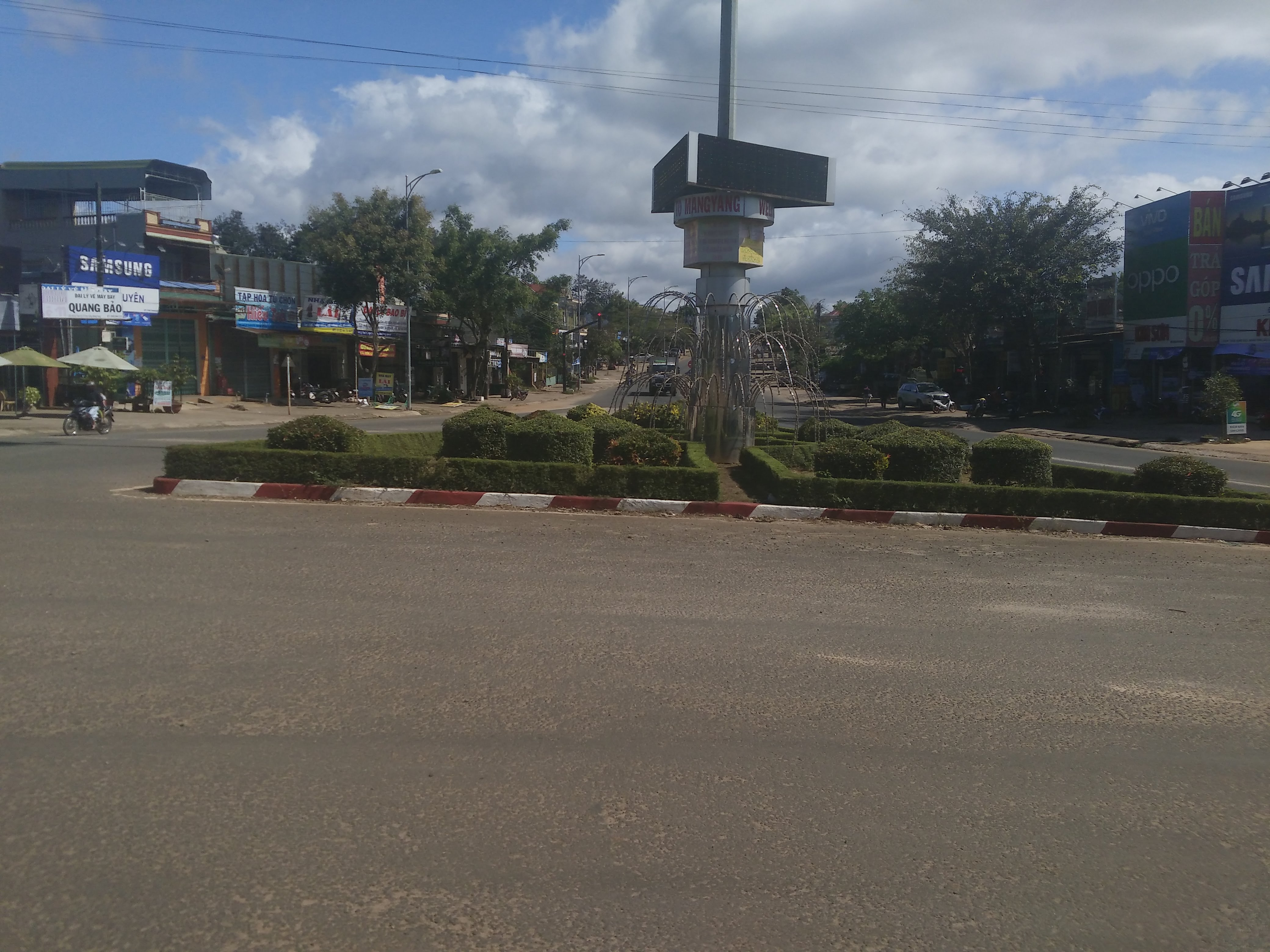
- Kon Dơng Crossroad

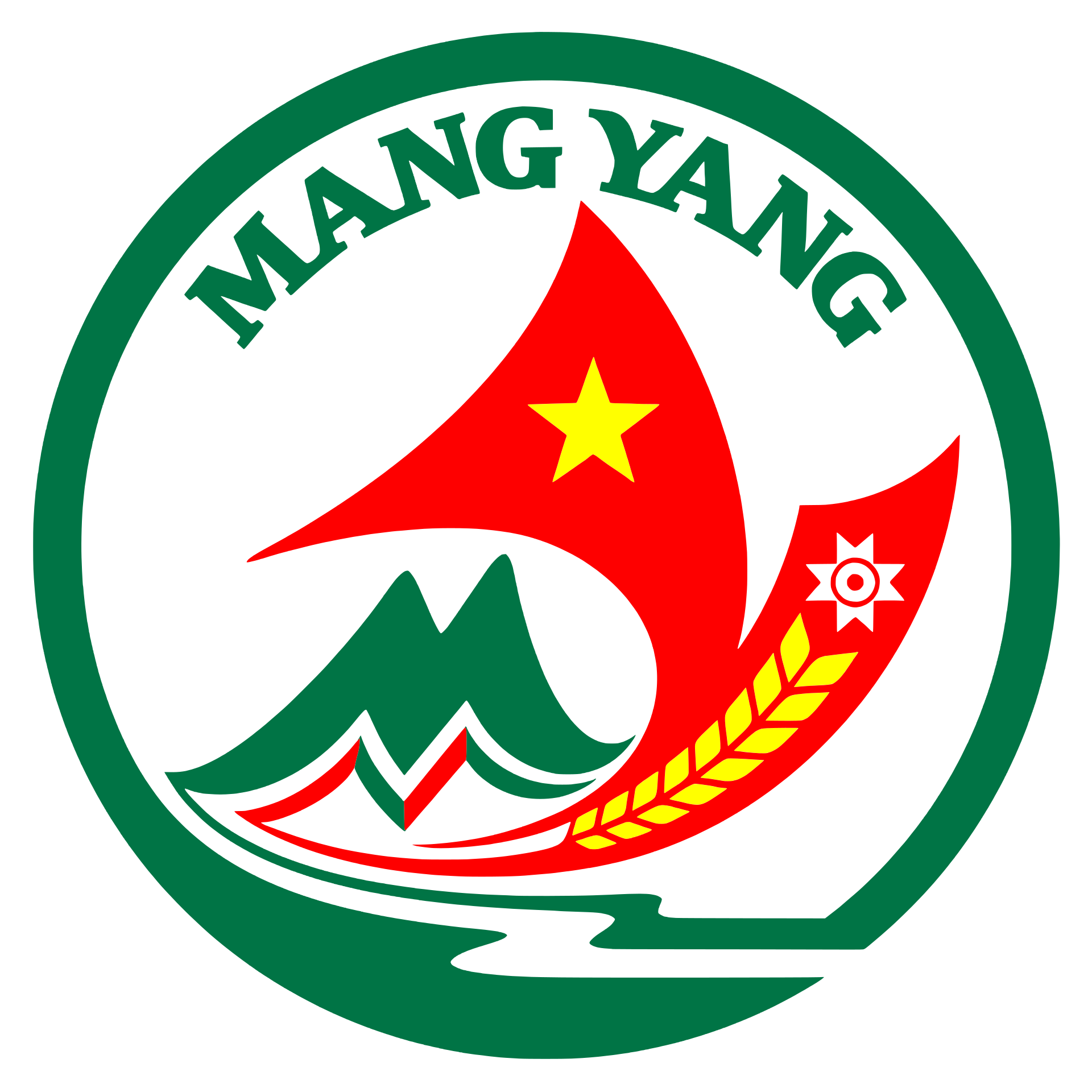
- Seal

- Location within Vietnam
- Coordinates: 14°02′34″N 108°15′17″E
- Country: Vietnam
- Region: Central Highlands
- Province: Gia Lai
- Established: 2025
- Seat: 04 Tran Phu Road

Area
  - Total: 6,702 sq mi (17,359 km^{2})

Population (31/12/2024)
  - Total: 30,302
  - Density: 450/sq mi (174/km^{2})
- Time zone: UTC+7 (UTC + 7)
- Area code: 23794

Mang Yang is a commune (xã) of Gia Lai Province, Vietnam. It is one of the 135 new wards and communes of the province following the reorganization in 2025.

On June 16, 2025, the Standing Committee of the National Assembly issued Resolution No. 1660/NQ-UBTVQH15 on the reorganization of commune-level administrative units in Gia Lai Province in 2025 (the resolution took effect on the date of its adoption). Accordingly, the entire natural area and population of Kon Dơng Township and the communes of Đăk Yă, Đak Djrăng, and Hải Yang were consolidated to establish a new commune named Mang Yang Commune.
