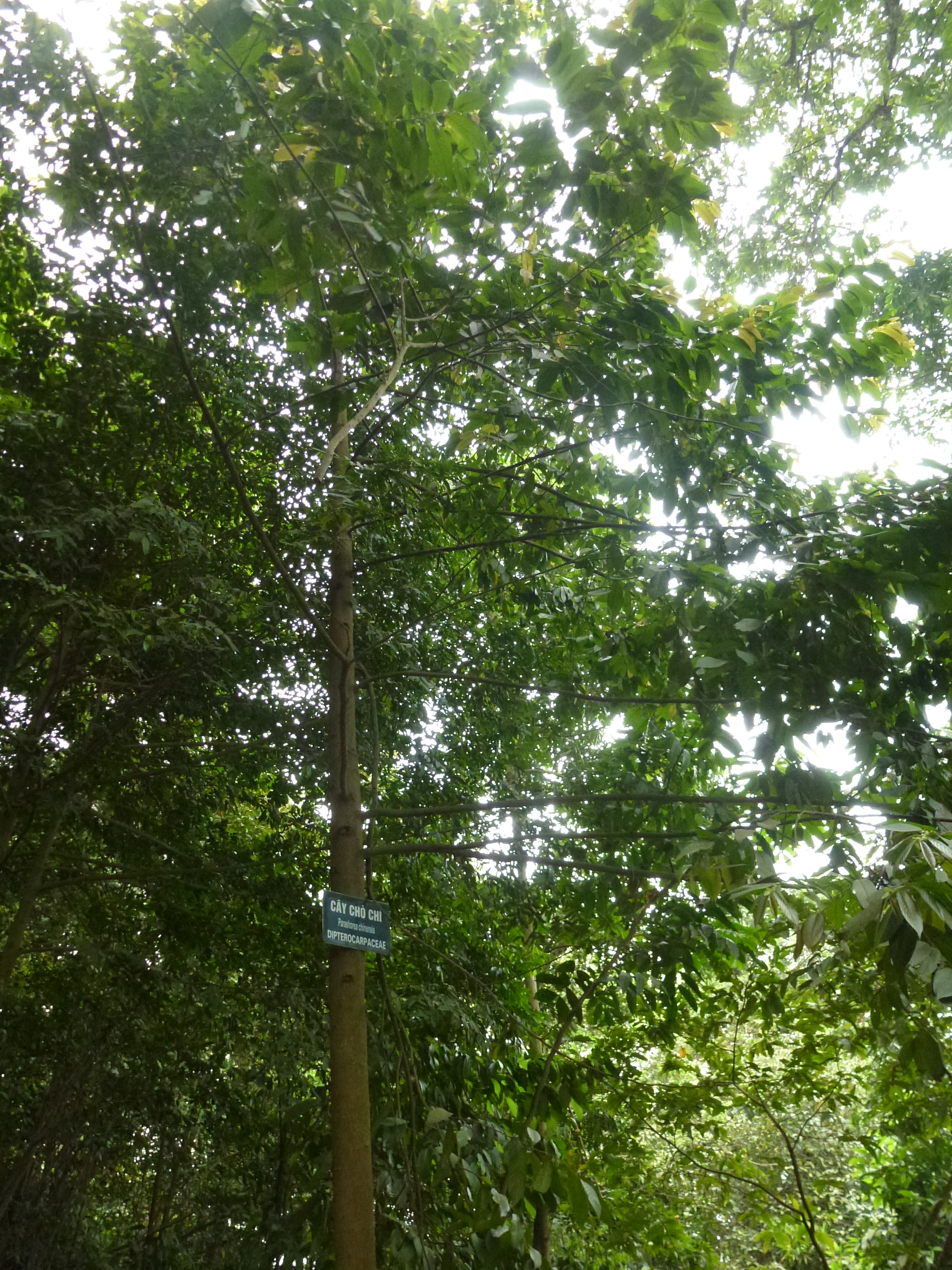

Conservation status
- Endangered (IUCN 3.1)

Scientific classification
- Kingdom: Plantae
- Clade: Tracheophytes
- Clade: Angiosperms
- Clade: Eudicots
- Clade: Rosids
- Order: Malvales
- Family: Dipterocarpaceae
- Genus: Parashorea
- Species: P. chinensis

Binomial name
- Parashorea chinensis Wang Hsie (1977)

Synonyms
- Parashorea chinensis var. kwangsiensis Lin Chi (1977); Shorea chinensis (Wang Hsie) H.Zhu (1992), nom. illeg., non Merr. 1922; Shorea wangtianshuea Y.K.Yang & J.K.Wu (1994); Shorea wangtianshuea var. kwangsiensis (Lin Chi) Y.K.Yang & J.K.Wu (2002); Shorea wangtianshuea subsp. vietnamensis Y.K.Yang & J.K.Wu (2002)

= Parashorea chinensis =

Species of tree

Parashorea chinensis, photographed in Wangtianshu Scenic Area, Xishuangbanna Tropical Rainforest National Park. The rope bridge is called the "canopy walkway". It was originally used for scientific research and has been transformed into a tourist attraction. People shown in the picture are tourists. Plants are not shown in their entirety.

Parashorea chinensis is a large species of tree (40–72 m tall) in the family Dipterocarpaceae. It is native to southern China (Yunnan and Guangxi provinces) and in northern Laos and Vietnam. It is threatened by habitat loss. The species is under first-class national protection in China.

The tallest reliably measured individual published in journals is a 72.4 m approximately 150 year-old tree found in a Karst sinkhole within the seasonal tropical rainforest of Nonggang National Natural Reserve in Chongzuo, Guangxi province.
