= Wilhelm Sulpiz Kurz =

German botanist and garden director

- Born: 5 May 1834; Augsburg, Kingdom of Bavaria
- Died: 15 January 1878 (aged 43); Penang, Straits Settlements, British Empire
- Education: Ludwig-Maximilians-Universität München
- Scientific career
- Author abbrev. (botany): Kurz

Wilhelm Sulpiz Kurz (5 May 1834 – 15 January 1878) was a German botanist and garden director in Bogor, West Java and Kolkata. He worked in India, Indonesia, Burma, Malaysia and Singapore. The standard author abbreviation Kurz is used to indicate this person as the author when citing a botanical name.

== Life ==
Kurz was born in Augsburg, and became a pupil of Carl Friedrich Philipp von Martius. He studied botany, mineralogy and chemistry at the Ludwig-Maximilians-Universität München. Family misfortunes in 1854 led him to abandon studies and move to Holland where he worked as an apothecary. He then joined the Dutch Colonial Army medical service and sailed to Java in September 1856. He moved to Banka in March 1857, and in 1859, he joined an expedition to Bori, Sulawesi (Celebes). In September of the same year, he joined the Botanic Garden at Buitenzoorg where he had access to a large library and worked with botanists. In 1864, he was induced by Thomas Anderson, who was visiting the Dutch colonies to examine cinchona cultivation, to return with him to Calcutta as curator of the herbarium, a post he held till his death.

In 1866, Kurz was sent to study the flora of the Andaman Islands. While in the South Andamans, he was attacked and tied up in the forest by convicts, leading to the abandonment of the project and his return to Calcutta. In 1867 he was asked to write botany texts for forest officers in British Burma which led him to travel and collect in the region. In November 1877, he left Calcutta for Penang but fell ill on reaching in December and died on 15 January 1878.

== Works ==
Kurz's major work is his Forest Flora of British Burma, Calcutta, 1877, 2 vols. He also wrote articles in the Journal of the Asiatic Society of Bengal and the Journal of Botany.
