= Trung Hà (disambiguation) =

Trung Hà may refer to several places in Vietnam, including:

- Trung Hà, a commune of Tuyên Quang province
- Trung Hà, Haiphong, a former commune of Thủy Nguyên district
- Trung Hà, Tuyên Quang, a former commune of Chiêm Hóa district
- Trung Hà, Vĩnh Phúc, a former commune of Yên Lạc district

== See also ==
- Trung Hà Bridge
