= Lâm Bình =

- Commune
- Interactive map of Lâm Bình
- Coordinates: 22°27′10″N 105°13′18″E
- Country: Vietnam
- Region: Northeast
- Province: Tuyên Quang
- Established: 16 June 2025
- Administrative headquarters: Lăng Can Hamlet

Area
  - Total: 327.65 km^{2} (126.51 sq mi)

Population (2025)
  - Total: 12,399
  - Density: 37/km^{2} (96/sq mi)

Lâm Bình is a commune in Tuyên Quang province, Vietnam. The commune inherited its name from the former Lâm Bình district. It is also the largest commune by area in the province.

== History ==
On 16 June 2025, the National Assembly of Vietnam adopted Resolution No. 203/2025/QH15 amending and supplementing several articles of the Constitution of the Socialist Republic of Vietnam. Under the resolution, district-level administrative units nationwide ceased to operate from 1 July 2025.

On the same date, the Standing Committee of the National Assembly of Vietnam issued Resolution No. 1684/NQ-UBTVQH15 on the arrangement of commune-level administrative units in Tuyên Quang province in 2025. Under the resolution, the entire area and population of Lăng Can Township, Phúc Yên Commune, and Xuân Lập Commune were merged to form a new commune named Lâm Bình.
