= Na Hang Dam =

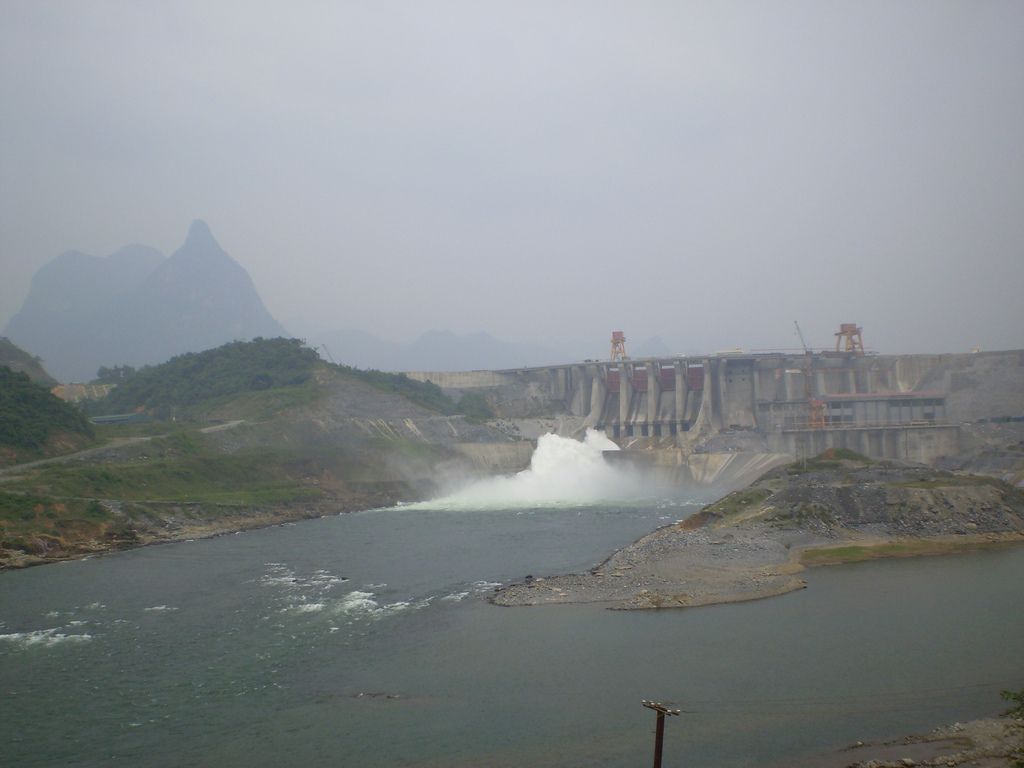
- Na Hang Dam

- Location within Vietnam
- Official name: Đập Na Hang
- Country: Vietnam
- Location: Tuyên Quang Province
- Coordinates: 22°21′36″N 105°23′55″E
- Status: Operational
- Construction began: 2002
- Opening date: 2008

Dam and spillways
- Type of dam: Rock-fill
- Impounds: Gâm River
- Height: 92 m (302 ft)
- Length: 718 m (2,356 ft)

Reservoir
- Total capacity: 2.3 cubic kilometres (1,900,000 acre⋅ft)

Power Station
- Turbines: 3 X 114 MW Francis-type
- Installed capacity: 342 MW
- Annual generation: 1,200 GWh

The Na Hang Dam (also known as Tuyên Quang Dam) is a hydroelectric dam on the Gâm River near Pác Tạ Mountain in Tuyên Quang Province, Vietnam.

Construction began on December 22, 2002, and the first unit was commissioned in March 2008 followed by the two other units by end of 2008. The power plant has a capacity of 342 MW (the second largest in the north), and has an energy generating potential of 1,200 GWh per year. The project's estimated approved cost was US$490 million. The project, as built, has a 92 metres (302 ft) rock fill dam and 718 metres (2,356 ft) long (crest length), called the Na Hang Dam. It has a gross storage capacity of 2.3 billion cubic metres (1,900,000 acre⋅ft) (including 1 billion cubic metres (810,000 acre⋅ft) of flood storage) on the Gâm River.

Construction of the dam inundated five communes involving about 4,000 households from an area of almost 8,000 hectares. Tay and Dao indigenous peoples were the majority in the Na Hang district when the dam was constructed. There are human rights concerns about missing compensation for relocation, with claims that infrastructure to support resettlement sites as agreed has been neglected by provincial authorities.

The local government has tried to take advantage of the Na Hang District hydroelectric project for tourism.
