= Lê Mạnh Hà =

Vietnamese human rights activist (born 1970)

Lê Mạnh Hà (born 21 February 1970) is a Vietnamese citizen journalist and human rights activist who gained prominence as a land rights petitioner in the early 2000s. He is currently serving an eight-year prison sentence for criticising the Vietnamese government.

== Personal life ==
Hà lived in Na Hang district, Tuyên Quang province, before being relocated by local authorities due to the construction of the Tuyên Quang Hydropower Project. Following this, he was relocated to Tuyên Quang, the provincial capital. He is married to Ma Thị Thơ.

== Activism ==
Hà campaigned against the relocation of farmers who were displaced by a major hydroelectric project in Tuyên Quang province. Hà himself had been relocated as a result of the project, and criticised the Vietnamese government for not upholding its promise to provide a certain amount of land to relocated people in Tuyên Quang. Hà studied law by himself to try to better support land petitioners.

In May 2018, Hà founded a YouTube channel, Tiếng Dân TV Lê Hà (lit. 'Voice of the People – Lê Hà Television') which posted videos of land petitioners and farmers speaking out against forced land acquisition by Vietnamese authorities. He interviewed many land petitioners from across Tuyên Quang province and professed his goal to "promote the Constitution in order to guarantee the rights for citizens". Hà said that the people only had their mobile phones to fight corruption.

Hà also voiced solidarity for prisoners of conscience, including Lê Trọng Hùng, Lê Văn Dũng and Phạm Đoan Trang.

== Arrest and trial ==
On 12 January 2022, Hà was arrested by provincial police in Tuyên Quang and charged with "making, storing, disseminating or propagandising information, materials and products that aim to oppose the State of the Socialist Republic of Vietnam" under article 117 of Vietnam's penal code, while on a trip to invite people to his daughter's engagement party in Chiêm Hóa district. A state-run provincial newspaper, Tuyên Quang claimed that Hà had "prepared, posted and shared on social media... many articles and video clips with content that propagandise, distort and defame the people's administration, insult great leader Ho Chi Minh and leaders of the Party and the State; and spread fabricated information to sow confusion among the people".

Hà's trial was originally scheduled for 19 September 2022, before being rescheduled for the 26 September. It was then rescheduled a second time due to the prosecutor being "too busy".

Hà's trial began in October 2022 in Tuyên Quang and lasted two days. Tuyên Quang reported that Hà had claimed his writing was based on what he had seen on social media which he felt exposed corruption, power and status buying, territorial sovereignty issues, the exploitation of natural resources and minerals, inadequate compensation for victims of land confiscation, a lack of confidence in members of the National Assembly, and failures in the healthcare and education systems. On 25 October, the court found that Hà's sharing of such views was "anti-state propaganda" and "very dangerous for society, violated national security, and contravened the policies of the Party" and sentenced him to eight years in prison, to be followed by five years on probation. Hà's four lawyers subsequently told reporters that the prosecution had failed to show that Hà had violated article 117 of the penal code.

== Recognition ==
The Committee to Protect Journalists issued a statement following Hà's conviction, stating he had been "wrongly convicted and harshly sentenced... for merely doing his job as a journalist" and called on the Vietnamese government to stop equating independent journalism with criminal behaviour and to immediately release Hà and other jailed journalists.
