= Na Hang district =

Coordinates: 22.417°N 105.333°E

Na Hang district Huyện Na Hang Huyện Nà Hang
- Rural District
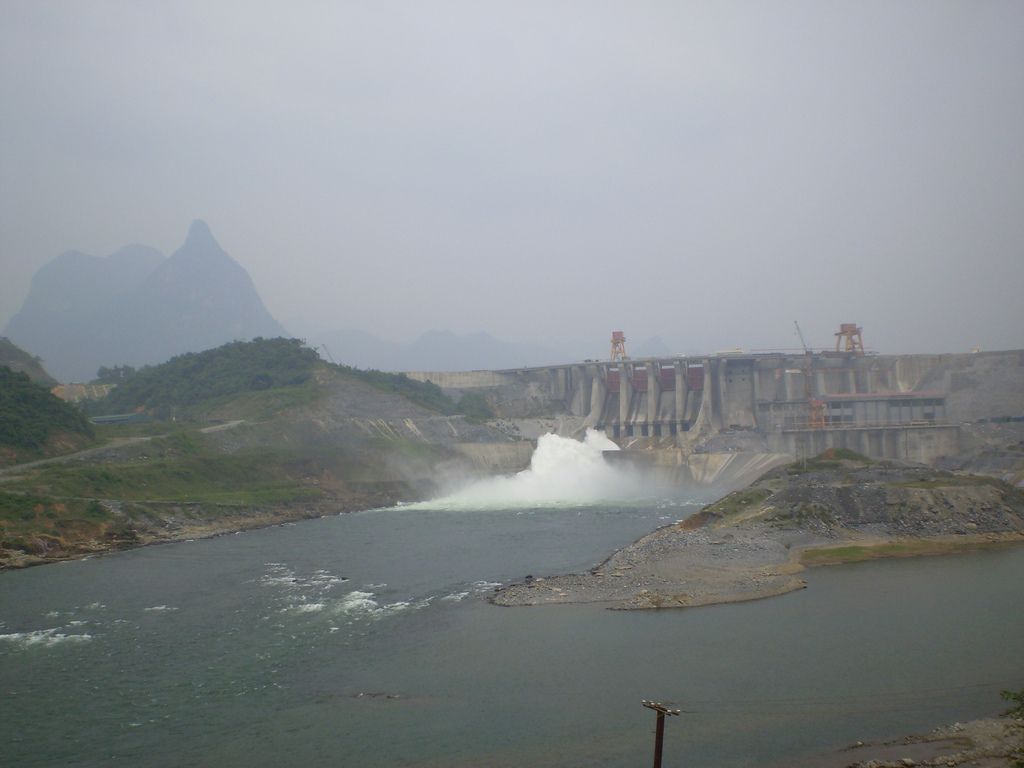
- View of Mỏm Núm and Tuyên Quang Dam.
- Nickname: "Land of Scents and Colors" (Miền hương sắc)
- Motto: "Steady for the future" (Vững bước tương lai)
- Interactive map of Na Hang district
- Country: Vietnam
- Region: Northeast
- Province: Tuyên Quang
- Existence: Ninth century to August 30, 2025
- Central hall: 993Q+GGJ, Na Hang township

Government
  - Type: Rural district
  - People Committee's Chairman: Tô Viết Hiệp
  - People Council's chairman: Hoàng Quang Tuyên
  - Front Committee's chairman: Ma Thế Hải
  - Party Committee's Secretary: Nguyễn Văn Thắng

Area
  - Total: 86.354 km^{2} (33.341 sq mi)

Population (2024)
  - Total: 47,619
  - Density: 551.44/km^{2} (1,428.2/sq mi)
- Time zone: UTC+7 (Indochina Time)
- ZIP code: 305140 (Note: An official code from 2022 to 2025.)
- Website: Nahang.Tuyenquang.gov.vn; Nahang.Tuyenquang.dcs.vn

Na Hang [na̤ː˨˩:haːŋ˧˧] is a former rural district of Tuyên Quang province in the Northeastern region of Vietnam.

== History ==
Its name may have been handed down for thousands of years, when Tai ethnic groups started migrating from Yunnan to the South region. Nà Hang (นา ร่อง) means "last fields" (or understand as "lowerland") in Tày language, which indicated the terrain of the land.

According to the explanation of the folk, the fields in the lowlands are always the meeting place of many water streams, so that place is considered as a beautiful terrain.

=== Middle Ages ===
According to books An Nam chí lược, An Nam chí nguyên, Đại Việt sử ký toàn thư and Đại Nam nhất thống chí, Nà Hang barracks (Note: "Trại" (barracks or farm) was an administrative unit, what equivalent to the commune-level around the time of the Lý–Trần dynasties.) (Nà Hang trại) was originally the Southern part of Vị Long canton (Vị Long châu), which corresponded to some rural districts of modern Yunnan, Guangxi and some Northwestern provinces of Vietnam. Before the 15th century, this territory was almost not under the control of any country in reality, but it was ruled by many chiefs (p'tao, phìa tạo), who had received some favors from Annamese and Chinese emperors. They have proved cleverly taking advantage of both of these forces to be able to survive stable, by Prince Trần Nhật Duật's appreciation.

When the Ming Dynasty was temporarily successful in controlling An Nam as a province in 1407, Nà Hang really became an official administrative unit called Đại Man rural district (Đại Man huyện). Đại Man belonged to Tuyên Hóa prefecture (Tuyên Hóa phủ), by Ming Veritable Records. However, right after the Later Lê Dynasty captured most of the Giao Chỉ area in 1428, Đại Man belonged to Yên Bình prefecture (Yên Bình phủ) of Tuyên Quang garrison (Tuyên Quang trấn). Therefore, the range of Nà Hang was established basically in the 15th century.

At the beginning of the 16th century, when the political situation in the central area of An Nam had many fluctuations, Đại Man once again became a fighting place between the two forces Lê-Trịnh and Mạc. Since 1592, Đại Man canton (Đại Man châu) has been the South part of Đàng Trên. (Note: "Đàng Tliên" in the record of Jesuit missionary Gaspar d'Amaral in Tong-Quin on December 31, 1632 : "... đàng tlaõ, đàng ngoày, đàng tliên : à 1°, commeçando do Sul, chamão, đàng tlão, que quer dizer, camiho de dentro; à 2° đàng ngoày, q quer dizer, caminho de fora; à 3°, đàng tliên, que quer dizer, camoinho de cima".) This situation has almost unchanged until the end of the 18th century.

In the 16th of Minh Mệnh (1835), Đại Man has been changed to Chiêm Hóa canton (Chiêm Hóa châu), by Đại Nam thực lục. Initially, it belonged to Yên Ninh prefecture (Yên Ninh phủ); then, Yên Ninh changed to Tương Yên.

After the French Army won the chiefs in Northern Annam in the late 1880s, Chiêm Hóa canton was part of the Hà Giang Little Military Zone (tiểu quân khu Hà Giang) from 1891 to 1895. Then, it was transferred again to the Tuyên Quang Little Military Zone (tiểu quân khu Tuyên Quang) from 1895 to 1900, belonged to the 3rd Corps (đạo quan binh số 3).

=== XX century ===
On April 11, 1900, Tuyên Quang province was re-established. Chiêm Hóa canton was officially the Northern part of the province.

On November 15, 1944, the Residence-Superior of Tonkin issued Decree 4375/I to separate Chiêm Hóa as two new cantons, named Chiêm Hóa and Nà Hang. (Note: Hồ-sơ lưu-trữ số 69102, phông Phủ Thống-sứ Bắc-Kỳ (RST) – Trung-tâm Lưu-trữ Quốc-gia I, Cục Lưu-trữ Nhà-nước Việt-Nam.) Bang Tá Fortress (as the canton capital) was abolished to be replaced with Nà Hang township (thị trấn Nà Hang).

When the Government of the Democratic Republic of Vietnam was established in January 1946, the regime of "châu" (canton) and "phủ" (prefecture) was abolished to be replaced by "huyện" (rural district) and "tỉnh" (province). Nà Hang rural district (huyện Nà Hang) had 21 commune-level administrative units at that time.

During the Indochina War, Nà Hang once again became the fighting area of France and Việt Minh forces. Although the Government of the State of Vietnam called it as Nà Hang district (quận Nà Hang), belonged to Tuyên Quang province of the Northern Vietnam (Bắc phần Việt Nam), however, it was under control of the Việt Bắc War Zone (chiến khu Việt Bắc) of Việt Minh in fact.

On December 27, 1975, Tuyên Quang was merged to Hà Giang to become Hà Tuyên province. Therefore, Nà Hang rural district belonged to Hà Tuyên. By August 12, 1991, after Tuyên Quang province was re-established, Nà Hang rural district belonged to Tuyên Quang.

=== XXI century ===
On January 25, 2006, the government of Vietnam issued Decree 14/2006/NĐ-CP (Note: Nghị định số 14/2006/NĐ-CP ngày 25/01/2006 của Chính Phủ về việc điều chỉnh địa giới hành chính một số xã, thị trấn thuộc huyện Na Hang, tỉnh Tuyên Quang.) to re-arrange the boundaries of communes in Tuyên Quang province. Accordingly, Nà Hang has been renamed Na Hang rural district (huyện Na Hang) to make it easier to pronounce to the masses.

On January 28, 2011, the government of Vietnam issued Resolution 07/NQ-CP (Note: Nghị quyết số 07/NQ-CP ngày 28/01/2011 của Chính Phủ về việc điều chỉnh địa giới hành chính huyện Na Hang và huyện Chiêm Hóa để thành lập huyện Lâm Bình thuộc tỉnh Tuyên Quang.) to adjust the Western boundaries of two rural districts Chiêm Hóa and Na Hang to establish new district Lâm Bình, where used to be Lâm Bình Forestry.

== Geography ==
=== Topography ===
Currently, Na Hang rural district has all 12 commune-level administrative units.

- 1 municipality : Na Hang capital-township.
- 11 communes : Côn Lôn, Đà Vị, Hồng Thái, Khâu Tinh, Năng Khả, Sinh Long, Sơn Phú, Thanh Tương, Thượng Giáp, Thượng Nông, Yên Hoa.

From local literary anecdotes, the rural district's terrain seems to be shaped a buffalo soaking in Gâm River, (Note: Vietnam Administrative Atlas, Nhà xuất bản Địa Đồ, Hà Nội, 2004.) moreover, the buffalo is also a local mascot for a long time. Na Hang has a completely plateau terrain, which is considered the most dangerous of Tuyên Quang province. Therefore, the largest resource of the rural district is forest and limestone mountains, which has almost been banned from exploiting since the 2000s to become an ecological conservation area.

The district is the origin of two rivers with extremely large water : Gâm and Năng. It is also the basis for forming Tuyên Quang Hydroelectricity in the area of Mỏm Núm (means "the Breast mountain"). Besides, this peak still contains a relatively large number of mineral, but due to security factors, they have not been exploited since the 1990s.

=== Demography ===
According to the statistics of the District People's Committee in 2024, Na Hang has a population of 47,619.

Ethnic composition in Na Hang rural district is relatively difficult to determine by the complex history of the land. But up to now at least 12 groups have been registered. In particular, Tày as 52.56%, Yao as 27.64%, Kinh as 9.44%. Besides, other groups have very low quantities and even are scattered.

Before the 1978 frontier conflict, the Hoa was a large community in the territory. However, due to the intense impact of stressful political situation, some have chosen solutions to return to Guangxi, Guangdong or refugeed in Hong Kong with the implicit agreement of local authorities of Tuyên Quang. The remaining people have accepted to register as part of other ethnic groups (Kinh, Tày, Nùng, Yao...) to have the opportunity to continue studying and working. So far, the Hoa in Na Hang consists of only a few small clans settling in the North of the rural district, where the terrain is relatively dangerous.

== Culture ==
=== Arts ===
Due to the specificity that the locality has the process of forming and developing customs for a very long time, so early, Na Hang has become an object of exploitation of literature and then cinema. Some works have used it as the context :

- Scattered Story from the Southern Part of the Plateau (嶺南逸史) by Chinese author Huang Yan (花溪逸士 黃岩, 1751–1830).
- The Sacred Mountain Peak (Đỉnh non-thần) by Vietnamese author Lan Khai in Hanoi 1941, what was adapted into wuxia film Love on the Abyss (Tình yêu bên bờ vực thẳm) in 1992.
- The Deer Horn (Chiếc sừng nai) and Nà Hang Fairy Tales (Truyện cổ Nà Hang) by writer Phù Ninh.
- Collection of Tuyên Quang Folk Tales (Tuyển tập truyện cổ Tuyên Quang) by researcher Bùi Thị Mai Anh.
- When the Birds Return, Season 3 (Khi đàn chim trở về, phần 3) : Vietnam Television's TV series in 2014.
- Legend of the Heavenly Land (Huyền thoại Mường Trời) : Vietnam Television's TV series in 2015.
- Underground Line at the Frontier (Mạch ngầm vùng biên ải) : Vietnam Television's TV series in 2015.
- Borderless Battle (Cuộc chiến không giới tuyến) : Vietnam Television's TV series in 2023.

=== Cuisine ===
Na Hang is known as the sticky rice (nếp nương) supplier and products originating from forest in large quantities of the entire mountainous region of the Northern Vietnam.

- Buffalo nem (nem trâu) : Buffalo meat after being made of rice flour and cornstarch is wrapped by forest leaves to be able to preserve long-term with the typical aroma of natural essential oils.
- "Lion meat" (thịt sư tử) : The dish comes from the years of famine in the 1980s. It has ingredients from all meats that someone can find. The mixture is heated with a pan and some spices from the forest, then served with xôi.
- Na Hang salty lemon (chanh muối Na Hang) : The dish originated from the Hoa community has lived in the territory since the 18th century. The lemon after being dried, continue to be soaked with a mixture of salt, sugar and a little water to be able to preserve for a long time.
- Na Hang rolled cake (bánh cuốn Na Hang) : Rice cakes with pork or sometimes buffalo meat, then served with hot water by cowbone.
- Roasted duck pho (phở vịt quay) : Duck meat in Na Hang is grilled with some forest trees as dổi grains and mắc mật leaves, then served with pho.

Besides : Phoenix barb form Gâm River, corn wine, sour pork, buffalo meat, "rocket" sausage, colory xôi, forest xôi, Hồng Thái pear...

=== Tourism ===
- Na Hang Lake: It was originally an artificial water area at the foot of Núm Mountain, which has been planned into a nature reserve since the 2000s.
- Phja Muồn Cave: The relic complex is related to prehistoric people.
- Pắk Tạ Temple: Where was built by Kinh colonists in the early 19th century to worship Prince Trần Nhật Duật, who was said to convince the chiefs to support the Trần Dynasty about 1285. Local folk have imagined more a legend about Prince's native wife to attract the attention of tourists.

=== Notable persons ===
- Lê Mạnh Hà (born 1970): A journalist and human rights activist.
- Nguyễn Mạnh Hà (born 1987) : A male singer and Hán-Nôm researcher.
- Đồng Thị Thu Hà (born 1969) : A theatre and cinema actress.
- Hoàng Thanh Tùng or Vàng Xanh Theo (born 1987) : Businessman and social activist.

== See also ==
- Bắc Quang district
- Chiêm Hóa district
- Lâm Bình district
