= Trung Hà =

- Commune
- Interactive map of Trung Hà
- Coordinates: 22°17′23″N 105°3′42″E
- Country: Vietnam
- Province: Tuyên Quang
- Region: Northeast
- Established: 1985
- Seat: Thôn Tân Hà

Area
  - Total: 103.18 km^{2} (39.84 sq mi)

Population (2025)
  - Total: 8,303
  - Density: 80/km^{2} (210/sq mi)
- Website: trungha.tuyenquang.gov.vn

Trung Hà is a commune in Tuyên Quang province, Vietnam.

== History ==
The area of present-day Trung Hà commune was formerly part of Chiêm Hóa district, Tuyên Quang province.

On 19 November 1985, the Council of Ministers issued Decision No. 267/HĐBT. Under the decision, Trung Hà commune was divided into two communes, named Trung Hà and Hà Lang.

On 12 June 2025, the National Assembly of Vietnam adopted Resolution No. 202/2025/QH15 on the reorganization of provincial-level administrative units. Under the resolution, the entire area and population of Hà Giang province and Tuyên Quang province were reorganized into a new province named Tuyên Quang.

On 16 June 2025, the National Assembly of Vietnam adopted Resolution No. 203/2025/QH15 amending and supplementing several articles of the Constitution of the Socialist Republic of Vietnam. Under the resolution, district-level administrative units nationwide ceased to operate from 1 July 2025.
