= Lâm Bình district =

Coordinates: 22.417°N 105.309°E

Lâm Bình District Huyện Lâm Bình
- District
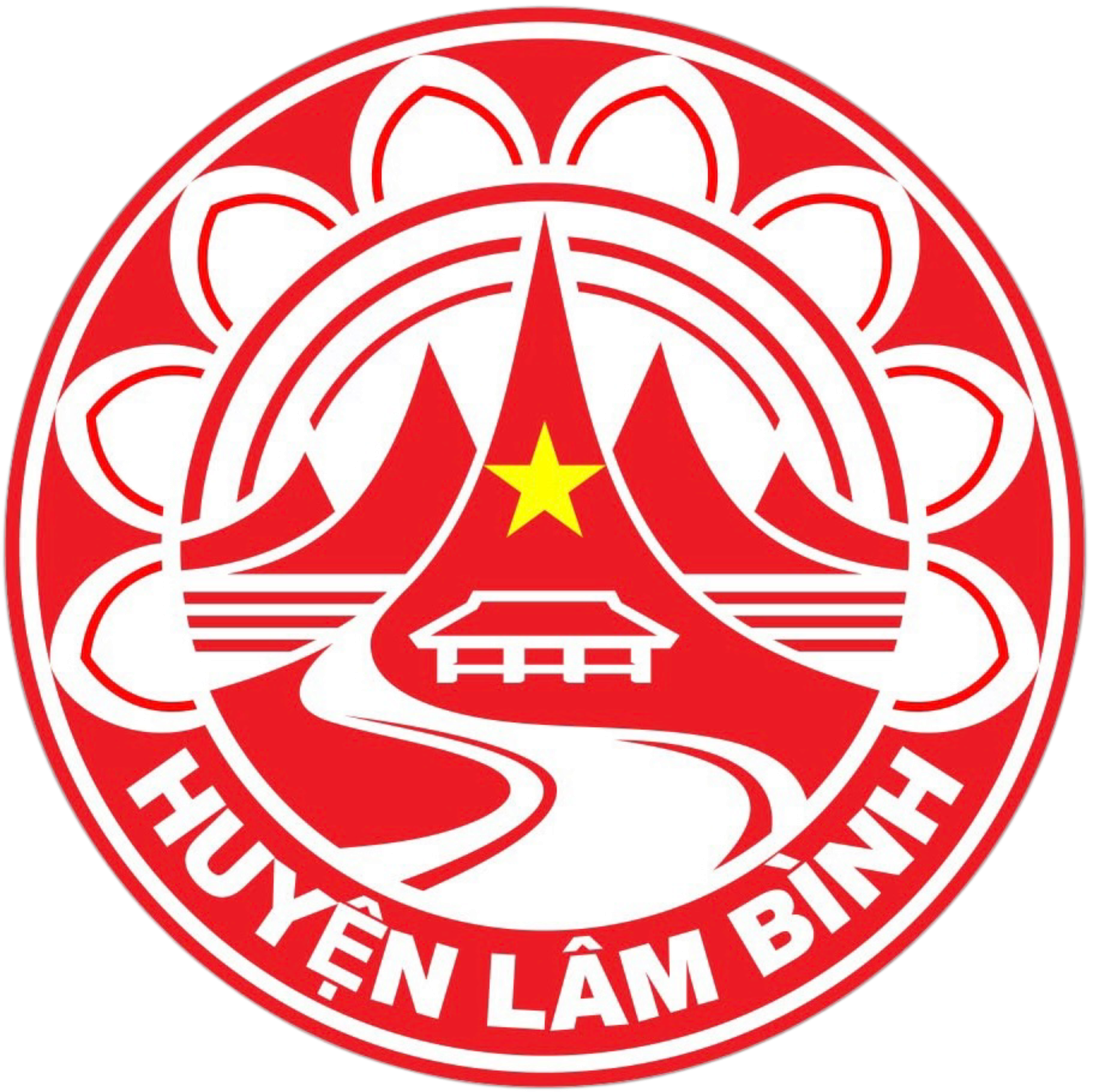
- Seal
- Interactive map of Lâm Bình District
- Country: Vietnam
- Region: Northeast
- Province: Tuyên Quang

Area
  - Total: 302 sq mi (782 km^{2})

Population (2011)
  - Total: 29,459
- Time zone: UTC+7 (UTC + 7)

Lâm Bình is a former rural district of Tuyên Quang province in the Northeast region of Vietnam. It is a new district in Vietnam, created in January 2011. Its area came from communes of Na Hang district and Chiêm Hoá district. As of 2011 the district had a population of 29,459. The district covers an area of 781.522 km^{2} (301.747 sq mi). The district capital is under construction.

== Communes ==
8 communes are:

- Lăng Can (considered as capital)
- Bình An
- Hồng Quang
- Khuôn Hà
- Phúc Yên
- Thổ Bình
- Thượng Lâm
- Xuân Lập
