= Gâm River =

River in Vietnam

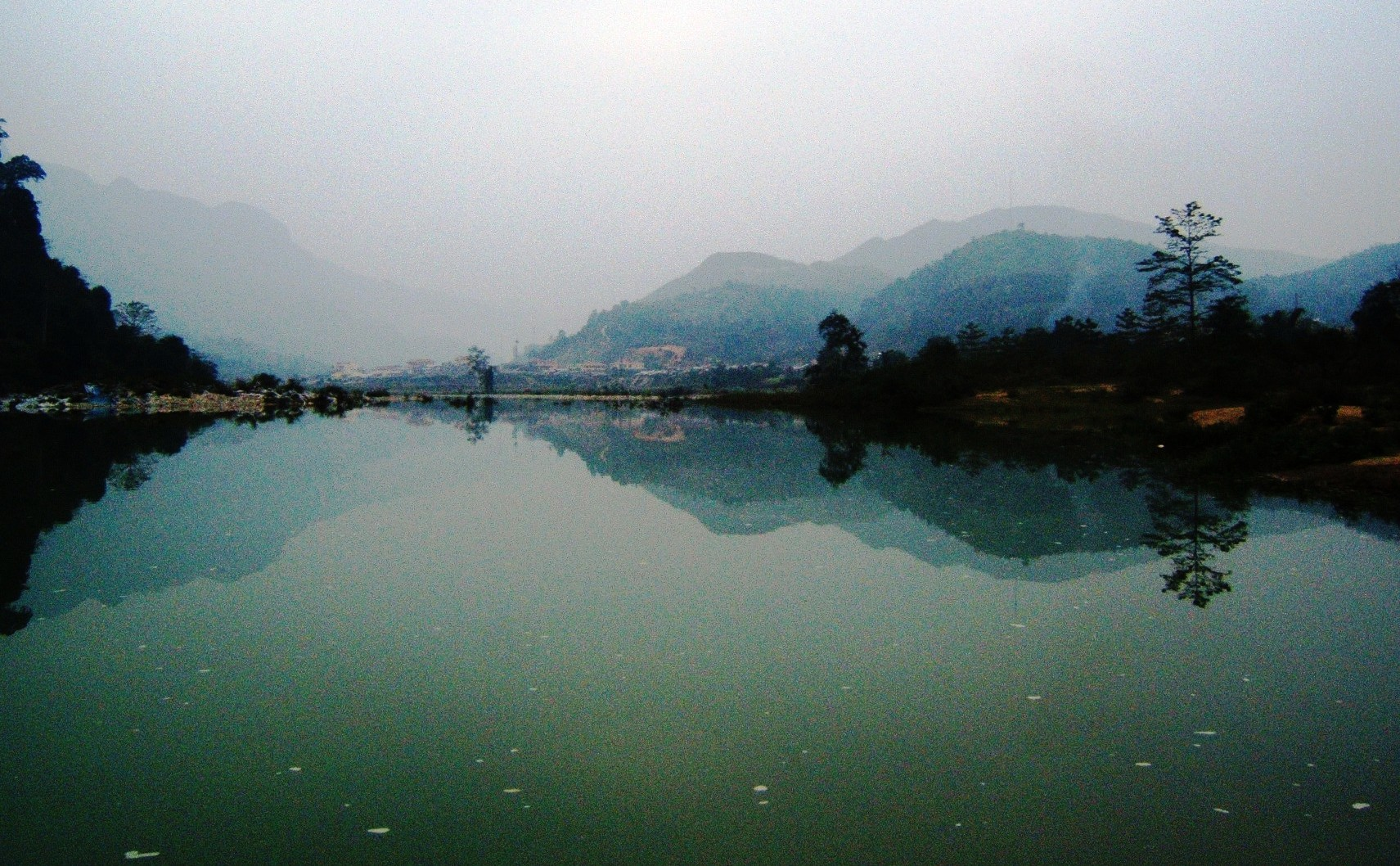

The Gâm River (Vietnamese: Sông Gâm, Chinese: 白南河, Bainan he) is a river which derived from the Guangxi, China.

The river enters Vietnamese territory at Cao Bằng Province, 23°0′42″N 105°47′12″E.

And then rivers in Hà Giang Province and Tuyên Quang Province, Vietnam.
