= Chiêm Hóa district =

Coordinates: 22.250°N 105.167°E

Chiêm Hóa district Huyện Chiêm Hóa
- District
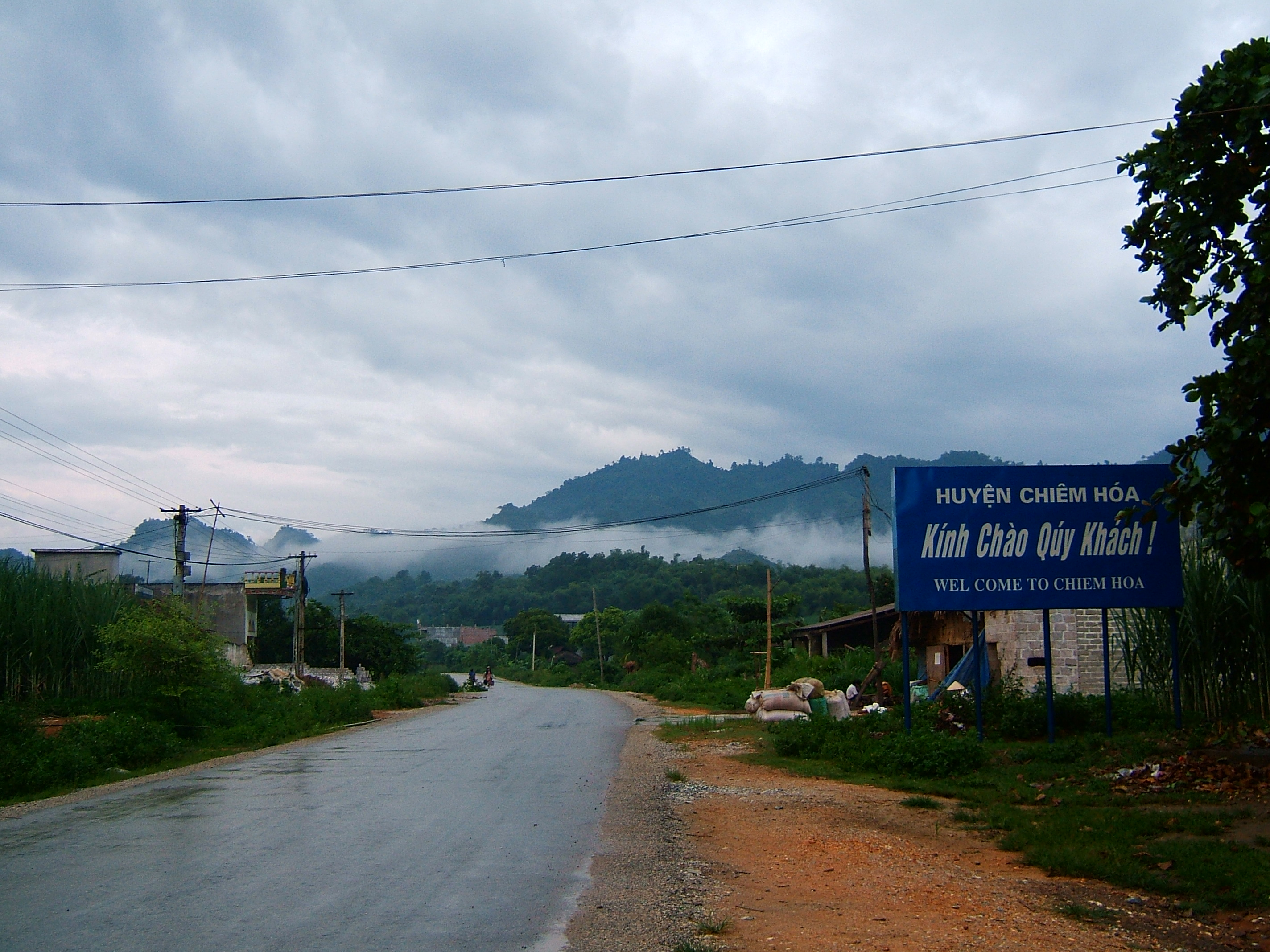
- Entrance to Chiêm Hóa district

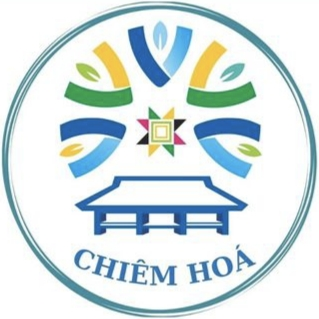
- Seal
- Interactive map of Chiêm Hóa district
- Country: Vietnam
- Region: Northeast
- Province: Tuyên Quang
- Capital: Vĩnh Lộc

Government

Area
  - Total: 442 sq mi (1,146 km^{2})

Population (2020)
  - Total: 134,091
  - Density: 300/sq mi (117/km^{2})
- Time zone: UTC+7 (UTC + 7)

Chiêm Hóa is a former rural district of Tuyên Quang province in the Northeast region of Vietnam. As of 2020 the district had a population of 134,091. The population density is 117 people/km^{2}. The district covers an area of 1.146,24 km^{2}. The district capital lies at Vĩnh Lộc, where the Gâm River flows in a north-south direction, 68 km north of Tuyen Quang city.

== Administrative divisions ==
Formerly, Chiêm Hóa district had 24 commune-level administrative units, including Vĩnh Lộc, the town (district capital) and 23 communes: Bình Nhân, Bình Phú, Hà Lang, Hòa An, Hòa Phú, Hưng Mỹ, Kiên Đài, Kim Bình, Linh Phú, Ngọc Hội, Nhân Lý, Phú Bình, Phúc Thịnh, Tân An, Tân Mỹ, Tân Thịnh, Tri Phú, Trung Hà, Trung Hoà, Vinh Quang, Xuân Quang, Yên Lập, Yên Nguyên.

=== Reorganization of Commune-Level Administrative Units in Tuyên Quang Province ===
Based on Proposal No. 367/ĐA-CP dated May 9, 2025, by the Government regarding the reorganization of commune-level administrative units in the (new) Tuyên Quang Province in 2025, the Standing Committee of the National Assembly has decided to reorganize and establish the commune-level administrative units of Tuyên Quang Province.

Pursuant to the above regulations, the 8 new communes of the former Chiêm Hóa District (belonging to Tuyên Quang Province) include:

No.	Former commune-level administrative units	New commune-level administrative unit
1	Vinh Loc town, Xuan Quang, Phuc Thinh, Ngoc Hoi, Trung Hoa communes	Chiem Hoa Commune
2	Tan Thinh, Nhan Ly, Hoa An communes	Hoa An Commune
3	Phu Binh, Kien Dai communes	Kien Dai Commune
4	Linh Phu, Tri Phu communes	Tri Phu Commune
5	Vinh Quang, Binh Nhan, Kim Binh communes	Kim Binh Commune
6	Hoa Phu, Yen Nguyen communes	Yen Nguyen Commune
7	Binh Phu, Yen Lap communes	Yen Lap Commune
8	Ha Lang, Tan An communes	Tan An Commune

The names of new units are standardized, usually derived from one of the former communes.

== Climate ==
Climate data for Chiêm Hóa
Month	Jan	Feb	Mar	Apr	May	Jun	Jul	Aug	Sep	Oct	Nov	Dec	Year
Record high °C (°F)	32.6 (90.7)	34.8 (94.6)	37.5 (99.5)	39.0 (102.2)	41.5 (106.7)	39.8 (103.6)	39.2 (102.6)	39.1 (102.4)	38.5 (101.3)	35.2 (95.4)	34.6 (94.3)	33.4 (92.1)	41.5 (106.7)
Mean daily maximum °C (°F)	20.0 (68.0)	21.4 (70.5)	24.4 (75.9)	28.7 (83.7)	32.3 (90.1)	33.3 (91.9)	33.3 (91.9)	33.1 (91.6)	32.3 (90.1)	29.6 (85.3)	26.1 (79.0)	22.4 (72.3)	28.1 (82.6)
Daily mean °C (°F)	15.7 (60.3)	17.3 (63.1)	20.3 (68.5)	24.1 (75.4)	27.0 (80.6)	28.2 (82.8)	28.2 (82.8)	27.8 (82.0)	26.7 (80.1)	24.1 (75.4)	20.4 (68.7)	16.9 (62.4)	23.1 (73.6)
Mean daily minimum °C (°F)	13.3 (55.9)	15.0 (59.0)	17.9 (64.2)	21.2 (70.2)	23.6 (74.5)	25.0 (77.0)	25.2 (77.4)	24.9 (76.8)	23.7 (74.7)	21.2 (70.2)	17.4 (63.3)	13.9 (57.0)	20.2 (68.4)
Record low °C (°F)	0.5 (32.9)	3.7 (38.7)	5.1 (41.2)	12.2 (54.0)	16.2 (61.2)	18.9 (66.0)	19.4 (66.9)	20.5 (68.9)	15.6 (60.1)	10.5 (50.9)	6.1 (43.0)	0.6 (33.1)	0.5 (32.9)
Average precipitation mm (inches)	29.8 (1.17)	30.4 (1.20)	54.1 (2.13)	122.0 (4.80)	232.4 (9.15)	280.8 (11.06)	293.0 (11.54)	290.7 (11.44)	160.7 (6.33)	99.1 (3.90)	49.5 (1.95)	25.2 (0.99)	1,667.6 (65.65)
Average rainy days	11.3	11.4	13.8	14.7	15.5	17.1	19.5	19.1	13.4	10.7	8.9	7.9	163.4
Average relative humidity (%)	85.5	85.1	84.6	83.9	82.2	84.4	85.6	86.7	85.6	85.3	85.2	84.4	84.9
Source: Vietnam Institute for Building Science and Technology
